= Department of Social and Decision Sciences (Carnegie Mellon University) =

Coordinates: 40.441332°N 79.944617°W

The Department of Social and Decision Sciences (SDS) is an interdisciplinary academic department within the Dietrich College of Humanities and Social Sciences at Carnegie Mellon University. The Department of Social and Decision Sciences is headquartered in Porter Hall in Pittsburgh, Pennsylvania and is led by Department Head Gretchen Chapman. SDS is known for research and education programs in decision-making in public policy, economics, management, and the behavioral social sciences.

== History ==
The Department of Social Sciences was established in 1976, as part of the Dietrich College of Humanities and Social Sciences under Dean John Patrick Crecine with approval from Heinz College Dean Otto Davis, which previously housed the program. The department was staffed by political scientists, sociologists, and economists from within the Dietrich College, the Heinz College, and the Tepper School of Business. In the 1980s, the department was led by Patrick D. Larkey and developed the undergraduate information systems program which became a huge success, eventually being spun off into an independent interdisciplinary program in the Dietrich College. In 1985, Robyn Dawes joined the department and began to re-focus it into its current form and expertise in behavioral decision-making and caused it to be renamed as the Department of Social and Decision Sciences. Carnegie Mellon's Institute for Technology and Security was spun off of the department in 2015 (as the Institute for Politics and Strategy).

== Education ==
The department runs undergraduate Bachelor of Science programs in Decision Science and Policy and Management and a Bachelor of Arts program in Behavioral Economics, Policy, and Organizations as well as minors in Decision Science and Policy and Management. Further, SDS is a partner in various interdisciplinary undergraduate programs such as the Sociology minor, Environmental Policy program, and the Quantitative Social Science Scholars program. At the master's degree level, SDS partners with several other colleges and departments for the Engineering and Technology Innovation Management program. The graduate PhD program allows doctoral students options in Social and Decision Sciences, Behavioral Decision Research (BDR) as well as a joint PhDs in Behavioral Decision Research and Psychology with the Department of Psychology, Behavioral Marketing and Decision Research and Behavioral Economics with the Tepper School of Business, and a joint MD-PhD Medical Scientist Training program with the University of Pittsburgh School of Medicine. SDS also hosts an executive education program in behavioral economics. Students are trained in policy analysis and research methods. SDS is also closely associated with its spin-off programs: the undergraduate Information Systems program and the Institute for Politics and Strategy.

== Research ==
The department's primary focus lies in interdisciplinary research, particularly in the intersection of politics and sociology with economics, psychology and human decision making. Statistics, microeconomics, rational decision theory and game theory are among the many areas of specialization. SDS faculty are very involved in interdisciplinary research throughout the university, and are drawn from fields as diverse as economics, psychology, sociology, history, management science, and political science. SDS is affiliated with several labs and centers:

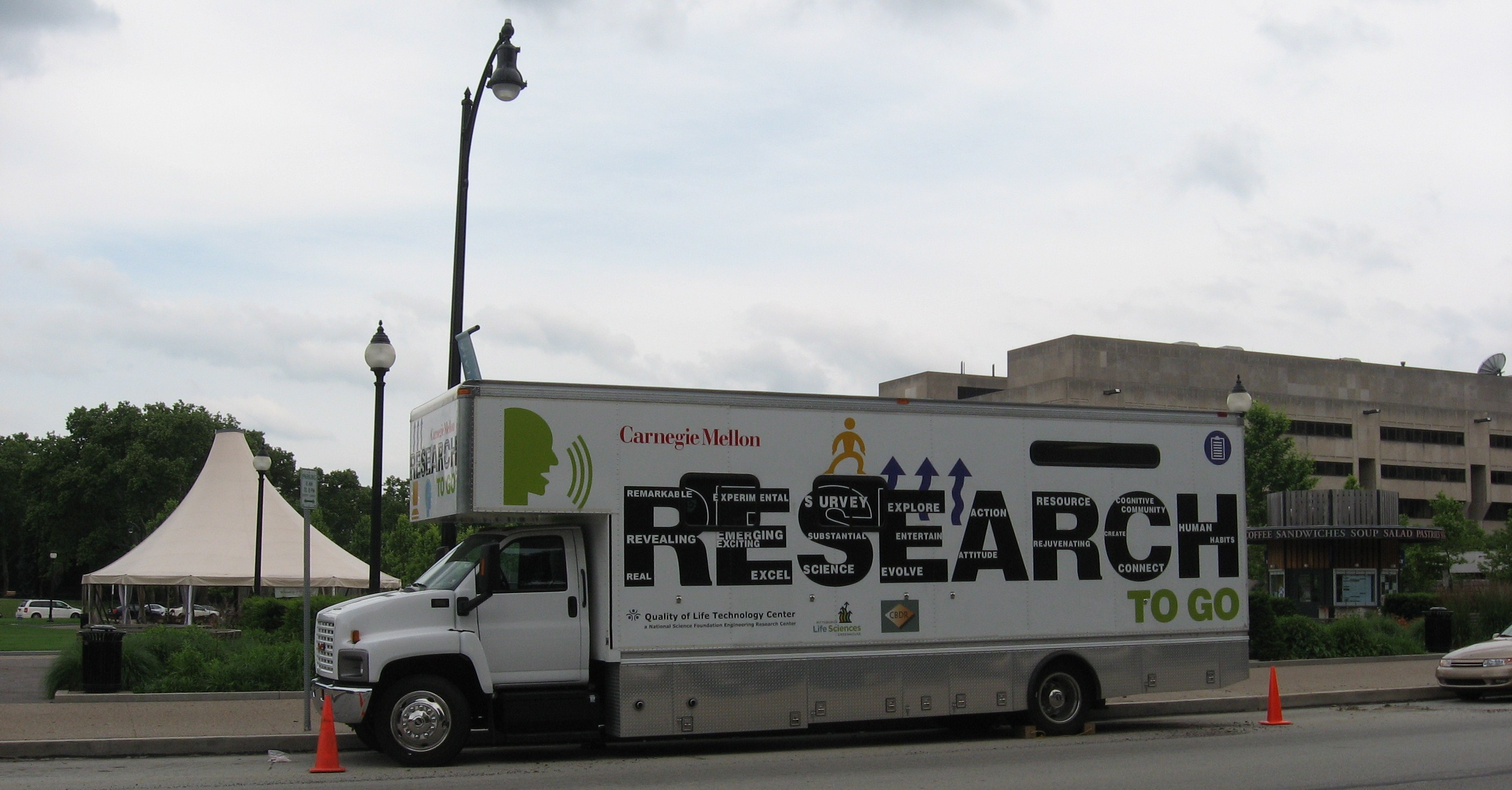
Data Truck serving researchers in the Department of Social and Decision Sciences

- Behavioral Economics and Decision Research Policy Lab
- Center for Behavioral and Decision Research
- Center for Risk Perception and Communication
- Data-Driven Diversity Lab
- Dynamic Decision Making Laboratory

As part of the Center for Behavioral Decision Research, SDS manages the Data Truck and managed the Carnegie Mellon Research Cafe. The Data Truck is a mobile behavioral science lab. The Research Cafe was a cafe located in downtown Pittsburgh and was designed to perform behavioral research outside of the student population on the main Carnegie Mellon Pittsburgh campus where the SDS labs are located. The cafe is now closed.

== Rankings ==
In 2006, an Institute for Operations Research and the Management Sciences study gave four of five stars to the graduate program in prescriptive decision making and five stars in descriptive decision making. These two ratings tied the department for first place among decision science programs in the United States with Duke University and the University of Pennsylvania.

== Faculty ==
SDS is home to faculty in the fields of decision science, decision support systems, behavioral economics, organizational behavior, risk analysis, management science, and complex social systems. Some notable faculty members (both current and past) include Baruch Fischhoff, Paul Fischbeck, Robyn Dawes, George Loewenstein, Cleotilde Gonzalez, Jennifer Lerner, Kathleen Carley, David Krackhardt, Steven Klepper, Linda C. Babcock, Lee Branstetter, David A. Hounshell, William Keech, John H. Miller, Mark Kamlet, Roberto Weber, Herbert A. Simon, Jendayi Frazer, Kiron Skinner, Sara Kiesler, John Patrick Crecine, Cristina Bicchieri, Joseph Born Kadane, Daniel M. Oppenheimer, Patrick D. Larkey, and Otto Davis. The current faculty consists of 20 full-time members with additional associated and adjunct faculty, staff, and fellows. In addition the department works closely with the departments of Engineering and Public Policy, Psychology, Tepper School of Business, Heinz College, Institute for Security and Technology, and the Information Systems program. Many SDS faculty have joint appointments in these departments.
