= Alfred Blumstein =

American scientist (1930–2026)

- Born: June 3, 1930; New York, U.S.
- Died: January 13, 2026 (aged 95); Canton, Massachusetts, U.S.
- Education: Cornell University
- Known for: Criminology
- Scientific career
- Fields: Operations research; Criminology; Urban systems
- Workplaces: Institute for Defense Analysis; Carnegie Mellon University

Alfred Blumstein (June 3, 1930 – January 13, 2026) was an American scientist and the J. Erik Jonsson University Professor of Urban Systems and Operations Research at the Heinz College and Department of Engineering and Public Policy at Carnegie Mellon University. He is known as one of the top researchers in criminology and operations research.

In 1998, Blumstein was elected a member of the National Academy of Engineering for bringing systems engineering and operations research to the field of criminology.

== Life and career ==
Blumstein graduated with his bachelor's degree and Ph.D. from Cornell University and worked at the Institute for Defense Analyses before joining the Heinz College.

He directed the NSF-funded National Consortium on Violence Research at Carnegie Mellon and was dean of the Heinz College from 1986 to 1993.

Blumstein was a fellow of the American Association for the Advancement of Science (AAAS) and the American Society of Criminology and served as President of the latter.

He was president of the Operations Research Society of America (ORSA) in 1977–1978, The Institute of Management Sciences (TIMS) in 1987–1988 and in 1996 he was the president of the Institute for Operations Research and the Management Sciences (INFORMS). He became an INFORMS Fellow in 2002.

Blumstein died in Canton, Massachusetts on January 13, 2026, at the age of 95.

== Publications ==
- 1968: National program of research, development, test, and evaluation on law enforcement and criminal justice.
- 1970: Systems analysis for social problems. Edited with Murray Kamrass and Armand B. Weiss.
- 1978: Assembly of Behavioral and Social Sciences (U.S.). Panel on Research on Deterrent and Incapacitative Effects. Deterrence and incapacitation: estimating the effects of criminal sanctions on crime rates. Edited with Jacqueline Cohen and Daniel Nagin.
- 1983: Research on sentencing: the search for reform. Edited with others.
- 1986: Criminal careers and "career criminals". Edited with others.
- 2000: Crime drop in America. Edited with Joel Wallman.
- 2007: Key issues in criminal career research: new analyses of the Cambridge Study in Delinquent Development. With Alex R. Piquero and David P. Farrington.
