= Robert Strauss =

Robert Strauss may refer to:

- Robert Strauss (actor) (1913–1975), American actor
- Robert S. Strauss (1918–2014), American attorney, politician and diplomat
- Robert P. Strauss, American economist
- Robert Strauß (born 1986), German footballer with FC Augsburg
- Robert Strauss (wrestler) (born 1983), American wrestler signed to WWE, better known as Robbie E
