= Kiron Skinner =

American political scientist (b. 1961)

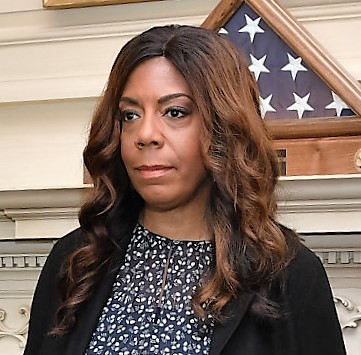
- Skinner in 2018

30th Director of Policy Planning
- In office September 4, 2018 – August 2, 2019
- President: Donald Trump
- Preceded by: Brian Hook
- Succeeded by: Peter Berkowitz

Personal details
- Born: 1961 (age 64–65) Chicago, Illinois, U.S.
- Party: Republican
- Education: Sacramento City College (AA); Spelman College (BA); Harvard University (MA, PhD)

Kiron Kanina Skinner (born 1961) is an American political scientist. She was Director of Policy Planning at the United States Department of State in the first Trump administration. Skinner is presently the Taube Professor of International Relations and Politics at the Pepperdine University School of Public Policy, where she teaches graduate courses in national security and public leadership. Prior to that, she was the Taube Professor of International Relations and Politics at Carnegie Mellon University, and the founding director of the Institute for Politics and Strategy and associated centers at the university. She is also the W. Glenn Campbell Research Fellow at the Hoover Institution of Stanford University. After leaving the Department of State, she returned to her position at Carnegie Mellon University until stepping down in 2021.

She co-authored two books on Ronald Reagan: In His Own Hand (2001) and Reagan, a Life in Letters (2003), which were New York Times bestsellers. In 2005, Skinner was appointed by President George W. Bush to a term on the National Security Education Board.

== Early life and education ==
Skinner was born in Chicago in 1961 and grew up in the San Francisco Bay Area. She earned an associate degree in communications from Sacramento City College in 1979. She won the Harry S. Truman Scholarship for the State of California, which enabled her to move on to Spelman College, where she earned a bachelor's degree in political science. She then earned an MA and PhD in political science and international relations from Harvard University. While at Harvard, she was a student of future United States Secretary of State Condoleezza Rice, who advised her, "People may oppose you, but when they realize you can hurt them, they'll join your side."

== Academic career ==
Skinner is the Taube Professor of International Relations and Politics at the Pepperdine University School of Public Policy, where she teaches graduate courses in national security and public leadership. She previously served at Carnegie Mellon University, where she was the founding director of the Institute for Politics and Strategy (IPS), part of the Dietrich College of Humanities and Social Sciences; university adviser on national security policy; Taube Professor of International Relations and Politics; and director of the International Relations and Politics undergraduate major. In addition, Skinner is a Distinguished Fellow at CyLab, a research center in the College of Engineering, and holds courtesy faculty positions at CMU's Heinz College, the Institute for Software Research, an academic department in the School of Computer Science, and in the Department of Social and Decision Sciences. She has also taught political science courses at Hamilton College, Harvard University, and the University of California, Los Angeles. At Stanford University's Hoover Institution, Skinner is the W. Glenn Campbell Research Fellow and a member of the Shultz-Stephenson Task Force on Energy Policy.

In 2020, Skinner appointed Richard Grenell to a position at Carnegie Mellon University. This appointment was condemned in letters signed by faculty, staff, and students. In February 2021, Skinner stepped down as director of Carnegie Mellon's Institute for Politics and Strategy, which she founded.

== Political career ==
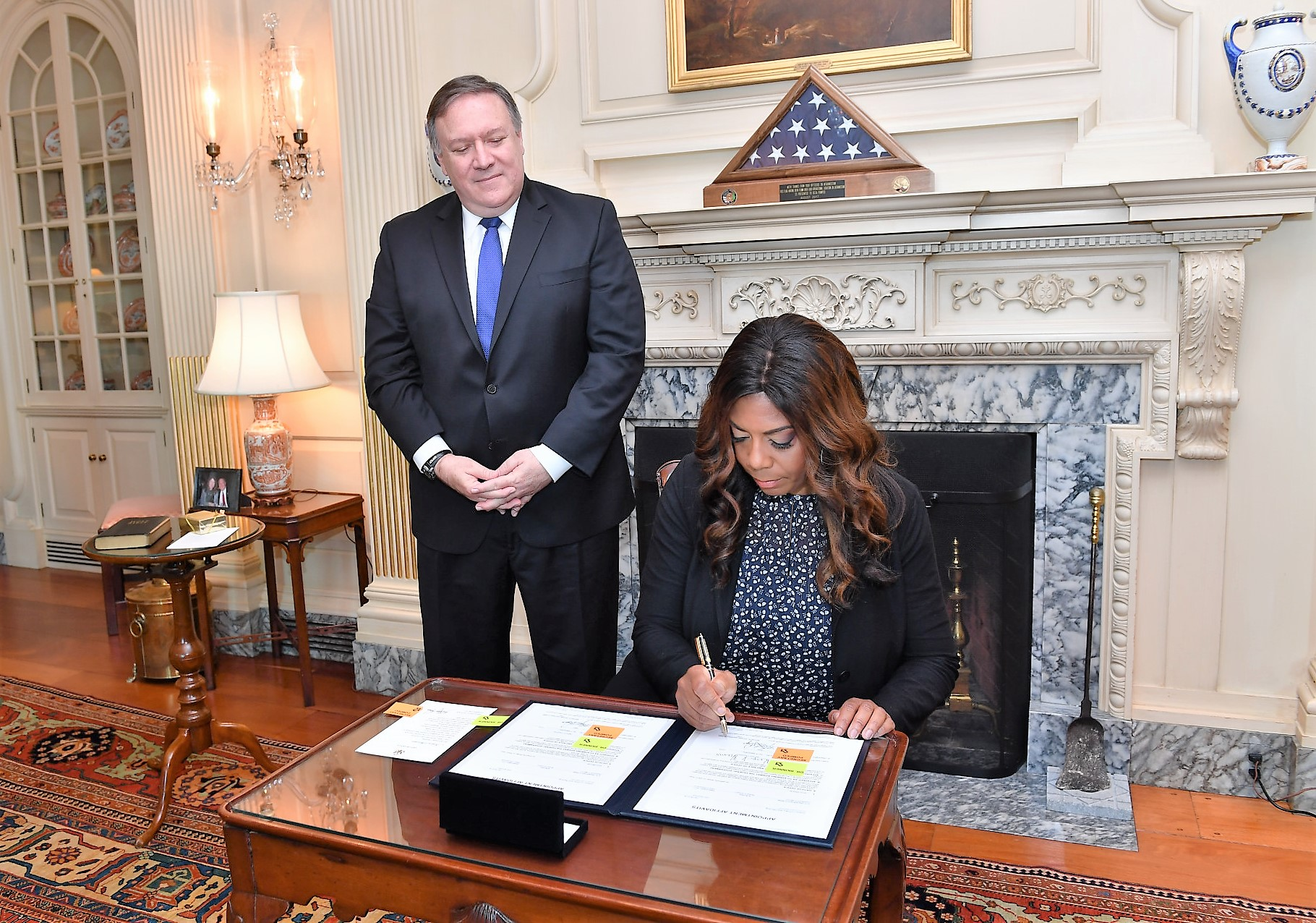
Secretary of State Mike Pompeo officiates the Swearing-In Ceremony for Dr. Kiron Skinner as Director of Policy Planning, September 2018.

=== George W. Bush administration ===
Skinner served as a foreign policy surrogate for the George W. Bush presidential re-election campaign in 2004.

=== Other jobs ===
In 2010, she was appointed to the advisory board of the George W. Bush Oral History Project. She was a senior foreign policy adviser to former Speaker of the House Newt Gingrich during his presidential primary campaign from 2011 to 2012 and then to Mitt Romney's presidential general election campaign in the fall of 2012. In 2012, Pennsylvania Governor Tom Corbett appointed Skinner to the Governor's Advisory Commission on African American Affairs.

=== Trump administration ===
In 2016, Skinner served on President-elect Donald Trump's transition team for national security. She had a position as a senior advisor for the State Department but left the role after a few days. In August 2018, Secretary of State Mike Pompeo announced her as the new Director of Policy Planning at the U.S. State Department, and she was sworn in on September 4, 2018. She was given a coordinating role on the newly formed Commission on Unalienable Rights, whose creation was announced July 8, 2019.

Skinner drew international attention in April 2019 for stating at a foreign policy forum that the U.S. competition with China would be especially bitter, because unlike the Cold War with the Soviet Union which is "a fight within the Western family", “it’s the first time that we will have a great-power competitor that is not Caucasian". Some critics viewed these remarks as a new version of Samuel P. Huntington's clash of civilizations thesis or as bordering on racism.

Skinner's term at the State Department ended in August 2019.

== Policy advising ==
In 2023, Skinner contributed to the State Department chapter in the ninth edition of Heritage Foundation's book Mandate for Leadership, which provides the policy agenda for Project 2025.

== Publications ==
- Reagan, In His Own Hand: The Writings of Ronald Reagan that Reveal His Revolutionary Vision for America with Annelise Anderson and Martin Anderson. Free Press, 2001. ISBN 0743219384
- Reagan: A Life In Letters with Annelise Anderson and Martin Anderson. Free Press, 2004. ISBN 0743219678
- Strategy of Campaigning: Lessons from Ronald Reagan and Boris Yeltsin with Serhiy Kudelia, Bruce Bueno de Mesquita, and Condoleezza Rice. University of Michigan Press, 2007.
- Turning Points in Ending the Cold War, Hoover Institution Press, 2008.
- "Department of State." In Paul Dans and Steven Groves (eds.), Mandate for Leadership: The Conservative Promise. The Heritage Foundation, 2023. ISBN 978-0-89195-174-2
