= Charles Moran =

Charles Moran may refer to:

- Charles Moran (baseball) (1879–1934), Major League Baseball player
- Charles Moran (Australian politician) (1868–1936), member of the Legislative Assembly of Western Australia
- Charles Moran (American politician) (1797–1876), American businessman, jurist, and politician
- Charles Moran (racing driver) (1906–1978), American racecar driver
- Charles Moran (railroad executive) (1811–1895), American businessman and president of the Erie Railroad
- Charley Moran (1878–1949), American sportsman, coach and umpire, in baseball and football
- Charles T. Moran (born 1980), American political operative

== See also ==
- Charles Wilson, 1st Baron Moran (1882–1977), British physician
