= Skandera =

Skandera is a surname. Notable people with the surname include:

- Hanna Skandera, American politician
- Laura Skandera Trombley (born 1960s), born Laura Skandera, American literary scholar
