= Torrens Building =

Historic property in Adelaide, South Australia

Coordinates: 34°55′42″S 138°36′03″E

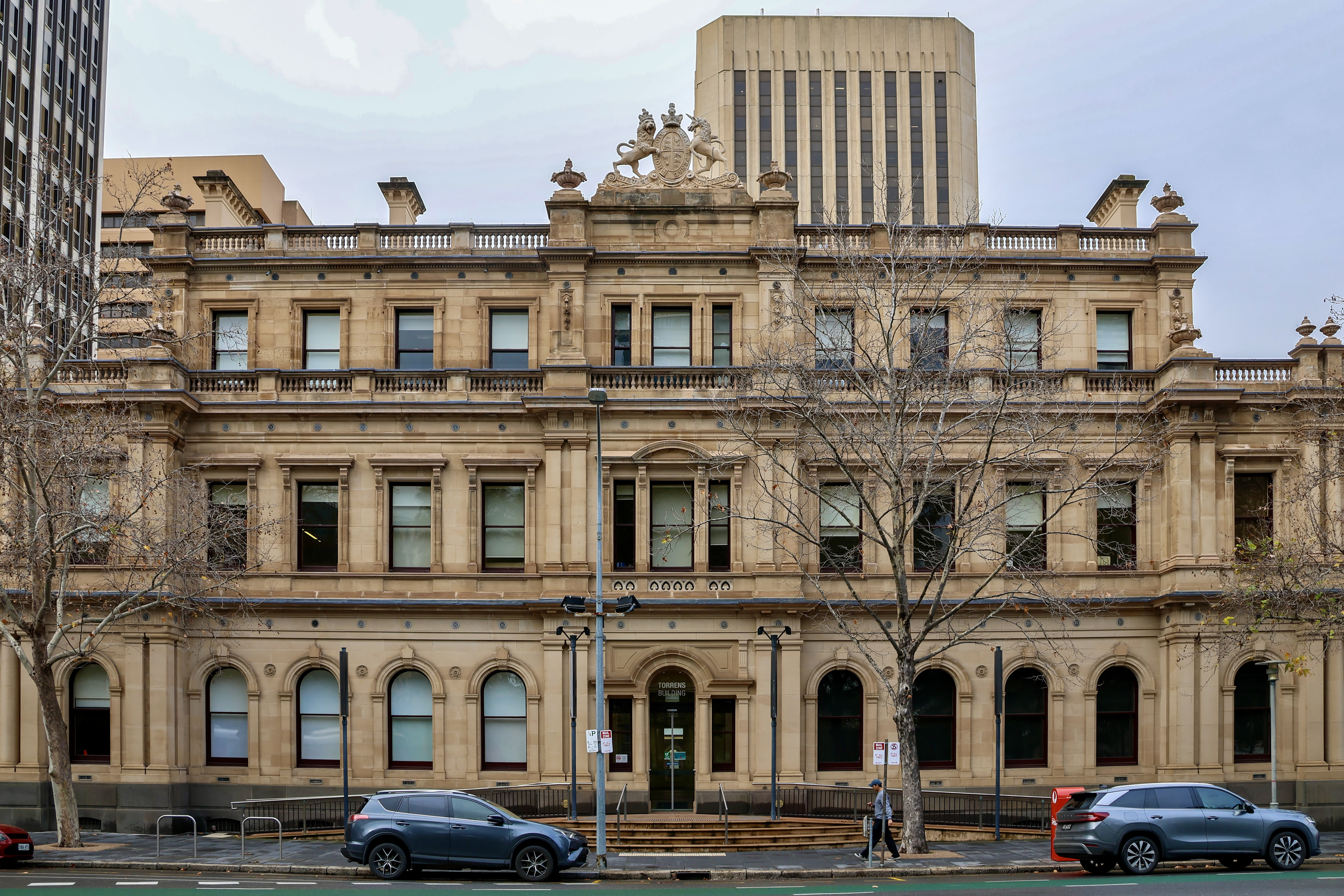
- Front view of the Torrens Building, 2026
- Former names: Government Offices

General information
- Type: Office
- Architectural style: Renaissance; Palladian
- Location: 220 Victoria Square, Adelaide, Australia
- Named for: Robert Richard Torrens
- Year built: 1879–1881
- Renovated: 1997
- Cost: approx. £60,000
- Owner: Government of South Australia

Technical details
- Floor area: 3,653 square metres (39,320 ft^{2})

Design and construction
- Architect: Michael Egan (Melbourne)
- Main contractor: James Shaw

South Australian Heritage Register
- Official name: Torrens Building
- Designated: 28 May 1981
- Reference no.: 10895

The Torrens Building, named after Sir Robert Richard Torrens, is a State Heritage-listed building on the corner of Victoria Square and Wakefield Street in Adelaide, South Australia. It was originally known as the New Government Offices, and after that a succession of names reflecting its tenants, including as New Public Offices, the Lands Titles Office, and Engineering & Water Supply Department. It has been home to a number of government departments for much of its existence, and it currently holds offices for the Commissioner for Public Sector Employment (OCPSE) as part of the Government of South Australia.

The construction of the building created some controversy in 1880 when it was reported that the Government of South Australia was going to import freestone for its construction from Sydney, rather than use stone from local quarries.

The building was heritage-listed in 1978 (Register of the National Estate) and 1981 (SA Heritage Register), and underwent a major renovation from 1993 until its reopening on 19 September 1997.

It has housed the Australian campus of the Carnegie Mellon University from 2006 to 2022 and Torrens University opened its first campus there in 2014. Cranfield University (UK) had a campus in the building from 2007 to 2010 and the University College London from 2009 to 2017.

== History ==
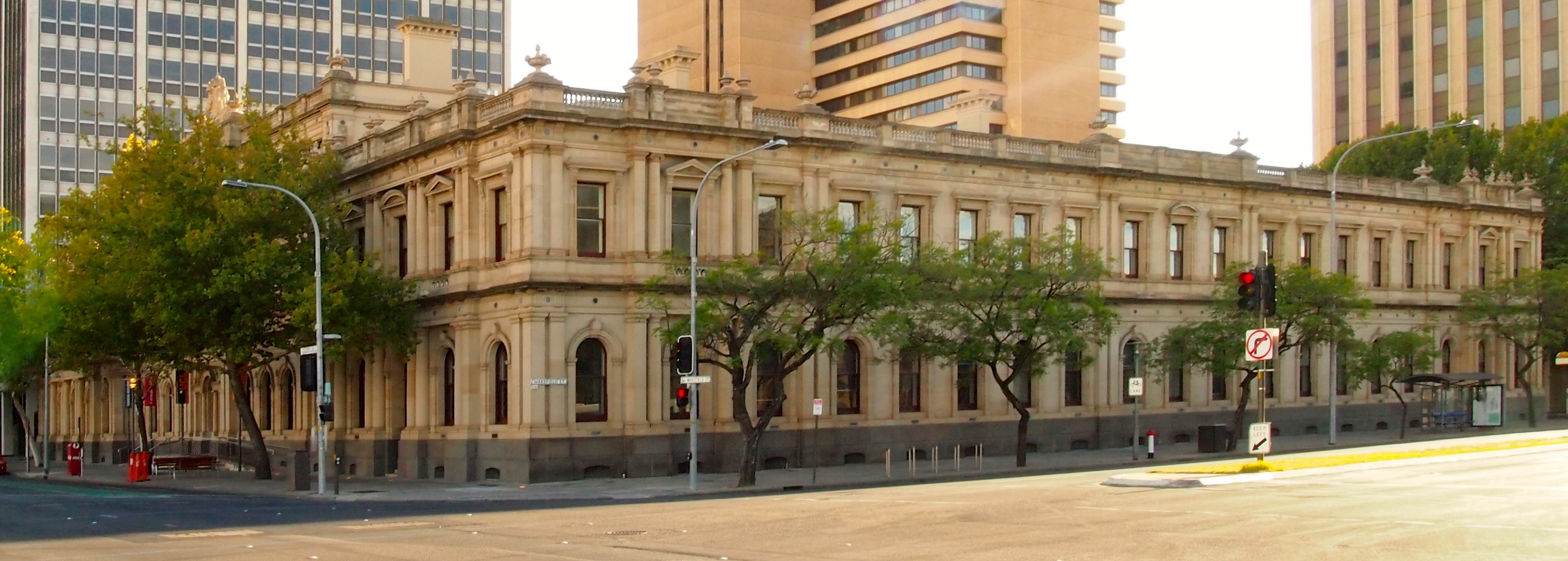
Torrens Building viewed from Victoria Square

The building at 220 Victoria Square/Tarndanyangga was built in 1881 as public service offices, and initially known as the New Government Offices. It created some controversy in 1880 when it was reported that the Government of South Australia was going to import freestone for construction from Sydney, rather than use stone from local quarries.

For a long time it went by a number of names, such as New Public Offices, the Lands Titles Office, and Engineering Supply Department, after its main occupants.

In 1979 it was renamed as the Torrens Building, after Sir Robert Richard Torrens and the system of lands title registration introduced by him to South Australia and the world, the Torrens title system.

In 1993, after 112 years of continuous governmental occupation, the Torrens Building was closed for restoration. Since its reopening in 1997, it has become host to a number of Australian campuses of prestigious foreign universities.

=== Restoration and Renovation ===
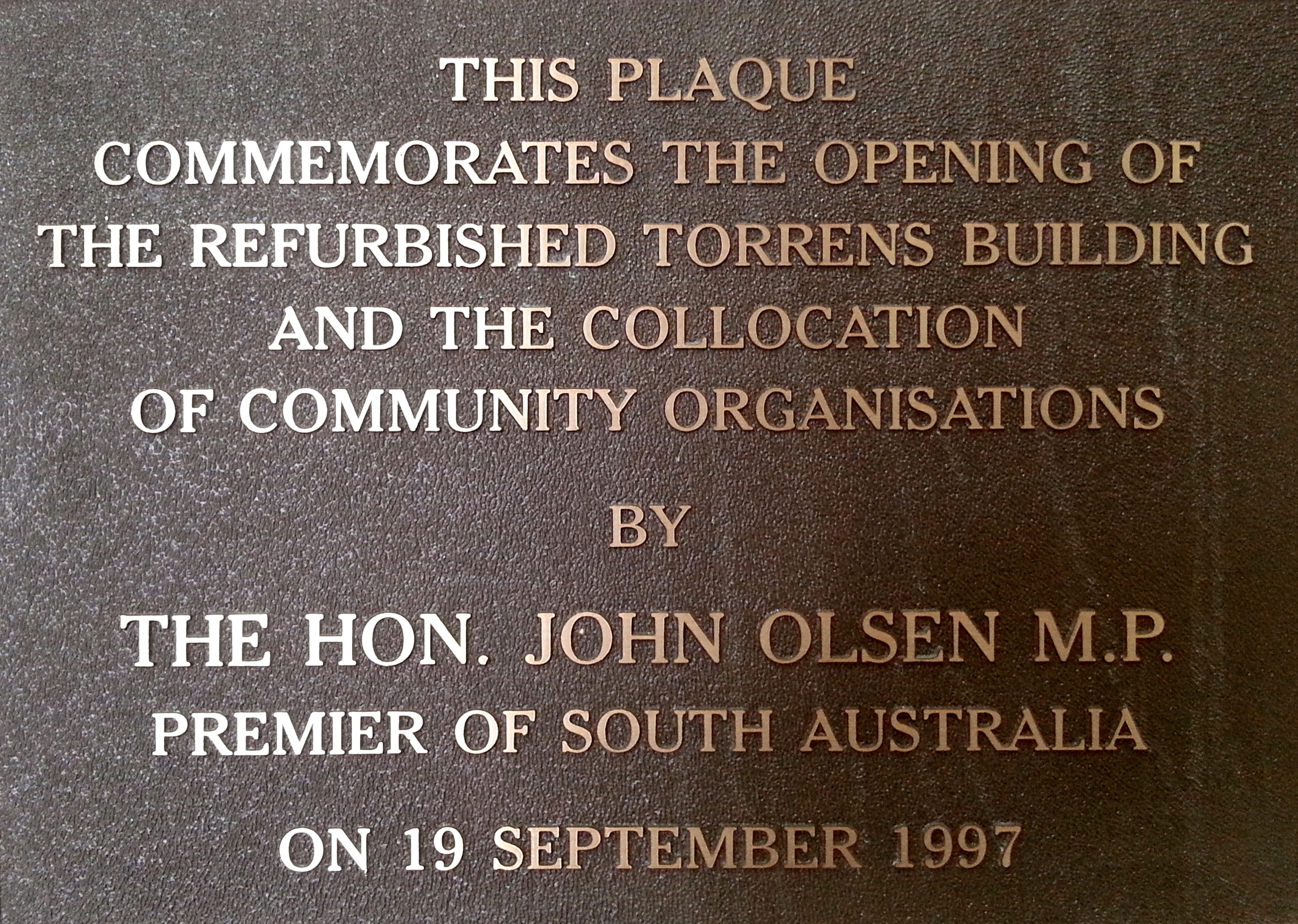
The plaque commemorating the 1997 reopening of the Torrens Building

From 1991 or 1993, after over 110 years of continuous governmental occupation, the building was closed and major refurbishment undertaken.

After its reopening by then Premier of South Australia, John Olsen, on 19 September 1997, the building was used to accommodate a number of community groups and organisations including Amnesty International (S.A. & N.T. Branch), the Amputee Association of South Australia, and the United Nations Association of Australia (S.A. Division) and Volunteering SA, for some years.

=== Universities ===
From 2005, with the intention of creating the "University City Adelaide precinct", Torrens Building housed the Australian campus of Carnegie Mellon University, running programs of the Heinz College, until its closure in 2022. The British Cranfield University ran a campus in the building from 2007 to 2010, and University College London's School of Energy and Resources was based there from 2009 until December 2017. The new Torrens University, the first new university in Australia for 20 years, opened in the Torrens Building in 2013 and started teaching in 2014. However, on 3 August 2015 it opened a new campus on Wakefield Street, and as of 2019 no longer lists Torrens Building as another campus.

In 2015, the Torrens Building was offered for sale as part of the State Administration Centre precinct by the Government of South Australia, previously having been excluded from the sale plans, but as of 2019 had not been sold and has apparently been withdrawn from the market.

== Heritage listings ==
On 21 March 1978, it was added to the Register of the National Estate (now a non-statutory archive, viewable on the National Heritage Database), described as "the best remaining example in Adelaide of Italian Renaissance or Neo Classical style with a Palladian composition".

On 28 May 1981, it was listed on the South Australian Heritage Register.

== Notable Features ==
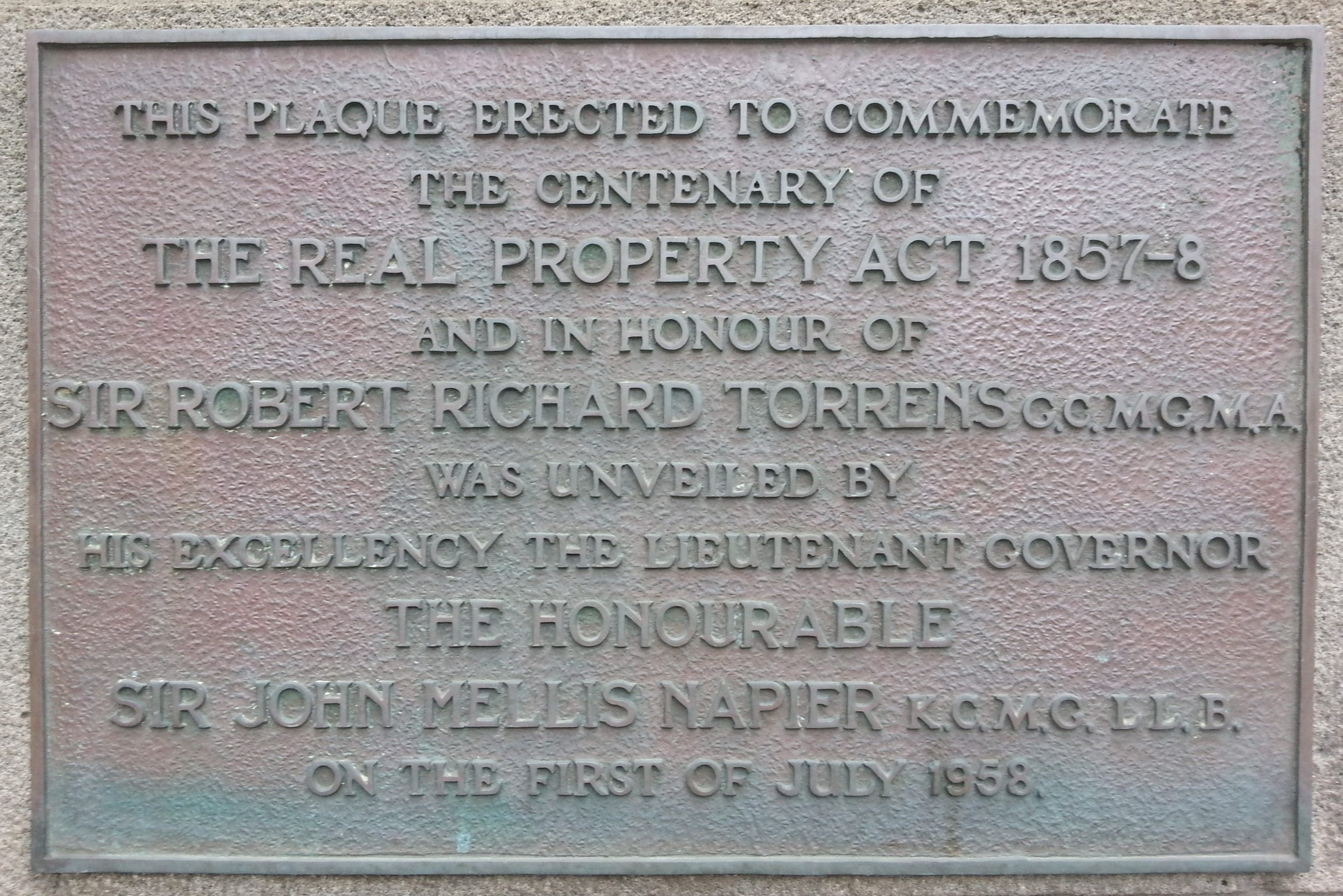
The plaque commemorating the centenary of the Real Property Act 1858

A plaque on the Western wall exterior commemorates the centenary of the Real Property Act 1858, which provides for the Torrens Title system of land registration and transfer, developed in South Australia and adopted around the world. The plaque was unveiled on 1 July 1958 by then Lieutenant Governor of South Australia, Sir Mellis Napier.

The Torrens Building houses an honour board displaying the names of Government of South Australia employees killed in World War I.

== Previous Significant Tenants ==
- Architect-in-Chief's Department (1881–?)
- Lands Titles Office (1881–?)
- Public Works Department (1881–?)
- Cranfield University (2007–2010)
- University College London's School of Energy and Resources (2009 – December 2017)
