= Mark Wessel =

American education administrator

Mark Wessel was the Dean of the H. John Heinz III College at Carnegie Mellon University from 2004 to 2008. Prior to becoming Dean, Wessel held leadership positions within the Heinz College as Acting Dean, Chief Operating Officer, Senior Associate Dean, and Associate Dean as well overseeing a number of Masters programs. He is currently a lecturer in Economics and Public Policy.

Wessel joined the Heinz College faculty in 1993. Before his tenure at Carnegie Mellon, Wessel was a development specialist with the Mon Valley Initiative, assistant to the associate dean and undergraduate economics advisor at the University of Wisconsin - Madison, and economist and financial analyst for the United States Department of Energy. Wessel holds a Bachelor in International Economic Development from Georgetown University's School of Foreign Service graduating Phi Beta Kappa and a Master of Science in economics from the University of Wisconsin–Madison.

Wessel was first appointed interim Dean of the Heinz College in 2003 and became the permanent Dean in 2004. On August 15, 2008, Wessel tendered his resignation as Dean after questions were raised regarding a master's degree awarded to a Heinz student in 2004. The incident, which the university described as "an error in judgement," concerned "the approval of excessive transfer credits and excessive units for independent study in lieu of coursework."

Wessel is married to Heinz College professor and former Dean Linda C. Babcock.
