= Maxence Langlois-Berthelot =

French senior civil servant and cultural administrator

- Born: 22 May 1972 (age 54); Paris, France
- Education: École normale supérieure; Sciences Po Paris; École nationale d'administration
- Occupations: Arts administrator; civil servant

General Administrator of the Louvre
- In office 2018–2021

Cultural advisor to the Prime Minister of France
- In office 2025–incumbent

Maxence Langlois-Berthelot (born 22 May 1972) is a French senior civil servant and cultural administrator. He has served as General Administrator of the Louvre (2018–2021), Rapporteur-General of the États généraux de l'information (2023–2024), and, since March 2025, as Culture and Audiovisual Adviser to Prime Minister François Bayrou.

== Biography ==
Langlois-Berthelot was born on 22 May 1972 in Paris. He studied at the École normale supérieure, Sciences Po Paris, and the École nationale d'administration (ENA).

After graduating from ENA, Langlois-Berthelot joined the Inspection générale des finances (IGF). In 2007, he co-authored the report Rapport sur la valorisation de la recherche with Emmanuel Macron and Pierre-Alain de Malleray for the IGF and the Inspection générale de l’administration de l’éducation nationale et de la recherche (IGAENR). In the late 2000s, he served as innovation adviser in the cabinet of Finance Minister Christine Lagarde. From 2011 to 2016, he was chief executive of Archidata, a subsidiary of the Caisse des Dépôts.

In 2016, Langlois-Berthelot served as interim executive director of the International Alliance for the Protection of Heritage in Conflict Areas (ALIPH). On 12 July 2018, Langlois-Berthelot was appointed General Administrator of the Louvre. He oversaw the museum’s administrative, financial, and operational management until 2021. In March 2020, during the COVID-19 pandemic, he was widely quoted in international media addressing staff concerns, stating that the museum was taking health risks seriously.

In October 2023, Langlois-Berthelot was appointed Rapporteur-General of the États généraux de l’information (EGI), a national consultation on media and information reform in France. He coordinated the committee's final report, which was published in September 2024.

On 6 March 2025, he was appointed Culture and Audiovisual Adviser and Head of the Culture and Media Unit in the cabinet of Prime Minister François Bayrou.
