= Dan Martin (drama educator) =

Dan J. Martin is the dean of the College of Fine Arts and the Stanley and Marcia Gumberg Professor in the School of Drama at Carnegie Mellon University in Pittsburgh, Pennsylvania, USA. Martin has been at Carnegie Mellon since 1992 when he joined the faculty to lead and develop the Master of Arts Management (MAM) Program, jointly with the Heinz College, that provides professional graduate-level management training for not-for-profit arts/culture organizations. Martin also established the Master of Entertainment Industry Management (MEIM) Programs and the Center for Arts Management and Technology. Since 2004, Martin has taught annually at the University of Bologna (Italy) in the Gestione e Innovazione delle Organizzazioni Culturali e Artistiche (GIOCA) — Management and Innovation in Arts and Culture Organizations.

Martin has also served as president of the Theatre Association of Pennsylvania, as president of the Association of Arts Administration Educators and as Managing Director of Classic Stage Company.
