= Jack Chow =

American professor of public health

Jack Chow is an American professor of public health. He holds the position of Distinguished Service Professor at Carnegie Mellon University Heinz College. Chow held a number of global public health offices including positions as the first Assistant Director-General of the World Health Organization on HIV/AIDS, Tuberculosis, and Malaria, Special Representative of the U.S. Secretary of State on Global HIV/AIDS and Deputy Assistant Secretary of State for Health and Science. This was a first - "first U.S. diplomat of ambassador rank appointed to a public health mission."

In 2020, Chow, along with over 130 other former Republican national security officials, signed a statement that asserted that President Trump was unfit to serve another term, and "To that end, we are firmly convinced that it is in the best interest of our nation that Vice President Joe Biden be elected as the next President of the United States, and we will vote for him."

== Education ==
- BA, Political Science, University of Pennsylvania
- MS, University of California, Berkeley School of Public Health – UCSF Joint Medical Program
- MD, Medicine, University of California, San Francisco - School of Medicine
- MPA, International Policy, Harvard University Kennedy School of Government
- MBA, Finance, The University of Chicago - Booth School of Business
- CFA, Chartered Financial Analyst
