= Emiliano Bolongaita =

Filipino-Australian academic and anti-corruption advocate

Emiliano "Emil" P. Bolongaita is a Filipino academic, anti-corruption advocate, and international development specialist. He is currently a Principal Knowledge Specialist (Innovation) in the Climate Change and Sustainable Development Department at the Asian Development Bank (ADB). He formerly served as Executive Director of Carnegie Mellon University Australia (CMUA) and holds the title of Distinguished Service Professor of Public Policy and Management at Carnegie Mellon University.

== Education ==
Bolongaita received his PhD in Government and International Studies and a Master of Arts in International Peace Studies from the University of Notre Dame (1989). He graduated with a Bachelor of Arts degree in Philosophy from Ateneo de Manila University in the Philippines.

== Career ==
=== Carnegie Mellon University Australia ===
Bolongaita joined Carnegie Mellon University Australia in August 2013 as Deputy Executive Director and was appointed Executive Director in 2014. He led the campus until it announced the wind-down of operations in June 2022, citing the impact of COVID-19 and changes in the international higher education market.

=== Asian Development Bank ===
Prior to his appointment at CMUA, Bolongaita held senior roles at the Asian Development Bank. He served as Unit Head of the Central Asia Regional Economic Cooperation Program (CAREC) and as a Public Management Specialist in the Bank's South Asia Department. After leaving Carnegie Mellon Australia, he returned to ADB as Principal Knowledge Specialist (Innovation) in the Climate Change and Sustainable Development Department.

=== World Bank and USAID ===
Bolongaita worked at the World Bank as director of the Global Distance Learning Program on Anti-Corruption in Asia-Pacific. He also headed the Public Sector Governance Group of the Economic Governance Technical Assistance Program at the United States Agency for International Development (USAID) in the Philippines.

=== Academic positions ===
In his academic career, Bolongaita has been a visiting professor at the Elliott School of International Affairs at George Washington University, taught public policy at the National University of Singapore, and served on the faculty of the Asian Institute of Management.

=== Anti-corruption advocacy ===
Fighting corruption in developing countries has been central to Bolongaita's career. He is co-editor and contributor of Challenging Corruption in Asia: Case Studies and a Framework for Action, published by the World Bank in 2004. In 2010, he authored a comparative study of anti-corruption agencies for the Chr. Michelsen Institute's U4 Anti-Corruption Resource Centre, examining why Indonesia's Corruption Eradication Commission succeeded while similar bodies in other countries did not.

Bolongaita serves on the board of Integrity Initiatives International (III), a non-governmental organization advocating for the establishment of an International Anti-Corruption Court modeled after the International Criminal Court.

=== Awards ===
In 2004, Bolongaita received the inaugural Kroc Institute Distinguished Alumni Award for an anti-corruption project he oversaw in Manila, Philippines.

== Selected publications ==
- Bhargava, Vinay K.; Bolongaita, Emil P. (2004). Challenging Corruption in Asia: Case Studies and a Framework for Action. Washington, D.C.: World Bank. ISBN 978-0-8213-5683-8.
- Bolongaita, Emil P. (2010). An exception to the rule? Why Indonesia's Anti-Corruption Commission succeeds where others don't - a comparison with the Philippines' Ombudsman (Report). U4 Issue 2010:4. Chr. Michelsen Institute.
