= Charles T. Moran =

American political operative (born 1980)

Charles Moran
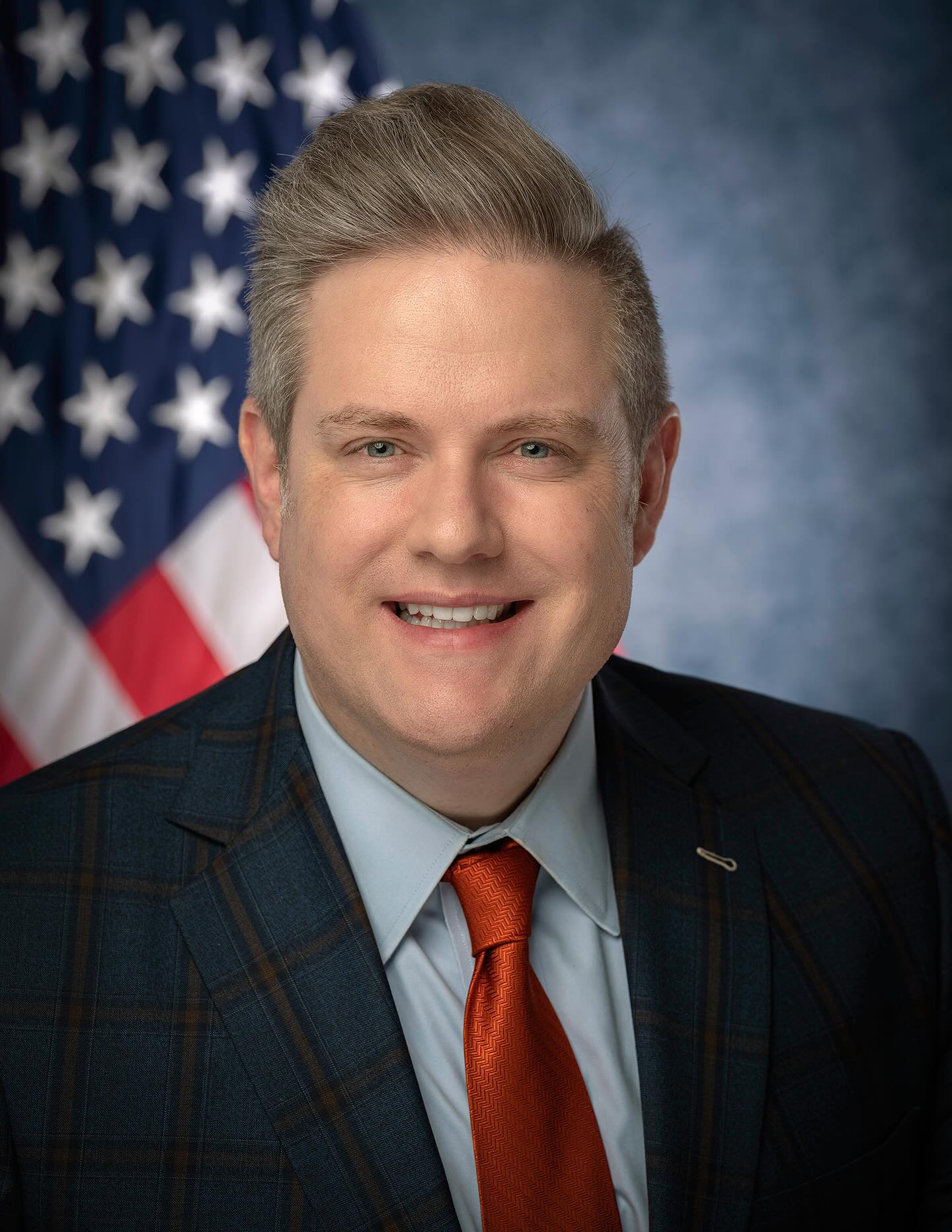
- Official portrait, 2025
- Born: Charles Thomas Moran; September 27, 1980 (age 45); Los Angeles, California, U.S.
- Education: Occidental College (BA); Pepperdine University (MA)

Charles Thomas Moran (born September 27, 1980) is an American political operative who has served as associate administrator for external affairs at the National Nuclear Security Administration since 2025.

Moran graduated from Occidental College with a bachelor's degree in politics and from the Pepperdine University School of Public Policy with a master's degree in public policy. He began working for the California Republican Party in 1999 as a staffer. Moran was the media director for California's delegation to the 2008 Republican National Convention. By April 2009, he had become a spokesman for the Log Cabin Republicans. Moran became the California chapter's vice president by March 2010. He worked for former Utah governor Jon Huntsman Jr.'s 2012 presidential campaign, the actor Antonio Sabàto Jr.'s 2018 California's 26th congressional district campaign, and the businessman John H. Cox's 2018 gubernatorial campaign.

In September 2019, Moran became the managing director of the Log Cabin Republicans after Jerri Ann Henry's resignation, following the organization's endorsement of Donald Trump for president in the 2020 election. He aligned the organization with Trumpism. Moran resigned in January 2025 to seek a job in the second Trump administration. By August, he had become the associate administrator for external affairs at the National Nuclear Security Administration.

== Early life and education ==
Charles Thomas Moran was born on September 27, 1980, in the San Pedro neighborhood of Los Angeles, California. His father was a firefighter, while his mother was a flight attendant. Moran graduated from Occidental College with a bachelor's degree in politics and from the Pepperdine University School of Public Policy with a master's degree in public policy. In 1999, he began working as a staffer in the California Republican Party. At Occidental, Moran came out as gay. He was the president of Sigma Alpha Epsilon's chapter at Occidental.

== Career ==
=== Political consultancy and spokesmanship (2003–2019) ===
Moran was the media director for California's delegation to the 2008 Republican National Convention. By April 2009, Moran had become a spokesman for the Log Cabin Republicans, an organization for LGBT advocacy within the Republican Party. He became the California chapter's vice president by March 2010. By October, Moran began serving as the spokesman for Steve Cooley, the district attorney of Los Angeles County. Moran was among the participants set to appear on Rob Lowe's Potomac Fever on E!, a cancelled reality show. He worked for former Utah governor Jon Huntsman Jr.'s 2012 presidential campaign, the actor Antonio Sabàto Jr.'s 2018 California's 26th congressional district campaign, and the businessman John H. Cox's 2018 gubernatorial campaign.

=== President of the Log Cabin Republicans (2019–2025) ===
In August 2019, Jerri Ann Henry resigned as the Log Cabin Republicans's executive director, following the organization's endorsement of Donald Trump for president in the 2020 election. Moran became its managing director the following month. He aligned the organization with Trumpism; Moran had assisted in Trump's 2016 and 2020 presidential campaigns, and later assisted in Trump's 2024 campaign. In September 2023, Moran, among others, brought forth a California Republican Party draft proposal that would remove references to opposition to abortion and same-sex marriage. The proposal was rejected. He was a delegate at the 2024 Republican National Convention. In January 2025, Moran resigned as president to seek a job in the second Trump administration.

=== Associate administrator for external affairs (2025–present) ===
By August 2025, Moran had become the associate administrator for external affairs at the National Nuclear Security Administration. That month, The New York Times reported that Moran had been leading the A-Gays, an informal association of homosexual men working in the Trump administration.

== Views ==
=== Identity and sexual issues ===
Moran supports a compromise between anti-LGBT and pro-LGBT activists. In an interview with the Los Angeles Times, he advocated for having children wait until they are sixteen to transition, delaying classroom instruction about sexual orientation and gender identity until sixth grade, and limiting sexually explicit drag performances to adult audiences. Moran is a proponent of limiting presidential authority on LGBT issues, including transgender rights.

=== Domestic affairs ===
In his interview with the Los Angeles Times, Moran stated that, though he is a Republican, he believes in climate change and supports the Democratic Party's platform on education and working-class people. He praised Donald Trump's economic policies in an interview in January 2025.

== Works cited ==
=== Articles ===
- Barabak, Mark (June 13, 2023). "Think 'gay Republican' is a contradiction? Think again". Los Angeles Times.
- Ferrannini, John (January 30, 2025). "Trump nominee Bessent becomes 1st gay Treasury secretary". Bay Area Reporter.
- Gardiner, Dustin; Korte, Lara (September 27, 2023). "A seismic shift to the right". Politico.
- Gordon, Larry (March 14, 2015). "Sigma Alpha Epsilon frat had numerous issues in California — before Oklahoma". Los Angeles Times.
- Haberman, Maggie (June 21, 2011). "Huntsman raising off civil unions". Politico.
- Haberman, Maggie (August 26, 2020). "After Three Years of Attacking L.G.B.T.Q. Rights, Trump Suddenly Tries Outreach". The New York Times.
- Itkowitz, Colby (August 27, 2019). "Republican LGBTQ rights group's executive director is the latest to leave after its endorsement of Trump". The Washington Post.
- Johnson, Chris (September 13, 2019). "Will Trump appoint the first gay national security adviser?". Washington Blade.
- Korte, Lara (September 30, 2023). "California GOP rejects effort to strip abortion, same sex marriage from platform". Politico.
- Libit, Daniel (April 23, 2009). "Ex-Clinton aide's film touts outing". Politico.
- McCreesh, Shawn (August 26, 2025). "Donald Trump's Big Gay Government". The New York Times.
- Mehta, Seema (January 16, 2018). "Antonio Sabato Jr.'s risque film roles have conservatives questioning his congressional candidacy". Los Angeles Times.
- Mehta, Seema (May 27, 2021). "Multimillionaire recall candidate John Cox owes consultants from failed gubernatorial bid". Los Angeles Times.
- Mehta, Seema (July 12, 2024). "Proposed GOP platform silent on same-sex marriage". Los Angeles Times.
- Mehta, Seema; Mason, Melanie (March 1, 2025). "State GOP formally welcomes gays to the party". Los Angeles Times.
- Orr, Gabby (August 7, 2020). "The Wedge Issue That's Dividing Trumpworld". Politico Magazine.
- Parker, Ashley (January 21, 2011). "Reality TV? Not Really, the Capital Says". The New York Times.
- Sabalow, Ryan (September 4, 2008). "Two north state women attend GOP convention". Redding Record Searchlight.
- Schultz, E. J. (March 9, 2010). "'I am gay,' Sen. Ashburn says". The Fresno Bee.
- Willon, Phil (October 29, 2010). "L.A. a hurdle for Harris". Los Angeles Times.

=== Documents ===
- "Charles Moran". United States Department of Energy.
- "Charles Thomas Moran in the California Birth Index, 1905-1995" (Document). California Birth Index.
