= John Patrick Crecine =

American educator and economist

9th President of the Georgia Institute of Technology
- In office 1987–1994
- Preceded by: Joseph M. Pettit
- Succeeded by: G. Wayne Clough

Personal details
- Born: August 22, 1939 Detroit, Michigan
- Died: April 28, 2008 (aged 68) Pittsburgh, Pennsylvania

John Patrick "Pat" Crecine (August 22, 1939 – April 28, 2008) was an American educator and economist who served as President of Georgia Tech, Dean at Carnegie Mellon University, business executive, and professor. After receiving his early education at public schools in Lansing, Michigan, he earned a bachelor's degree in industrial management, and master's and doctoral degrees in industrial administration from the Graduate School of Industrial Administration (now called Tepper School of Business) at Carnegie Mellon University. He also spent a year at the Stanford University School of Business.

== Michigan ==
Dr. Crecine's academic career began at the University of Michigan, where he established the country's first graduate program in public policy in 1968 as the first Director of the Institute of Public Policy Studies, IPPS, (now the Gerald Ford School of Public Policy), while also holding academic appointments in political science and sociology. While at Michigan, Crecine established a joint Law and Public Policy program with the Michigan Law School and joint Ph.D. programs with Economics, Political Science, Sociology, Urban and Regional Planning, and Industrial Engineering, each of which were represented in the core curriculum of the IPPS Masters Program.

While at Michigan, he interrupted his teaching several times to serve the federal government as an economist, statistician, and consultant, and to work as an economist with the RAND Corporation. He earned tenure in 1968 and full professorships in Political Science and Sociology in 1970.

== Carnegie Mellon ==
In 1976, he became dean of Carnegie Mellon's Dietrich College of Humanities and Social Sciences and Professor of Political Economy in the Department of Social and Decision Sciences and in the School of Urban and Public Affairs (now Heinz College). As Dean he conceived of and implemented a core curriculum, described by the Education Editor of the New York Times as "the most innovative in America", and added departments of Statistics, Social and Decision Sciences, Philosophy, and several research centers in the cognitive sciences, design, and computational linguistics to the College. Following a year as Visiting Fellow Commoner at the University of Cambridge, he was appointed Senior Vice President and Provost in 1983, with administrative responsibility for Carnegie Mellon's academic, research, and systems development in computing Andrew Project and computer science and initiated, with Prof. Raj Reddy, the formation of the Carnegie Mellon School of Computer Science (which became the first such college in the country). He was also the founding chief executive officer of the Inter-university Consortium for Educational Computing, an association of research universities. In 1986, he was the first chief administrative officer and oversaw the founding of the University Athletic Association, an NCAA Division III Conference.

Crecine returned to Carnegie Mellon in the fall of 2006 as Distinguished Service Professor at the Heinz College.

== Georgia Tech ==
In 1987, Dr. Crecine became the ninth president of the Georgia Institute of Technology. In addition to his administrative responsibilities, Dr. Crecine held a joint appointment as tenured professor in the new School of International Affairs, and the School of Industrial and Systems Engineering. During his tenure, he initiated the establishment of three new colleges at Tech: the College of Computing (the first such college in the country); the Ivan Allen College of Management, Policy, and International Affairs; and the College of Sciences. He also served as Chairman of the Georgia Tech Athletic Association and as President of the Georgia Tech Research Corporation. During his tenure as President, the College of Engineering's ranking climbed from 14th to 9th in the country, the institution was transformed from a specialized institution to a top-30 national university, SAT scores of Fall entering freshmen for 1992, 1993, and 1994 rose to become the highest of any public research university in the U.S., graduation rates increased by nearly 12 percent, student facilities and housing (including those under construction) were doubled from those of the previous 102 years of the institution's existence, and sponsored research awards more than doubled.

=== Athletics ===
During Crecine's tenure and under Athletic Director Homer Rice's leadership, Georgia Tech's intercollegiate athletic programs thrived with the football team winning the NCAA national championship in 1990, the basketball team going to the NCAA "Final Four" in 1990 along with several ACC championships, and the baseball team going to the 1994 College World Series. During Dr. Crecine's tenure, Georgia Tech student-athletes had roughly the same graduation rates as other Georgia Tech students.

=== Reorganization ===
In 1988, Crecine proposed a controversial restructuring of the university. The Institute at that point had four colleges: the College of Engineering, the College of Management, the College of Architecture, and the catch-all COSALS, the College of Sciences and Liberal Studies. Crecine proposed the reorganization of the latter two into the College of Computing, the College of Sciences, and the Ivan Allen College of Management, Policy, and International Affairs. A significant feature of the proposed reorganization was, in addition to creating degree programs in international affairs and public policy, was allowing faculty in the social sciences and humanities to develop degree programs in addition to traditional service courses and to add programs in the fine and performing arts to the College of Architecture and Design's programs. The proposals generally represented an action plan for creating a "technological university for the 21st Century" and an elaboration of Crecine's April, 1988 Inaugural Address. Although the Institute historian August Geibelhaus states that "Crecine announced the changes without asking for input, and consequently many faculty members disliked him for his top-down management style", Crecine asked the Faculty Senate in August 1988 to appoint and form committees for each of the three proposed new colleges to comment on the advisability of the proposed reorganization and to suggest improvements in the proposals. Although the Faculty Senate initially resisted the formation of the three committees, they were all formed and chaired by faculty not part of the administration, who supported the proposals with modest changes. In June 1989, the administration sent out ballots, and the proposed changes passed, with a slim margin among the academic faculty (52%-48%) and with a wider margin among the research faculty (75%-25%). The proposed reorganization was approved unanimously by the Board of Regents of the State University System of Georgia. The restructuring took effect in January 1990. While Crecine was seen in a poor light by many of the faculty at the time, the changes he made are considered visionary.

== Post-academic career ==
Dr. Crecine's resignation as President of Georgia Tech took effect in July 1994. Dr. Crecine was associated with several start-up companies involved in Information Technology, ecommerce, and the internet and at the time of his death was CEO of B.P.T., Inc. a consulting firm. He served as a member of the Board of Directors of several public companies: Intermet Corporation (1993–2005), Web.com (formerly Interland Corporation, 2003–present), Liebert Corporation (1982–1987), 796 (Pittsburgh Baseball Club Ownership Group, 1982–87), NeXT Computer, Inc. (1987–1990), HBOC, Inc. (1992–1998), Total eMed (1999–2000), and numerous non-profit and charitable organizations.
