= Jeffrey Hunker =

American cyber security consultant and writer (1957–2013)

Jeffrey Hunker (January 20, 1957 – May 31, 2013) was an American cyber security consultant and writer.

== Biography ==
Hunker received his bachelor's degree from Harvard College and Ph.D. from Harvard Business School. He joined the Boston Consulting Group before becoming an advisor in the Department of Commerce and the founding director of the Critical Infrastructure Assurance Office (later subsumed by the Department of Homeland Security National Protection and Programs Directorate). This led him to serve on the National Security Council as the Senior Director for Critical Infrastructure.

Hunker was also a Vice President at Kidder, Peabody & Co., dean of the Heinz College at Carnegie Mellon, and a member of the Council on Foreign Relations. He is credited with coining the term cyberinfrastructure and has worked closely with Richard A. Clarke on cyberterrorism issues. Hunker's research is primarily concerned with Homeland and Information Security. Prof. Hunker was also the Carnegie Mellon Representation for the Institute for Information Infrastructure Protection.

In 2008 Hunker was charged three times with driving under the influence, followed by another incident on Thanksgiving 2009. In May 2010 Hunker pleaded guilty to these four drunken driving charges and was sentenced to 3 to 6 months in jail. He was paroled at sentencing and was sentenced to 24 months probation. This sentence was terminated early on June 2, 2011.

In 2010 his book Creeping Failure: How We Broke the Internet and What We Can Do to Fix It was published by McClelland and Stewart, a division of Random House. Creeping Failure is a Scientific American magazine Recommended Book. In 2011 a second edition was released. Also in 2010 he was co-editor of Insider Threats in Cyber Security and his article (co-authored with Christian Probst)The Risk of Risk Analysis and its Relation to the Economics of Insider Threats appears in The Economics of Information Security and Privacy.

Until 2013, he was Visiting Scholar in the Computer Science Department at the University of California, Davis, and was also consulting with a major philanthropic foundation in Pittsburgh. His most recent books are, as co-editor and contributor, Insider Threats in Cyber Security (Springer, 2010), and Cybersecurity: Shared Risks, Shared Responsibilities (Carolina Academic Press, 2012). Dr. Hunker died on May 31, 2013.
