= Main Building, U.S. Bureau of Mines =

- U.S. National Register of Historic Places
- Pittsburgh Landmark – PHLF
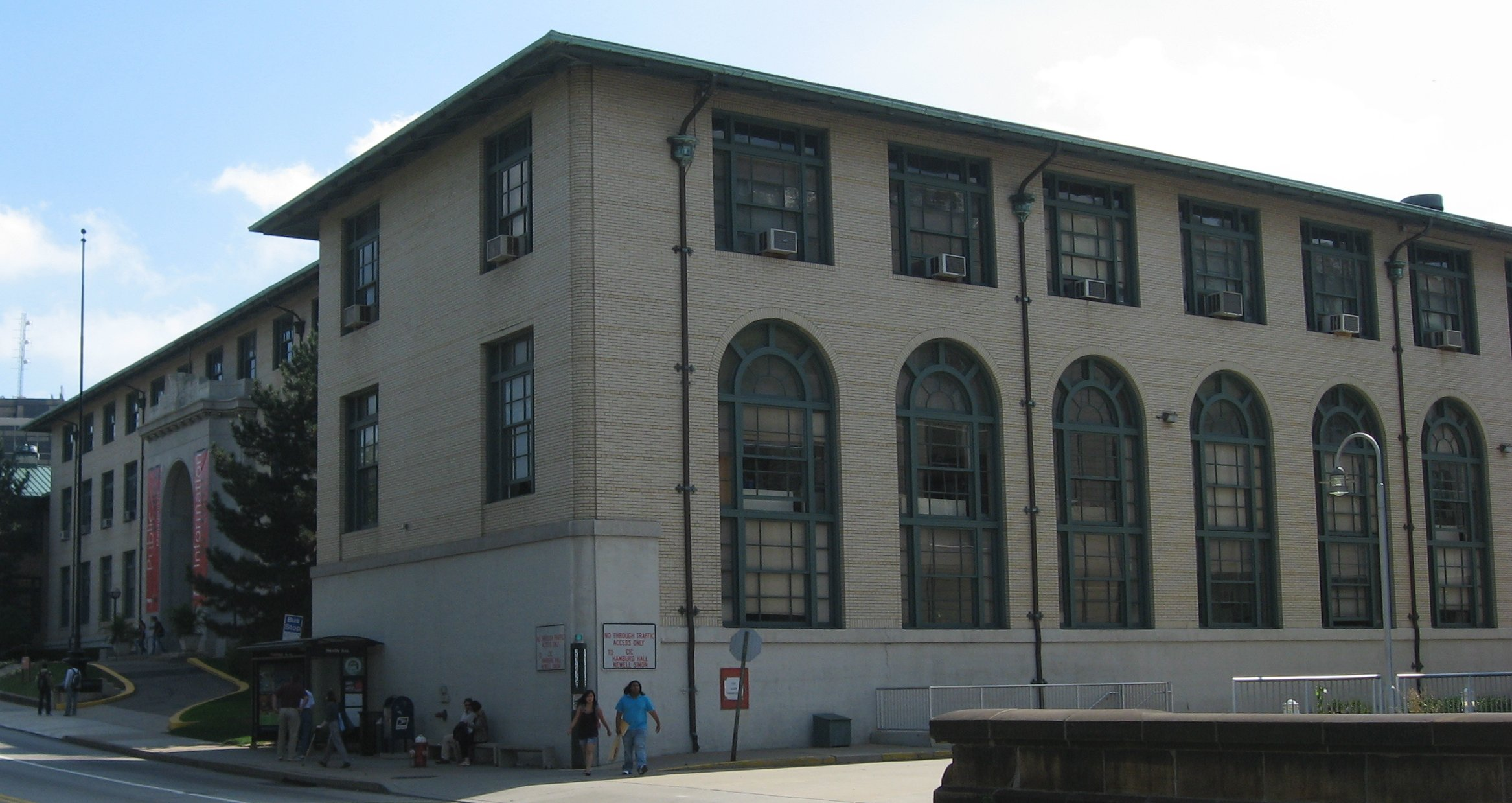

- Location within Pittsburgh Location within Pennsylvania Location within the United States
- Location: 4800 Forbes Ave., Pittsburgh, Pennsylvania, U.S.
- Coordinates: 40°26′39″N 79°56′45″W
- Area: less than one acre
- Built: 1915–17
- Architect: Palmer & Hornbostel; Henry Hornbostel
- Architectural style: Beaux Arts
- NRHP reference No.: 74001741

Significant dates
- Added to NRHP: May 24, 1974
- Designated PHLF: 2000

The Main Building of the U.S. Bureau of Mines is the former main building of the United States Bureau of Mines Central Experiment Station.

It was listed on the National Register of Historic Places in 1974.

== History and architectural features ==
Located in the Squirrel Hill North neighborhood of Pittsburgh, Pennsylvania, this historic structure was built between 1915 and 1917 and dedicated on September 29, 1919. The building was designed by Henry Hornbostel, who was also responsible for several nearby buildings at Carnegie Mellon University. The university purchased the complex from the Bureau of Mines in 1985. The main building, also known as Building A, was renamed Hamburg Hall and is now the headquarters of the Heinz College.

The main building was listed on the National Register of Historic Places in 1974.
