= Carnegie Mellon University, Australia =

University in South Australia

Carnegie Mellon University Australia
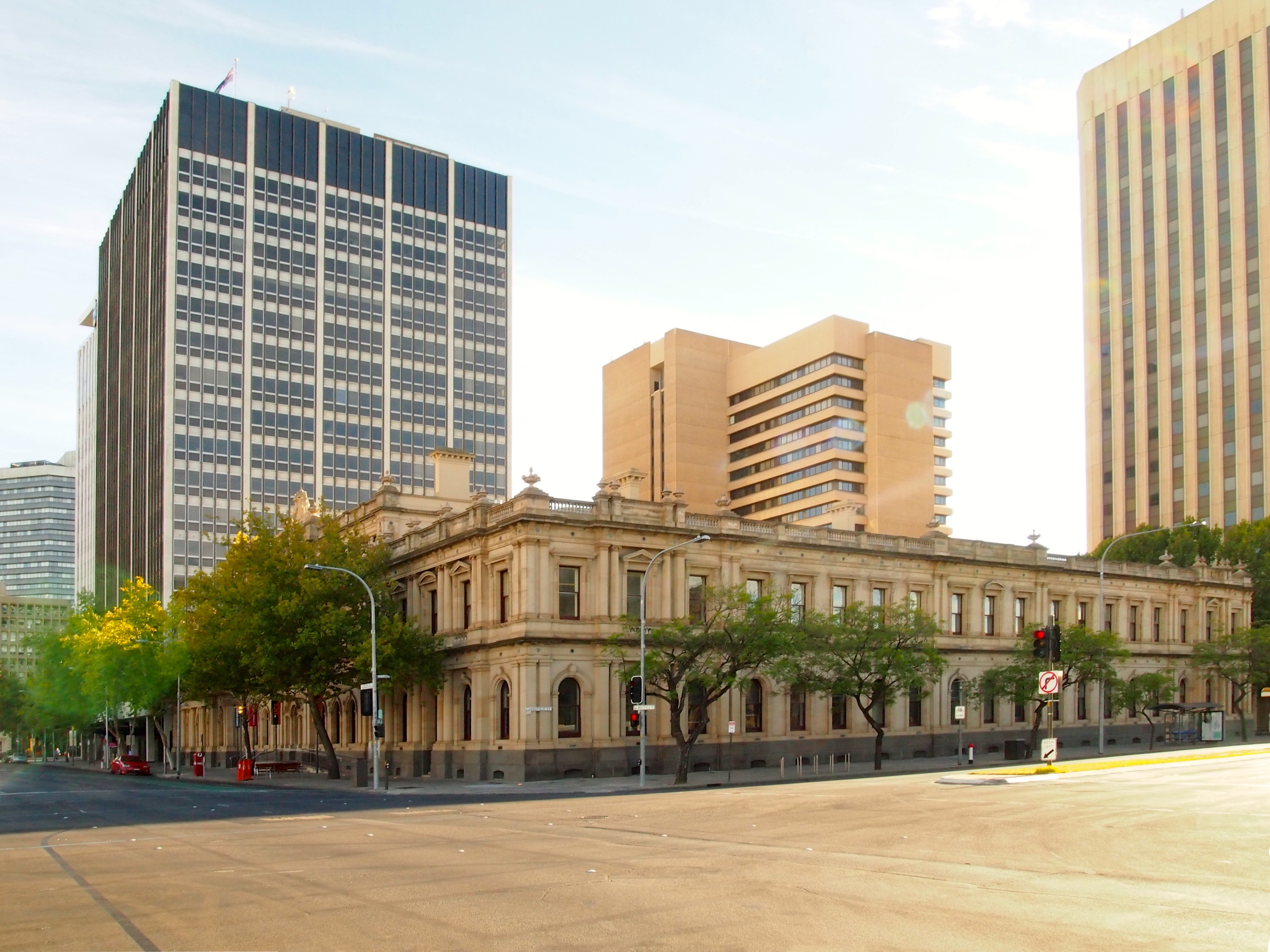
- The Heinz College campus, in the historic Torrens Building in Victoria Square, Adelaide
- Motto: My heart is in the work (Andrew Carnegie)
- Type: Private
- Active: 2006–2022
- President: Farnam Jahanian
- Provost: Laurie Weingart (Acting Provost)
- Director: Emil Bolongaita
- Location: Adelaide, South Australia, Australia; 34°55′41″S 138°36′03″E
- Colors: Cardinal, gray, and Tartan Plaid
- Website: www.australia.cmu.edu (closed)
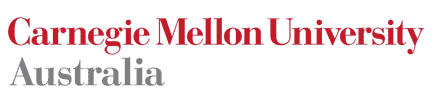

Carnegie Mellon University Australia was the Australian campus of Carnegie Mellon University's H. John Heinz III College from 2006 to 2022 in the city centre of Adelaide, South Australia. In June 2022 the operation announced it would close down. Current students were to graduate but no new students would be admitted.

The move to establish a campus in Australia was announced in Pittsburgh in 2005 by South Australian Premier Mike Rann, following negotiations with Carnegie Mellon President Jared Cohon. From 2006 to 2022, over 1200 students completed degrees there.

== Facilities and courses ==
The campus had students, faculty and staff from more than 29 countries throughout the Asia-Pacific, United States, Europe, Latin America, Africa and the Middle East. The university offered two masters degree programs: the Master of Science in Public Policy and Management, and the Master of Science in Information Technology and Management. Both programs were available as a 12-month or 21-month program, depending on the student's work experience, and could be undertaken full-time or part-time. Carnegie Mellon University Australia also offered students the opportunity to undertake Global Programs, whereby they undertook their studies at both the campus in Pittsburgh and Adelaide.

Other programs offered included an executive education program for executives and professionals and specialisations in business intelligence and data analytics and digital transformation.

In August 2011, the Software Engineering Institute (SEI) launched their Asia-Pacific operations at Carnegie Mellon University – Australia's campus in Adelaide. Through this location, the SEI were to offer their advanced courses and certifications to the Australian market, and collaborate with local companies and organisations on software development and cybersecurity.

Carnegie Mellon University was the first American university to open a campus in Australia, although the University of Notre Dame was involved in the establishment of the independent University of Notre Dame Australia. The university chose to open a campus in Adelaide as part of the South Australian Government's vision to establish Australia's first international university precinct around Victoria Square in the Adelaide city centre. Carnegie Mellon University – Australia was co-located with the University College London's School of Energy and Resources (Australia) (closed 2017), research and policy institutes including the Torrens Resilience Institute and The Australian Centre for Social Innovation, and adjacent to the location Flinders University's city facilities until 2023.

== See also ==
- List of universities in Australia
