= Ramayya Krishnan =

- Born: Ramayya Krishnan
- Citizenship: American
- Education: Indian Institute of Technology (B.Tech); Cockrell School of Engineering (M.Tech); University of Texas at Austin (PhD)
- Engineering career
- Discipline: Management science Information systems
- Institutions: Carnegie Mellon University
- Employer: Heinz College
- Awards: INFORMS Fellow (2012); Nayudamma Award (2015); Indian Institute of Technology, Madras Distinguished Alumnus (2017); Bright Internet Award (2018); National Academy of Public Administration (United States) Fellow (2019); University of Texas at Austin Outstanding Alumnus (2020)

Ramayya Krishnan is an American Management and Information technology scholar from Pittsburgh, Pennsylvania. He is the dean of Heinz College, and is the W. W. Cooper and Ruth F. Cooper Professor of Management science and Information systems at Carnegie Mellon University. Krishnan is also a past president of the Institute for Operations Research and Management Science (INFORMS).

== Early life and education ==
Krishnan has a bachelor's degree in mechanical engineering from the Indian Institute of Technology, Madras, as well as a master in Industrial engineering and Operations research and a PhD in Management science and Information systems from the University of Texas at Austin.

== Career ==
=== Research ===
Krishnan’s research has focused on the development of decision support tools to analyze, interpret, and act on consumer and social behavior in digital and networked platforms. More recently, he has focused on how sensing and learning are transforming decision making by workers in gig economy platforms.

=== Dean of Heinz College ===
A faculty member at CMU since 1988, Krishnan was appointed dean when the Heinz School of Public Policy and Management became the Heinz College of Information Systems and Public Policy in 2008. He was reappointed upon the completion of his first term as Dean in 2014, and reappointed for a second time in 2020.

As dean, Krishnan led the establishment of funded research centers including Traffic21, Metro21: Smart Cities Institute, the Living Analytics Research Centre in partnership with Singapore Management University, and the Block Center for Technology and Society.

Krishnan has served as an advisory board member and contributing researcher to organizations, events, and government bodies including the World Economic Forum, the Commonwealth of Pennsylvania, and the United States Government Accountability Office.

=== Government work ===
On April 25, 2022, the Biden administration named Krishnan to the newly created panel on artificial intelligence. This new initiative will guide disaster response, cybersecurity, privacy, and infrastructure to the federal government and the National AI Initiative Office.

== Awards ==
In 2012, Krishnan was named a fellow of the Institute for Operations Research and the Management Sciences "for leadership and innovation in academia and in practice, as well as leadership in INFORMS, linking operations research and management sciences with information systems in research, education, and management".

In 2015, Krishnan won the Nayudamma Award, awarded by the Nayudamma Centre for Development Alternatives (NCDA) and recognizing individuals around the world for their contributions in areas of sustainable development.

In 2017, Krishnan received the Distinguished Alumnus Award from the Indian Institute of Technology, Madras.

In 2018, Krishnan won the Bright Internet Award, awarded by the Korea Society of Management Information Systems for scholarly achievements and contributions in the field of management information systems.

In 2019, Krishnan was named a fellow of the National Academy of Public Administration (United States) for his "expertise and contributions to the field of public administration."

In 2020, Krishnan received the Outstanding Alumnus Award from the University of Texas at Austin.
