= Pepperdine University School of Public Policy =

Public policy school of Pepperdine University

Coordinates: 34.0348°N 118.7035°W

The Pepperdine University School of Public Policy (SPP) is a Master of Public Policy (MPP) degree program, located in Malibu, California, with summer classes offered in Washington, D.C. It is one of four graduate schools at Pepperdine University. The MPP is customized with specializations in Applied Economic Policy, American Policy and Politics, International Relations and National Security, State and Local Policy, and Public Policy Dispute Resolution.

The Master of Public Policy requires 50 units of coursework with four 3- or 4-unit courses each semester for two academic years (four semesters). The first year is primarily composed of core courses and provides a foundation for the student's specialization courses, most of which are taken in the second year.

== About ==
The School of Public Policy enrolls approximately 100 students and offers a Master of Public Policy (MPP) degree built on a distinctive philosophy of nurturing leaders to use the tools of analysis and policy design to effect successful implementation and real change. This requires critical insights balanced with personal moral certainties that only a broad exposure to great ideas, courageous thinkers, and extraordinary leaders can encourage. It prepares graduates for careers as leaders and also seeks to strengthen the institutions which lie between the federal government and the individual, including the family, religious organizations, volunteer associations, local and regional government, and nonprofit organizations.

Pepperdine's School of Public Policy opened in the fall of 1997 with a unique curriculum designed by James Q. Wilson, Jack Kemp, and Michael Novak, as a response to many of the government-centric policy programs of the time. Because of these beginnings, Pepperdine offers students a comprehensive curriculum grounded in both policy analysis and an understanding of the many factors—cultural, historical, and constitutional—that affect the implementation of public policy. The current dean of the Public Policy School is Pete N. Peterson. The current Dean Emeritus of the School of Public Policy is James Wilburn.

The School of Public Policy offers two Washington, DC Policy Scholars Program sessions at the centrally located Washington, DC, campus. Each session is a four-week, 3-credit seminar. Past seminar topics include,"American Grand Strategies in International Relations: From the American Revolution to President Trump," "Roots of American Order: Thinking Historically About Public Policy," "American Gospel: The Role of Religion in US Domestic and Foreign Policy," and "Humanizing Education Policy: A Study of Foundational Philosophies."

== Intensive Professional Learning Components ==
In addition to regular credit courses, each student is required to complete professional experiences, which are critical to developing leadership in real-world situations. Students must participate in a series of professional development experiences each semester, complete a mandatory Policy Internship, and complete a capstone project which will be developed during the final semester’s Policy Research Seminar (Capstone) for credit. This project may be presented to a board of academic and real-world practitioners and provides another assessment of individual progress in developing leadership skills and personal values. This major policy analysis, undertaken with a member of the faculty or a committee of faculty and board of visitors, is designed to provide focus and fuel for successful undertakings and to assist students with career planning.

The School of Public Policy hosts a range of professional development events throughout the academic year. These co-curricular activities are intended to provide both career-oriented professional preparation in areas such as job search strategies, career development, and networking as well as hands-on opportunities to interact with leading scholars and practitioners in the field of public policy.

== Policy Internships ==
Students are required to complete 240-hour Policy Internship in an agency or organization related to the student’s area of specialization and must be completed prior to the second semester of the second year. Such agencies may be in local, state, or federal government; nonprofit organizations; the private sector; or an international experience in a non-US setting to prepare for foreign service after graduation. The internship provides a perspective on how the methods and theories learned in the cases studied in the classroom may find practical expression in non-textbook and complex real-life settings. It is expected that most students will complete their Policy Internship during the summer between the first and second years, although provisions are made to allow it to overlap the academic year.

== Joint Degree Programs ==
Joint degree programs include the MPP/Juris Doctor degree in conjunction with the Pepperdine Rick J. Caruso School of Law, the MPP/Masters of Dispute Resolution degree in conjunction with the School of Law's number one ranked Straus Institute for Dispute Resolution and the MPP/MBA degree in conjunction with the Pepperdine Graziadio Business School.

== Davenport Institute for Public Engagement and Civic Leadership ==
The Davenport Institute for Public Policy was founded in 1996 and in 2010 partnered with the nonprofit, multi-partisan organization Common Sense California to become the Davenport Institute for Public Engagement and Civic Leadership. The mission of the institute is to help build stronger communities in California by promoting public participation in local governance. The institute has trained thousands of local government staff, elected officials, and police officers in California and across the country and has provided technical support to more than 50 cities. More than 100 practitioners have also completed the institute’s Professional Certificate in Advanced Public Engagement for Local Government, which is offered online through six weekly sessions.

Through continued course work and work-study opportunities, the Davenport Institute provides current SPP students with the skills, experience, and relationships they will need to work toward common-sense answers to today’s difficult policy problems at the local level. The institute has been instrumental in developing the School of Public Policy’s student chapter of the International City/County Management Association (ICMA), only the second such chapter in California, as well as in facilitating the annual City Manager in Residence program. In 2023, the Institute hosted the first "Mayor in Residence" program with City of Dallas' Mayor Eric Johnson serving as the inaugural designee. The institute is affiliated with the following networks and associations: Bridge Alliance, California Consortium on Public Engagement, National Civility Network, National Conference on Citizenship, and the University Network for Collaborative Government. The Institute is a contracted training partner to the International Association of Government Officials (iGO), and the California Police Chiefs' Association.

The Institute is currently led by Maureen Tobin (Executive Director) and Pooja Di Giovanna (Assistant Director), and is supported by an Advisory Council composed of leading local government officials from around the state of California.

In 2000 the institute was named in honor of David Davenport, the university’s sixth president, and an endowment of $3 million was established.

== The American Project at the School of Public Policy ==
"The American Project" launched in the wake of the 2016 national election, and was a multi-year effort to propel innovative ideas for reimagining the future of America's conservative movement. Its worked continued through the end of 2022 with a "Quest for Community" conference on the Malibu campus. Over the years, the “Project” gathered leading academics, activists and academics to explore the future of the conservative movement. Through events and an essay series featured on the website RealClearPolicy, the American Project argues for a reimagined communitarian conservatism in policy and politics. The American Project was led by SPP Dean Pete Peterson, and co-director, Rich Tafel.

== Homeland Security Advisory Council at the Pepperdine School of Public Policy ==
The Homeland Security Advisory Council at the Pepperdine School of Public Policy (HSAC@SPP) is an innovative academic enterprise focusing on disaster preparedness, crisis management, and resiliency through engaging the public, private, and civic sectors. Formed in partnership with the renowned Los Angeles Homeland Security Advisory Council, HSAC@SPP is the latest addition to the SPP's robust cross-sector initiatives, positioned to prepare the current and next generation of leaders by exploring a full range of cross-sector and information technology solutions to public policy challenges.

HSAC currently offers a variety of programs focused on technology, engagement, capability building, and partnerships for crisis managers, policymakers, and public safety professionals, in addition to students pursuing a graduate degree. Through the partnership, HSAC@SPP will expand its current offerings, create new educational and training programs, and reach a broader participant group that includes graduate students and audiences throughout California and the nation.

== Education Policy & Impact Initiative ==
The Education Policy and Impact initiative based at the SPP is a multi-year initiative intended to both prepare policy leaders as it engages current policymakers in civil discussions about the future of America's education system. Launched in the fall of 2019, this program builds upon the existing work SPP has undertaken in coursework, research, and public events. Led by noted education reform leader Hanna Skandera, who teaches a class at the policy school, the Initiative convenes policy leaders around the year in events and webinars.

In 2021, SPP alumnus, and respected education leader, Dr. Hattie Mitchell, took over as the visiting professor for Education Policy & Impact, and taught in the 2022 and 2023 academic years.

== The Edwin M. Meese III Institute ==
In 2021, the School of Public Policy announced the launch of the Edwin M. Meese III Institute, named for the renowned public servant, Ed Meese. The focus of the center is to research and highlight the role faith-based institutions play in the shaping and delivery of public services.

== School of Public Policy Events ==
The School of Public Policy is host to several noteworthy visiting scholars, public- and private-sector officials, and policy leaders, providing students the chance to interact with those responsible for shaping policy in their respective fields.

Featured events include:

- Let Freedom Ring, Celebrating 25 Years of the School of Public Policy,

Featured Speakers: Distinguished Senior Fellow, Robert C. O'Brien and Taube Professor of International Relations and Politics, Kiron Skinner.

- Evening Conversations in Washington DC:The Moral Sense in Politics and Policy,

Past Speakers Include: Rod Dreher, Journalist; Ronald C. White, Author and Historian; Andy Crouch, Author; Ross Douthat, New York Times' columnist, and U.S. senator Tim Scott.

- Patricia Tagliaferri Dean's Distinguished Lecture Series,

Featured Speakers Include: Niall Ferguson, Senior Fellow at the Hoover Institution, Stanford University; Dr. Charles Murray, American political scientist, writer, and public speaker; Dennis Prager; Secretary of Education Betsy DeVos; Glenn Loury, Merton Stoltz Professor, Brown University; Victor Davis Hanson, Martin and Illie Anderson Senior Fellow in Residence in Classics and Military History at the Hoover Institution, Stanford University

- Charles & Rosemary Licata Lecture, Featured Speakers Include: Dr. Jeffrey Sikkenga, Spring 2018 William E. Simon Distinguished Visiting Professor, School of Public Policy; Dr. Gordon Lloyd, Senior Fellow at the Ashbrook Center and the Dockson Professor Emeritus of Public Policy at Pepperdine; Dr. Joseph Loconte, associate professor of history, The King's College, New York; Edward J. Larson, University Professor of History and Darling Chair in Law, Pepperdine University
- Series: Viewpoint Diversity in American Higher Education: How Far Left to Go?,

Past speakers Include: Jon Shields, associate professor, Claremont McKenna College; Samual J. Abrama, American Enterprise Institute; Gerard Alexander, University of Virginia; Eliot Cohen, Johns Hopkins School of Advanced International Studies; James Gimpel, University of Maryland, Samuel Goldman, The George Washington University

== Honor Society ==
The School of Public Policy has a chapter of the Pi Alpha Alpha Honor Society. Pi Alpha Alpha is the National Honor Society for Public Affairs and Administration which was created to recognize and promote excellence in the study and practice of public affairs and administration.

== Affiliations ==
Institutional member:

- The Association for Public Policy Analysis and Management
- The National Association for Schools of Public Affairs and Administration
- The Public Policy and International Affairs Fellowship Program
- Associate of Professional Schools of International Affairs
- Public Interest Technology University Network
- University Network for Collaborative Governance

== Partners ==
The School of Public Policy is a student recruiting partner with:

- Council for Christian Colleges & Universities (CCCU)
- Young America’s Freedom Foundation (YAF)
- Intercollegiate Studies Institute (ISI)
- The Fund for American Studies (TFAS)
- Public Policy & International Affairs Program (PPIA)
- City Year Alumni University Partner
- Golden Key International Honour Society
- Millennium Momentum Foundation
- Rangel International Affairs Program
- Teach for America

Training Program Partners:

- International City/County Management Association (ICMA)
- California Police Chiefs Association
- International Association of Government Officials (iGO
- Engaging Local Government Leaders (ELGL)

== Distinguished Visiting Faculty ==
Notable faculty members who have lectured at the School of Public Policy include:

- Lanhee Chen
- Victor Davis Hanson
- Steven F. Hayward
- Bruce Herschensohn Television and Radio Political Commentator
- Angela Hawken
- Kevin Faulconer
- Karen Elliott House
- Douglas Kmiec
- Daniel Pipes.
- Hanna Skandera
- James Q. Wilson (Medal of Freedom Winner)

== Notable alumni ==
- Hanna Skandera (MPP '00), President, Daniels Fund. Former Secretary of Education, State of New Mexico
- Hans Zeiger (MPP '09), President, Jack Miller Center. Former State Senator for the State of Washington, is an alumnus of the school
