= Heinz College =

Public policy school of Carnegie Mellon University

Coordinates: 40.443504°N 79.941571°W

Heinz College of Information Systems and Public Policy
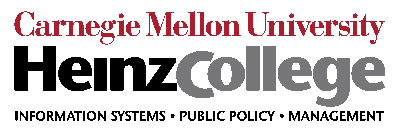
- Former names: School of Urban and Public Affairs (1968-1992); H. John Heinz III School of Public Policy and Management (1992-2008)
- Type: Private graduate college
- Established: 1968
- Parent institution: Carnegie Mellon University
- Dean: Kristen Martin
- Academic staff: 74
- Postgraduates: 1,518
- Doctoral students: 48
- Location: Pittsburgh, Pennsylvania, U.S.
- Campus: National Historic Landmark, Urban
- Website: heinz.cmu.edu

The Heinz College of Information Systems and Public Policy, also known as Heinz College, is the public policy and information college of Carnegie Mellon University in Pittsburgh, Pennsylvania, United States. It consists of the School of Information Systems and Management and the School of Public Policy and Management. The college is named after CMU's former instructor and the later U.S. Senator John Heinz from Pennsylvania.

The Heinz College educational process integrates policy analysis, management, and information technology. Coursework emphasizes the applied and interdisciplinary fields of empirical methods and statistics, economics, information systems and technology, operations research, and organizational behavior. In addition to full-time, on campus programs in Pittsburgh, Washington, DC, Los Angeles, and Adelaide, the Heinz College offers graduate-level programs to non-traditional students through part-time on-campus and distance programs, customized programs, and executive education programs for senior managers.

== History ==
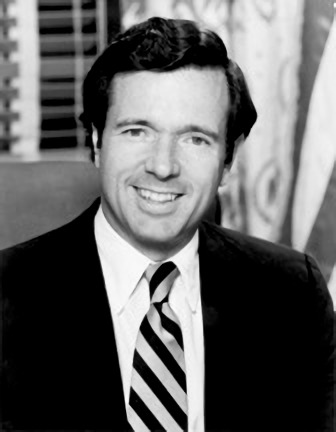
John Heinz, namesake of the Heinz College

Richard King Mellon and his wife Constance had long been interested in urban and social issues. In 1965, they sponsored a conference on urban problems, in which they began discussions with the University of Pittsburgh and Carnegie Mellon University to create a school focused on public affairs. In 1967, Carnegie Mellon President H. Guyford Stever, Richard M. Cyert, Dean of the Tepper School of Business, and Professors William W. Cooper and Otto Davis met and formed a university-wide committee to discuss creating a school that would train leaders to address complex problems in American urban communities. Davis was asked to draft a proposal to create such a school and focused on applying the Tepper School of Business' pioneering quantitative and skill-based approach to management education as well as technology to public sector problems.

In 1968, William Cooper and Otto Davis presented the final proposal for the School of Urban and Public Affairs (SUPA) to the Richard King Mellon Foundation. The proposal found favor with R. K. Mellon and he became strongly committed to creating such a school. The R. K. Mellon Foundation sent a proposal to President Stever to finance it with an initial grant of $10 million, and on 1 November 1968, President Stever created the School of Urban and Public Affairs with William Cooper as the first dean. The school initially drew much of its faculty from the Tepper School of Business and was based in the Margaret Morrison Carnegie Hall. Eventually, the school became independent of other colleges within the university and moved to its current location in historic Hamburg Hall when the facility was acquired by the university from the U.S. Bureau of Mines. Subsequent Deans include Otto Davis, Brian Berry, Joel A. Tarr, Alfred Blumstein, former Carnegie Mellon Provost Mark Kamlet, Linda C. Babcock, Jeffrey Hunker, Mark Wessel, Ramayya Krishnan and current Dean Kristen Martin.

In 1992, Teresa Heinz donated a large sum of money to the school, which was then renamed as the H. John Heinz III School of Public Policy and Management in honor of Mrs. Heinz's late husband, Senator H. John Heinz III. Senator Heinz, heir to the H. J. Heinz Company fortune, had been killed when his small private plane crashed one year before.

In 2007, the Heinz School received a grant from the Heinz Foundations that transformed the school into a college and formalized the School of Information Systems & Management alongside the School of Public Policy & Management under the college's administration. The official launch of the H. John Heinz III College of Information Systems and Public Policy was held on October 24, 2008 during Carnegie Mellon's Homecoming weekend and was led by Dean Krishnan, Teresa Heinz, and former United States Secretary of the Treasury Paul O'Neill.

== Facilities ==
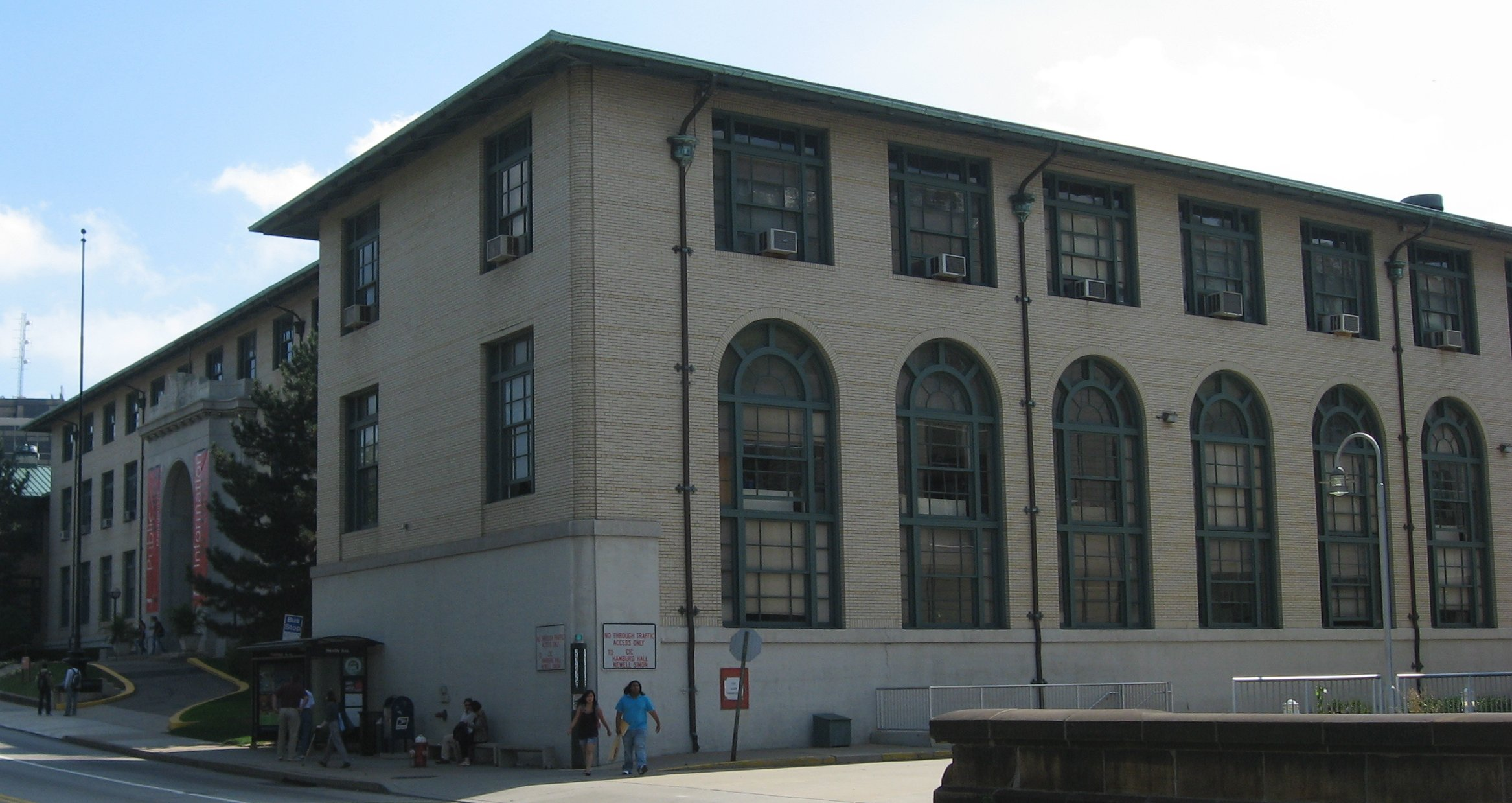
Hamburg Hall, home of the Heinz College

Heinz College is headquartered in Hamburg Hall, a building listed on the National Register of Historic Places and designed by noted Beaux-Arts architect Henry Hornbostel. Hamburg Hall is named for Lester A. Hamburg, an industrialist and philanthropist active in the Pittsburgh Jewish Community. The Heinz College also has a branch campus in Adelaide, South Australia, which offers master's degrees in Public Policy and Management and Information Technology. Heinz College also maintains a North Hollywood center in Los Angeles as part of the jointly administered master's degree program in Entertainment Industry Management, and a center in Washington, DC on Capitol Hill for students in the Public Policy and Management masters program.

Carnegie Mellon is in the process of renovating and expanding the Heinz College's Pittsburgh facilities through a four-phased process across Forbes Avenue from the 2013-announced Tepper Quadrangle. The ultimate plan for Hamburg Hall is to capture new space – approximately 20,000 square feet – by enclosing the courtyard between the rotunda, the East and West Wings, and the adjacent Elliott Dunlap Smith Hall with a soaring glass roof structure. This new space will include a large, multi‐purpose Classroom of the Future, lounges, meeting/study space, and a café. Phase I of renovations and expansion of Hamburg Hall was entirely financed by Heinz College and was completed in September 2013. Heinz College students immediately benefited from convenient access to the new student services and computing services suites. The construction of new career services interview rooms provides up‐to‐date facilities for on‐campus recruiters.

A December 2013 gift from The Heinz Endowments combined with gift commitments from other donors enabled the Heinz College to expedite the final architectural design of Phase II elements, finalize necessary construction planning, commence renovations and expansion, and complete a structure that will add additional value to the college. A new 150-seat auditorium in the courtyard between Hamburg Hall and Smith Hall was constructed, and both levels of the rotunda were transformed into student study and lounge spaces as well as a grand entrance and lobby area, and renamed as the Teresa Heinz Rotunda. The new auditorium allows the college to host high-profile speakers. Further, the west wing of Hamburg Hall now consists of forward-looking classrooms in the space that was vacated by the Engineering Research Accelerator when it moved to the newly constructed Scott Hall. An additional entrance from Forbes Avenue was also constructed.

During Phase III the addition to Hamburg Hall, including a glass roof, end walls, café, and study space, will be constructed. Fire protection and elevator improvements will also be addressed as well as the addition of new classrooms (including designated executive education rooms). The addition of 20,000 square feet to Hamburg Hall will allow the Heinz College to continue to grow student enrollment. This phase is planned for completion by 2017.

The final phase, Phase IV, will renovate third-floor faculty and PhD offices and meeting spaces.

The new additions and renovations will be designed to achieve LEED Silver certification.

== Rankings ==
In the 2019 U.S. News & World Report Graduate School rankings, the Heinz College was ranked 14th among schools of public affairs. Of the 285 schools of public affairs across the nation that were surveyed for 2019, Heinz College ranked:

- 1st in Information and Technology Management
- 5th in Environmental Policy and Management
- 6th in Public Policy Analysis
- 14th in Urban Policy
- 16th in Health Policy and Management
- 19th in Social Policy
- 27th in Public Finance and Budgeting
- 32nd in Public Management and Leadership

Heinz College also ranked 2nd in the Faculty Scholarly Productivity Index listing for the top performing programs in public administration and 9th in the listing for the top performing programs in public policy.

The PhD program in Public Policy and Management at the Heinz College was ranked in the top 5 overall and in the top 3 in faculty research activity by the National Research Council in 2010.

The Medical Management program was ranked 4th by Modern Healthcare Magazine in the 2009 rankings of the top management graduate schools for physician executives.

InformationWeek named the Heinz College's Master in Information Systems Management with Business Intelligence & Data Analytics concentration as one of the top 20 in big data analytics.

The Heinz College was awarded the 2016 UPS George D. Smith Prize by the Institute for Operations Research and the Management Sciences (INFORMS). The Smith Prize recognizes the best academic departments and schools in analytics, management science, and operations research.

== Education ==
The Heinz College has the following schools:

- School of Public Policy & Management
  - Master of Science in Public Policy & Management (MSPPM; full-time). Tracks include:
    - Accelerated 3-Semester Track (full-time); geared at incoming students with 3 or more years of relevant experience
    - Data Analytics (MSPPM-DA; full-time); focuses on quantitative data analytics
    - Global (full-time); first year in Adelaide, Australia, second year in Pittsburgh, PA. (See Heinz College Australia)
    - Washington, D.C. (MSPPM-DC; full-time); first year in Pittsburgh, PA, second year in Washington, D.C. completing classes and an apprenticeship
  - Master of Science in Health Care Policy & Management (MSHCPM; full-time)
  - Master of Science in Health Care Analytics & Information Technology (Full-time)
  - Master of Public Management (Part-time)
  - Master of Medical Management (Part-time)
- School of Information Systems & Management
  - Bachelor of Science in Information Systems (jointly with the Dietrich College of Humanities and Social Sciences)
  - Master of Information System Management (MISM; full-time)
  - Master of Science in Information Security Policy & Management (Full-time)
  - Master of Science in Information Technology (Part-time)
- Joint degree programs with the Carnegie Mellon College of Fine Arts
  - Master of Arts Management (MAM; full-time)
  - Master of Entertainment Industry Management (MEIM; full-time)
- PhD programs:
  - Public Policy & Management
  - Information Systems & Management
  - Economics & Public Policy (jointly with the Tepper School of Business)
  - Statistics and Public Policy (jointly with Department of Statistics and Data Science)
  - Strategy, Entrepreneurship, & Technological Change (jointly with three other departments)
  - Technological Change & Entrepreneurship (Carnegie Mellon Portugal program)
  - Machine Learning & Public Policy (jointly with the Machine Learning Department)

== Notable associated people ==
- Nilofar Bakhtiar - Pakistani Senator and former Federal Minister for Tourism
- Linda C. Babcock - former Dean, behavioral economist, and expert on the gender pay gap
- Allen Biehler - former Secretary of the Pennsylvania Department of Transportation
- Keith Block - Co-CEO of Salesforce.com
- Alfred Blumstein - one of the world's top criminologists and operations researchers, winner of the 2007 Stockholm Prize in Criminology, member of the National Academy of Engineering, INFORMS Fellow and past president, director of the National Consortium on Violence Research
- Nik Bonaddio - founder of numberFire
- Kathleen Carley - computational sociologist and expert in dynamic network analysis
- Jonathan Caulkins - Operations researcher and drug policy expert, INFORMS fellow, founder of the Pittsburgh branch of the RAND Corporation
- Jack Chow - Public health expert, first Assistant Director-General of the World Health Organization on HIV/AIDS, Tuberculosis, and Malaria, Special Representative of the U.S. Secretary of State on Global HIV/AIDS and Deputy Assistant Secretary of State for Health and Science
- William W. Cooper - founding Dean of Heinz College and pioneer in management science and accounting, INFORMS Fellow and past president, John von Neumann Theory Prize winner, and member of the Accounting Hall of Fame
- John Patrick Crecine - former President of the Georgia Institute of Technology, former Dean of the Gerald R. Ford School of Public Policy, former Dean of the Dietrich College of Humanities and Social Sciences
- Carmen Yulín Cruz - current mayor of San Juan, Puerto Rico
- David Dausey - public health expert and consultant for the RAND Corporation
- Jon Delano - Money & Politics editor at KDKA-TV
- David Farber - co-creator of ARPANET and former Chief Technologist for the Federal Communications Commission (FCC)
- Stephen Fienberg - renowned statistician and member of the National Academy of Sciences
- Richard Florida - social economist, urban scientist, and creator of the Creative class concept
- Anthony Foxx - former United States Secretary of Transportation
- Rayid Ghani - Chief Scientist Obama for America campaign
- John Graham - Dean of the Indiana University School of Public and Environmental Affairs, former Dean of the Frederick S. Pardee RAND Graduate School, and former Administrator of the Office of Information and Regulatory Affairs
- Jendayi Frazer - US Assistant Secretary of State for African Affairs in the George W. Bush administration
- Sung Deuk Hahm - Dean of the Graduate School of Political Studies and Naun Chair Professor of Political Science and Law at Kyonggi University
- Melvin J. Hinich - expert in signal processing and statistics
- Jeffrey Hunker - expert in information security policy, advisor in the United States Department of Commerce, founding director of the Critical Infrastructure Assurance Office, Senior Director for Critical Infrastructure on the National Security Council
- Farnam Jahanian - President and former Provost of Carnegie Mellon University and former Director of the National Science Foundation Directorate for Computer and Information Science and Engineering
- Sydney Kamlager-Dove - United States Representative for California's 37th congressional district
- David Krackhardt - expert in organizational behavior and social network analysis
- Ramayya Krishnan - Former Dean and expert in management science and information technology, strategy, and policy, INFORMS Fellow and President-elect
- Yeh Kuang-shih - Minister of Transportation and Communication of Taiwan
- Susie Lee - United States Representative for Nevada's 3rd District
- Charles F. Manski, Economist and econometrician in the realm of rational choice theory, an innovator known for his work on partial identification.
- Dan J. Martin - Dean of the Carnegie Mellon College of Fine Arts
- J. Kevin McMahon - President and CEO of the Pittsburgh Cultural Trust
- David H. McCormick - former Under Secretary for International Affairs within the US Department of the Treasury and President of Bridgewater Associates
- Sarah E. Mendelson - former United States Ambassador to the United Nations Economic and Social Council
- Daniel S. Nagin - criminologist, winner of the 2014 Stockholm Prize in Criminology, and fellow of the American Academy of Political and Social Science
- Jairam Ramesh - elected member of the Indian Parliament and the Cabinet Minister for Rural Development
- Mark Roosevelt - President of Antioch College, Democratic candidate for Governor of Massachusetts, superintendent of the Pittsburgh Public Schools, and member of the Roosevelt family
- Denise M. Rousseau - expert in organizational behavior and the psychological contract
- Joe Sestak - United States Congressman from Pennsylvania from 2007 to 2011, former United States Navy Vice Admiral
- Peter M. Shane - Professor of Law and Public Policy specializing in administrative law and e-democracy, former Dean of the University of Pittsburgh School of Law
- Kiron Skinner - United States Department of State Director of Policy Planning, expert and author in international relations, Cold War policy, and fellow at the Hoover Institution
- Luke Skurman - founder of Niche
- Michael D. Smith - economist in information technology and pioneer in The Long Tail phenomenon
- Robert P. Strauss - economist and expert in public finance and tax policy
- Subra Suresh - Former president of Carnegie Mellon University and former Director of the National Science Foundation
- John Tarnoff - studio executive, film and interactive producer, and technology entrepreneur and former Head of Show Development at DreamWorks Animation
- Irene Tinagli - member of the European Parliament and former member of the Italian Parliament
- Paula Wagner - film executive and talent agent, former CEO at United Artists and Cruise/Wagner Productions
- Robert Wilburn - former president of the Carnegie Museums of Pittsburgh, Indiana University of Pennsylvania, and director of Heinz College in Washington, DC

== See also ==
- Heinz College Australia, Heinz College's branch campus in Adelaide, South Australia
