= Association of Arts Administration Educators =

The Association of Arts Administration Educators (AAAE) is a US based not-for-profit organization which was founded in 1975 in order to offer an arena for the advocacy and support for the training and improvement in standards of education for those working in arts administration.
