= Cleotilde Gonzalez =

Mexican-American scientist

- Other name: Coty Gonzalez
- Occupation: Professor
- Years active: 2000–Present
- Known for: Dynamic decision-making
- Awards: 2024 AAAS Fellow, Lifetime Fellow of the Cognitive Science Society (CSS) and Fellow of the Human Factors and Ergonomics Society (HFES)

Academic background
- Education: Texas Tech University (Ph.D, M.S.); Universidad de las Americas-Puebla (MBA, B.S.)
- Thesis: Animation in User-interface Design for Decision-making: A Research Framework and Empirical Analysis
- Doctoral advisor: George M. Kasper
- Other advisors: Mica Endsley, Patricia R. DeLucia, Peter H. Westfall

Academic work
- Discipline: Cognitive Science
- Sub-discipline: Human factors
- Institutions: Carnegie Mellon University
- Main interests: Dynamic decision-making, decisions from experience, instanced-based learning theory, cognitive modeling.
- Website: https://www.cmu.edu/dietrich/sds/ddmlab/cotyweb/

Cleotilde Gonzalez is a Full Professor, tenured in the Social and Decision Sciences Department. She is also the Research Co-Director of the National NSF AI Institute for Societal Decision Making (AI-SDM) and the founding director of the Dynamic decision-making laboratory at Carnegie Mellon University. Gonzalez is also affiliated with the Security and Privacy Institute (CyLab), the Center for Behavioral Decision Research (CBDR), the Human Computer Interaction Institute, the Center for Cognitive Brain Imaging, and the Center for Neural Basis of Cognition.

She is a 2024 Fellow of the American Association for the Advancement of Science (AAAS), a lifetime Fellow at the Human Factors and Ergonomics Society and the Cognitive Science Society. She a member of the Governing Board of the Cognitive Science Society (2019-2025). Her research work focuses on how people and machines make dynamic decisions in real-time environments, when individuals have to adapt to external changes and make decisions using their experience. With Christian Lebiere and others, Gonzalez developed a theory of decision from experience in dynamic environments, called Instance-Based Learning Theory (IBLT). IBLT has been used as the basis to develop multiple computational models applied to diverse domains including: cybersecurity, human-machine teaming, and deception.

== Cited works ==
Gonzalez' most cited works

1. Gonzalez, Cleotilde; Lerch, Javier F.; Lebiere, Christian (1 December 2003). "Instance-based learning in dynamic decision making". Cognitive Science. 27 (4): 591–635. doi:10.1207/s15516709cog2704_2.

2. Cronin, Matthew A.; Gonzalez, Cleotilde; Sterman, John D. (January 2009). "Why don't well-educated adults understand accumulation? A challenge to researchers, educators, and citizens" (PDF). Organizational Behavior and Human Decision Processes. 108 (1): 116–130. doi:10.1016/j.obhdp.2008.03.003.

3. Gonzalez, Cleotilde; Dana, Jason; Koshino, Hideya; Just, Marcel (February 2005). "The framing effect and risky decisions: Examining cognitive functions with fMRI". Journal of Economic Psychology. 26 (1): 1–20. doi:10.1016/j.joep.2004.08.004.
