= Linda C. Babcock =

American economist and academic

- Born: 1961 (age 64–65)
- Education: University of California, Irvine; University of Wisconsin–Madison
- Occupation: Academic
- Employer: Carnegie Mellon University
- Spouse: Mark Wessel
- Children: 1

Linda C. Babcock is an American academic. She is the James M. Walton Professor of Economics and former dean at Carnegie Mellon University's Heinz College, and is the former head of the Social and Decision Sciences department. She is also the founder and faculty director of the Program for Research and Outreach on Gender Equity in Society (PROGRESS).

== Background ==
Babcock earned her Bachelor of Arts degree in Economics from the University of California, Irvine and her Master of Arts and Doctor of Philosophy degrees in Economics from the University of Wisconsin–Madison. A visiting professor at the Graduate School of Business at the University of Chicago, the Harvard Business School, and the California Institute of Technology, she is also a member of the Behavioral Economics Roundtable coordinated by the Russell Sage Foundation. In addition, she has served on the economics review panel for the National Science Foundation.

Babcock's research concerns the wage gap and the perception that women are more reluctant than men to ask for salary increases.

== Works ==
- Babcock, Linda C.; Laschever, Sara (2007). Women Don't Ask: The High Cost of Avoiding Negotiation and Positive Strategies for Change. New York: Bantam Books. ISBN 9780553383874.
- Babcock, Linda C.; Laschever, Sara (2009). Ask for It: How Women Can Use the Power of Negotiation to Get What They Really Want. New York: Bantam Books. ISBN 9780553384550. OCLC 232129247.
