= Robert P. Strauss =

American economist

Robert Philip Strauss has been professor of economics and public policy at the H. John Heinz III College since 1979.

== Academic career ==
Robert P Strauss is a native of University Heights, Ohio where he attended the public schools. He graduated from Cleveland Heights High School, and subsequently attended and graduated from the Honors College of the University of Michigan, where he earned his AB in economics; he attended the London School of Economics his junior year abroad. He earned his PhD in economics from the University of Wisconsin at Madison, where he was a Fellow of the Institute for Research on Poverty, and a research assistant to Karl and Alma Taeuber as well as Burt Weisbrod and W. Lee Hansen. He received his PhD in 1970 with specializations in public finance and human resources. Prior to joining Carnegie Mellon, he was a member of the economics department at the University of North Carolina at Chapel Hill for 10 years where he was also an adjunct faculty member in the Bush Institute for Family Policy at the Frank Porter Graham Center. Strauss was a visiting professor at the University of Rochester Department of Economics in 1992–1994, and a visiting professor at the Department of Economics at Washington University in St. Louis, in the spring of 2014.

== Research ==
His research interests span federal, state, and local finance, and various aspects of the economics of education and econometric methodology. His current research includes the design of least regressive national consumption tax systems, the effects of safety net structures on the labor force participation of adults, the relationship between demography and the fisc, and the game theoretic characterization of the overloading of trucks on the public roads.

== Public service and awards ==
In addition to his scholarly activities, he has extensive public service experience at the US Treasury as a Brookings Economic Policy Fellow and assistant to the Deputy Secretary of the Treasury (1970–1972), at the Joint Committee on Taxation (1975–8), and a variety of state and local governments. He received the Treasury Department's Exceptional Service Award in 1972, presidential pens from President Richard Nixon in 1972 and President Gerald Ford in 1976, as well as awards from the Tax Executives Institute, and Southern Economic Association. In November 2005, he received the Steven D. Gold Award from the Association for Public Policy and Management, National Tax Association, and Federation of Tax Administrators for his contributions to state and local tax policy. In 2016, he was elected as a Fellow to the National Academy of Public Administration.
