= Daniel Nagin =

American criminologist and statistician

Daniel S. Nagin
- Born: November 29, 1948 (age 77)
- Education: Carnegie Mellon University
- Awards: 2014 Stockholm Prize in Criminology, 2006 Edwin H. Sutherland Award from the American Society of Criminology
- Scientific career
- Fields: Criminology, statistics
- Workplaces: Heinz College at Carnegie Mellon University
- Thesis: An Investigation into the Association Between Crime and Sanctions (1976)

Daniel S. Nagin (born November 29, 1948) is an American criminologist and statistician who is the Lester Hamburg University Professor of Public Policy and Statistics at Carnegie Mellon University's Heinz College. He is also a Max Planck Law Fellow, a position to which he was appointed in August 2021 by the Max Planck Society. He holds this position at the Max Planck Institute for the Study of Crime, Security and Law in Freiburg and the Max Planck Institute for Research on Collective Goods in Bonn. He was Heinz College's Associate Dean of Faculty from 2006 to 2026.

His research focuses on criminal behavior, deterrence, and statistical methods for longitudinal data analysis, particularly group-based trajectory modeling. He was elected to the National Academy of Sciences in 2025 and the American Academy of Arts and Sciences in 2023, and received the Stockholm Prize in Criminology in 2014.

== Education ==
In 1971, Nagin earned a B.S. in Administrative and Managerial Sciences and an M.S. in Industrial Administration from Carnegie Mellon University's Graduate School of Industrial Administration, now the Tepper School of Business. He received Ph.D. from what is now the university's Heinz College in 1976.

== Career ==
Nagin began his academic career in 1976 as an assistant professor of public policy at Duke University. After working at Cambridge Systematics from 1978 to 1979, he joined Carnegie Mellon University as an associate professor of public policy and operations research. From 1981 to 1986, he served as Deputy Secretary for Fiscal Policy and Analysis at the Pennsylvania Department of Revenue.

Nagin returned to Carnegie Mellon in 1986 as an associate professor of management and became a full professor in 1990. He was appointed the Teresa and H. John Heinz III Professor of Public Policy and Statistics in 1999 and received the rank of University Professor in 2008. In 2024, he became the Lester Hamburg University Professor of Public Policy and Statistics.

He directed a research program of the National Consortium on Violence Research at Carnegie Mellon from 1997 to 2003 and held visiting appointments at the University of Cambridge and Russell Sage Foundation. He served as president of the American Society of Criminology in 2021.

== Research ==
Nagin's research focuses on criminal deterrence, patterns of criminal behavior over the life course, and statistical methods for longitudinal data analysis. He chaired the National Research Council's Committee on Deterrence and the Death Penalty, whose 2012 report concluded that existing research was insufficient to determine whether capital punishment deters crime.

Nagin also developed group-based trajectory modeling, a statistical method used to identify patterns of behavioral development over time. Introduced in a 1999 article and further developed in his 2005 book Group-Based Modeling of Development, the method has been applied in criminology, psychology, and medical research. Subsequent work extended its applications to multiple behavioral trajectories and related statistical analyses.

== Honors and awards ==
- Member, National Academy of Sciences (2025)
- August Vollmer Award, American Society of Criminology (2025)
- Member, American Academy of Arts and Sciences (2023)
- Research.com Social Science and Humanities Leader Award (2023)
- Max Planck Law Fellow (2021)
- National Academy of Sciences Award for Scientific Reviewing (2017)
- Carnegie Mellon University Alumni Distinguished Achievement Award (2016)
- Stockholm Prize in Criminology (2014), shared with Joan Petersilia
- Fellow, American Academy of Political and Social Science (2014)
- National Associate of the National Research Council (2011)
- Edwin H. Sutherland Award, American Society of Criminology (2006)
- Life Member, Clare Hall College, University of Cambridge (2003)
- Fellow, American Association for the Advancement of Science (2002)
- Fellow, American Society of Criminology (1999)
