= Arts administration =

Field in the arts sector

Arts administration (alternatively arts management) is a field in the arts sector that facilitates programming within cultural organizations. Arts administrators manage the daily operations of cultural organizations and help plan their long-term goals, including their mission and vision. Arts management became present in the arts and culture sector in the 1960s. Organizations include professional non-profit (referred to as not-for-profit in Canada) entities. For examples, theaters, museums, symphony orchestras, concert bands, jazz organizations, opera houses, ballet companies and many smaller professional and non-professional for-profit arts-related organizations (e.g. auction houses, art galleries, music companies, etc.). The duties of an arts administrator can include staff management, marketing, budget management, public relations, fundraising, program development evaluation, community engagement, strategic planning, and board relations.

== Duties and roles of arts administrators ==
Art administrators (alternatively arts managers) work for arts and cultural organizations such as theatres, symphonies, art galleries, museums, arts centers, regional art councils, and heritage buildings. Employers of arts administrators may be for-profit organizations, not-for-profit organizations or government agencies.

Arts Administrators take on a variety of job duties which include developing budgets, planning events and performances, negotiating contracts and developing community interest in the arts organization. An arts administrator often directs the hiring and training of personnel, devises their schedules and task assignments. Those employed by non-profit organizations are in charge of organizing fund-raising events and enlisting financial supporters. Additionally, arts administrators are expected to conduct grant research, apply for grants and disburse acquired funding so that programming can continue.

An arts administrator employed by a small organization can be responsible for marketing events, event booking, and managing project budgets. An arts administrator employed by a larger arts organization may be responsible for buildings and facilities, creative staff (e.g., performers/artists/art directors), administrative staff, public relations, marketing, writing proposals and reports.

A senior-level arts administrator may advise the board of directors or other senior managers on strategic planning and management decisions. An effective arts administrator must also be knowledgeable in local, state and federal public policy as it relates to human resources, health insurance, labor laws and volunteer risk management.

Arts administrators have the ability to create and administer necessary professional development to fine arts teachers as well. Professional development for the arts is often subpar due to a lack in finances from the government's allotted funding, which can be remedied by the lobbying of arts administrators.

== Advocacy in arts administration ==
Like any business, arts organizations must work within changing external and internal environments. External changes may be cultural, social, demographic, economic, political, or technological. Internal changes may be related to the audience, membership, board of directors, personnel, facilities, or overall growth. Another change that must be taken into consideration is the need for technology-based marketing programs (i.e.: social media) in order for the organization to change with the times and bring younger visitor and member pools into the organization. In fact, social media presence is a great path for administrators to grow community through multiple online platforms at the company they work for.

Although a good arts administrator monitors and manages change, they must also remain attentive to the organization's overall direction and climate while supporting staff in their day-to-day responsibilities. Arts organizations, as part of the broader economic system, are affected by periods of expansion and contraction at the local, regional, national, and global levels. During challenging economic conditions, many arts organizations face significant pressure. In response, the Association of Arts Administration Educators (AAAE) and its membership have shown increased interest in addressing key issues in the arts and in providing support to organizations in areas such as management, policy, governance, fundraising, and finance. This growing engagement has contributed to an expansion in both the quantity and quality of research within the field.

The history of Advocacy for the arts in Canada is largely represented by the Canadian Artists' Representation/Le Front des Artistes Canadiens (CARFAC). It is a non-profit corporation that serves as the national voice of Canada's professional visual artists. The organization's active involvement in advocacy, lobbying, research and public education on behalf of artists in Canada has defined CARFAC as an integral representative body for artists across Canada. In 1975 CARFAC was successful in lobbying for exhibition fees for artists. As a result the Canada Council made the payment of fees to living Canadian artists a requirement for eligibility for Program Assistance Grants to Public Art Galleries. CARFAC’s advocacy for artists resulted in the creation of the federal Copyright Act amendment in 1988. The Act recognizes artists as the primary producers of culture, and gives artists legal entitlement to exhibition and other fees. Arts Administrators throughout Canada actively refer to CARFAC's artist fee requirements when hiring professional artists.

== Government funding and granting bodies ==
Each country has their own models and agencies to fund the arts. In Canada the arts are funded by the Canadian government through the Department of Canadian Heritage. Each province has a ministry that funds arts and culture. Depending on the governmental party in power, the amount of funds available for the arts and culture vary. In Ontario, the Ministry that funds the arts is the Ministry of Heritage, Sport, Tourism and Culture Industries.

In Canada there are federal, provincial and municipal granting bodies that fund the arts. These granting bodies are arms-length funding agencies, meaning they work separately from the government. Canada Council for the Arts, a federal granting body, was created in 1957 and it fulfilled the requirements of the Massey Commission. Canada Council for the Arts funds artists, collectives and arts organizations from all provinces and territories in Canada. CCA funds circus arts, dance, deaf and disability arts, digital arts, indigenous arts, inter-arts, literature, media arts, multidisciplinary activities, music and sound, theatre, visual arts and other discipline arts. In 2018-19, CCA granted $246.1M to the arts in Canada. In Ontario, the Ontario Arts Council provides grants to Ontario-based individual artists and arts professionals, ad hoc groups/collectives and organizations. The OAC provides two types of grants which are project grants (one-time grants for specific projects, available to individual artists, ad hoc groups/collectives and organizations) and operating grants (ongoing support for Ontario-based, not-for-profit arts organizations and for-profit book and magazine publishers).

The United States arts system has a variety of government subsidies composing roughly 7 percent of the nation’s total investment in not-for-profit arts groups. The National Endowment for the Arts is an independent federal agency that was created in 1965 in the United States of America. The NEA’s role is to make sure all Americans have access to the arts no matter where they live. The NEA’s funding is project-based and goes to thousands of nonprofits each year, along with partnerships and special arts initiatives, research and other support that contribute to the vitality of neighborhoods, students and schools, workplace and culture.

The United States also has State/Regional Arts Agencies. The State/Regional Arts Agencies are funded through the NEA since they are required to apportion funds to any state that has an art agency. Local Arts Agencies function as councils or commissions, or as city departments, and are funded by various sources: the NEA; state arts agencies, municipal budgets, and private donations.

The arts in the United Kingdom is funded through the Department for Digital, Culture, Media and Sport which is a department of the United Kingdom government. The DCMS is supported by 45 agencies and public bodies. In England, the Arts Council England is a non-departmental public body of the Department for Digital, Culture, Media and Sport.

In the United Kingdom there is a charity called Art Fund. For over 110 years they have supported museums and galleries, and have helped them buy and display great works of art for everyone to enjoy. Art Fund has funding for acquisitions, training and development, and tours and exhibitions. Art Fund also advocates and campaigns for important causes like the free entry to national museums in the UK, and more recently for tax incentives to encourage philanthropy.
