= Hanna Skandera =

American politician

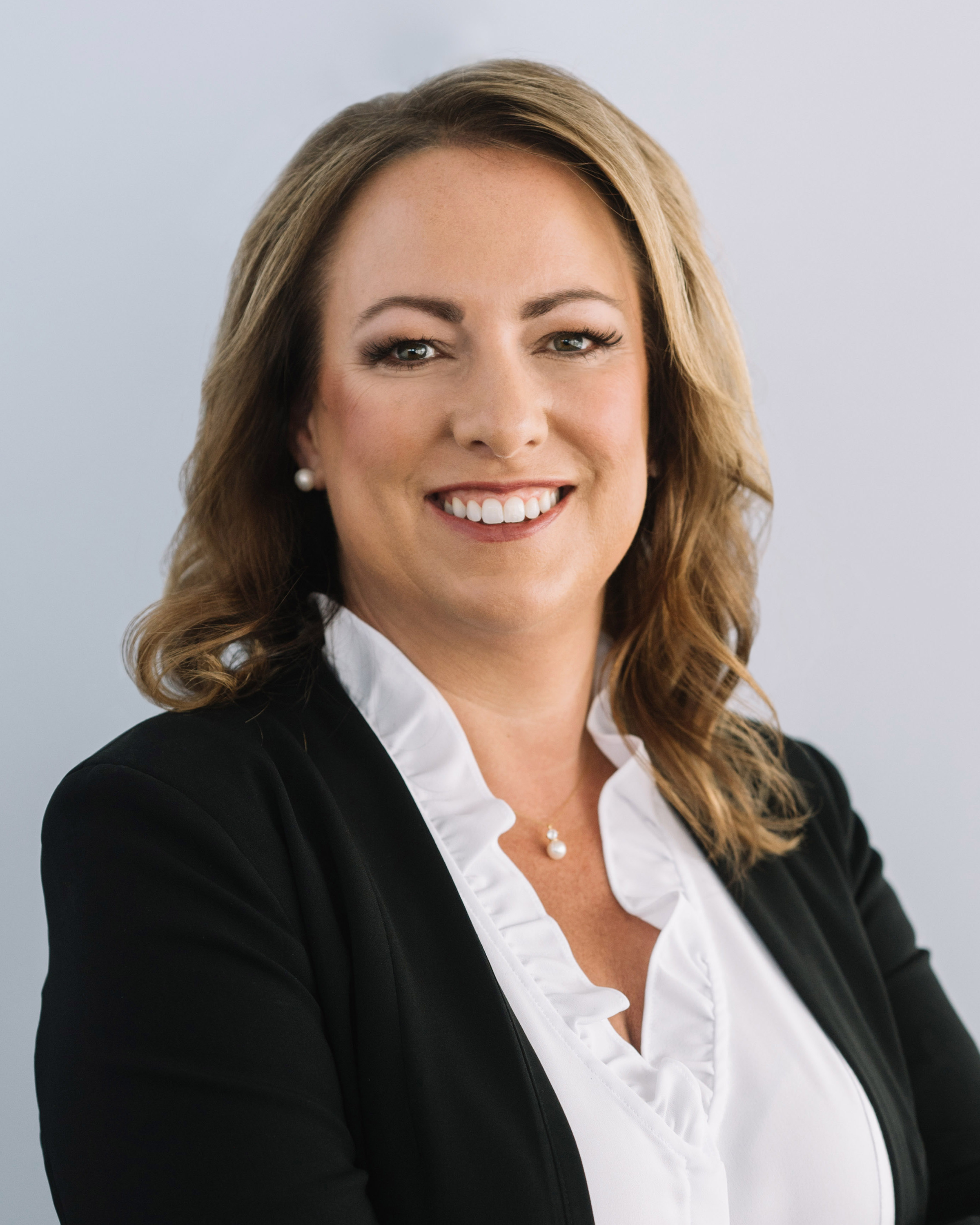

Secretary of Education of New Mexico
- In office December 22, 2010 – June 20, 2017
- Governor: Susana Martinez

Personal details
- Party: Republican
- Education: Pepperdine University

Hanna Skandera is an American nonprofit executive and former government official. She was the Secretary of Education of New Mexico from 2010 to 2017. Since 2020, Skandera has served as the president and CEO of the Daniels Fund, a Colorado-based grant making foundation founded by Bill Daniels.

She is a former Deputy Education Commissioner of Florida. After President-elect Donald Trump announced his intention to nominate Betsy DeVos as United States Secretary of Education in November 2016, Skandera was mentioned as a possible candidate for deputy secretary or under secretary in the Department of Education.

On June 8, 2017, Skandera announced that she was stepping down as New Mexico Secretary of Education, effective June 20.
