= Carnegie Mellon College of Engineering =

College in Carnegie Mellon University

Coordinates: 40°26′32″N 79°56′47.1″W

Carnegie Mellon University College of Engineering
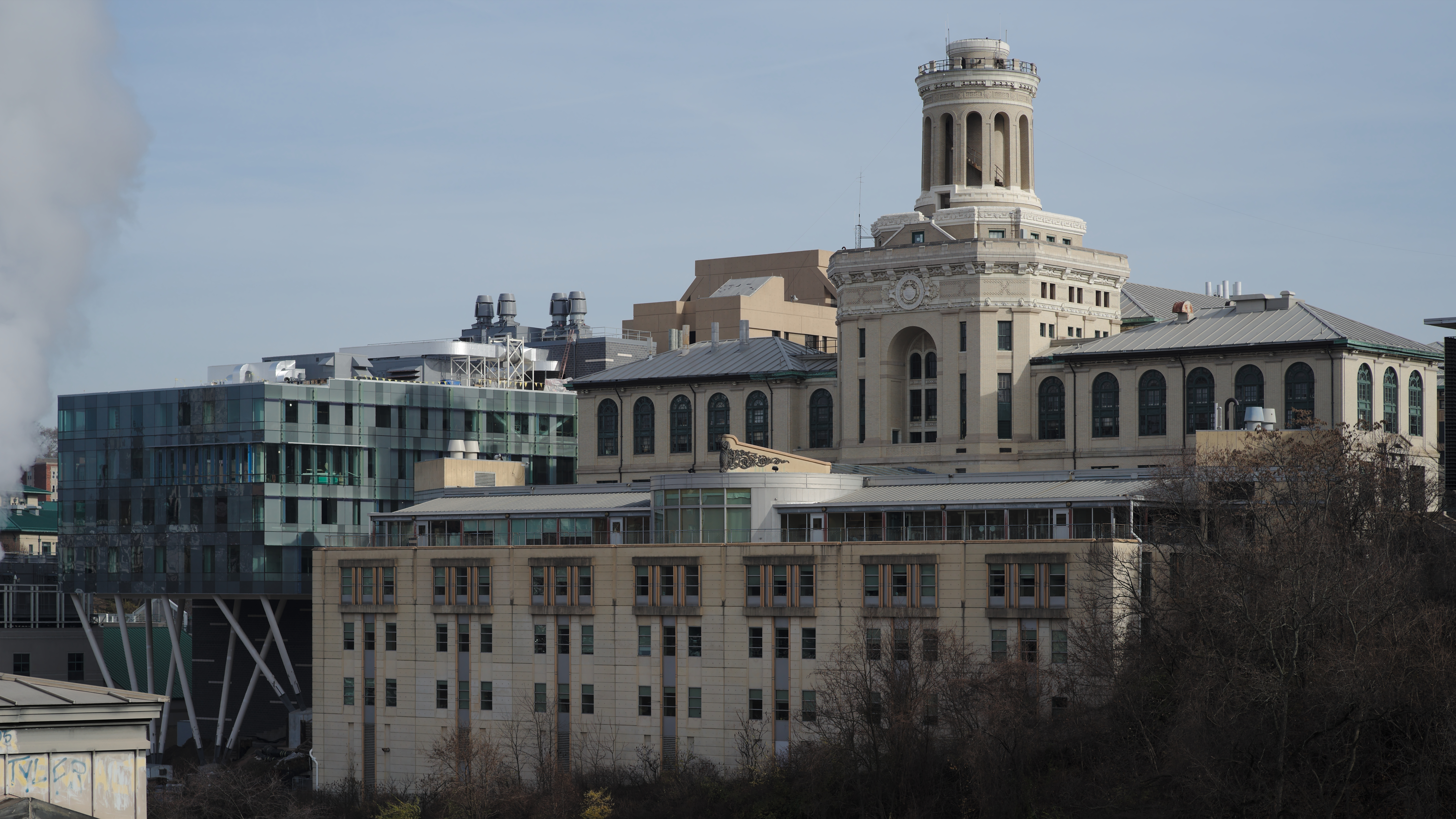
- Hamerschlag, Roberts, and Scott Halls are three major facilities of the College of Engineering
- Former name: Carnegie Institute of Technology
- Type: Private engineering school
- Established: 1905 by Andrew Carnegie
- Dean: Vijayakumar Bhagavatula
- Undergraduates: 1,808
- Postgraduates: 1,411
- Doctoral students: 718
- Location: 5000 Forbes Avenue, Pittsburgh, Pennsylvania, U.S.
- Campus: Urban
- Website: engineering.cmu.edu

The Carnegie Mellon University College of Engineering (formerly known as the Carnegie Institute of Technology) is the academic unit that manages engineering research and education at Carnegie Mellon University. The College can trace its origins from Andrew Carnegie's founding of the Carnegie Technical Schools. Today, The College of Engineering has seven departments of study.

== History ==
By 1905, the massive buildings of the Carnegie Technical Schools were being constructed in a field east of the University of Pittsburgh. The first students of the School of Science and Technology began classes in unfinished buildings, still surrounded by new construction. The school initially offered two- and three-year programs to train the children of Pittsburgh's working class. After the merger between Carnegie Tech and the Mellon Institute of Industrial Research, the newly formed Carnegie Mellon University's College of Engineering and Science was divided into the Carnegie Institute of Technology (engineering) and the Mellon College of Science. Subsequently, the Carnegie Institute of Technology was re-branded as the College of Engineering. The Department of Mechanical Engineering was organized by professor Willibald Trinks who thereafter headed it for 38 years.

== About ==
Enrollment for or the 2017–2018 academic year was 1,783 full-time undergraduate, 1,383 master's, and 703 doctoral students. The college employs 207 faculty members whose research is recognized and supported by such sources as the National Science Foundation, the National Institutes of Health, Defense Advanced Research Projects Agency, and the Environmental Protection Agency. As part of Carnegie Mellon University, the College of Engineering works to carry out the university's mission of “changing the needs of society by building on its traditions of innovation, problem-solving and interdisciplinarity”.

The College's Office of the Dean is housed in Scaife Hall, and the college's primary facilities include Hamerschlag Hall, Roberts Engineering Hall, Doherty Hall, and Scott Hall, in addition to Scaife.

=== Engineering and Public Policy ===
The Department of Engineering and Public Policy, informally known as "EPP", is a pioneering, interdisciplinary academic department within the Carnegie Mellon University College of Engineering. EPP combines technical analysis with social science and policy analysis, in order to address problems in which knowledge of technical details is critical to decision making. The primary purpose of the EPP program is to educate students to work at the interface of the social and engineering sciences, through use of an interdisciplinary curriculum based equally on social analysis and engineering analysis. EPP offers a double-major undergraduate degree, multiple masters degree programs, and a doctoral studies program. Undergraduate students receive a Bachelor of Science degree from one of the traditional engineering departments plus EPP.

EPP works in a variety of research areas on problems that involve the interaction of technology with society. These include:

1. Energy and environment (including climate);
2. Risk analysis and communication;
3. Information and communication technology policy;
4. Management of technical innovation and R&D policy.

Across these four focal areas, the department addresses issues in technology and organizations, and in technology and economic development, focusing in particular on India and China. EPP also develops new software tools for the support of policy analysis and research, and studies issues in engineered systems and security.
