= Scotch'n'Soda Theatre =

Student-run theatre organization

Coordinates: 40°26′36″N 79°56′30″W

- Founded: 1937
- Type: 501(c)(3)
- Location: Carnegie Mellon University
- Origins: The White Friars Club
- Region served: Pittsburgh
- Key people: Board Of Directors
- Website: Scotch'n'Soda Theatre

Scotch'n'Soda is a student-run theatre organization at Carnegie Mellon University. Its initial dedication was the creation and production of original musicals, but has now taken to performing both professionally published and student-written materials. Students are welcome to write, compose, design, direct, perform in, and otherwise become involved with every aspect of each production. The organization is open to all Carnegie Mellon students from all backgrounds who are interested, and all performances are public with varying ticket prices.

== History ==
Scotch'n'Soda Theatre is the nation's oldest coed student theater group, and is one of the oldest and largest student organizations at Carnegie Mellon University. It was founded in the fall of 1907 as The White Friars Club, providing a theatrical outlet for the students of the Carnegie Technical Schools. Their first production, in the spring of 1908, was entitled All in a Dormitory and gave a comical look at life on campus. The club would grow in only three years to have a membership of 78 in 1910; it had its first financially successful year in 1911. The White Friars Club was short-lived, as student theater went on hiatus during World War I. It wasn't until 1932, when a student theater group called The Bacchanalians formed to produce a musical for Carnegie Tech's Spring Carnival.

The organization took its current name in 1937 during a vote by the membership. The newly named student-run theater troupe began producing original full-length musicals for Spring Carnival. With the exception of a five-year break from 1942 to 1946 for World War II, Scotch'n'Soda has been producing musicals for Carnival continuously to the present.

In the 1960s, Scotch'n'Soda began expanding its season by producing shows for Homecoming. While then still heavily populated by drama majors, S'n'S provided a theatrical outlet to students of all disciplines and encouraged collaboration on original works. Perhaps the most notable of these original works from the '60s was the musical Pippin, Pippin by drama student Stephen Schwartz, produced for Carnival 1967. This show was produced on Broadway just five years later under the shortened title Pippin, and was directed and choreographed by the famed Bob Fosse.

Scotch'n'Soda continued to grow in the 1970s, winning a BMI award for Outstanding Variety Show in 1970 for Something Personal by David Sheridan Spangler and Mark Pirolo and again in 1972 and 1973 for A New Day and Lord Have Mercy, both by Stephen M. Fechtor. However, in a major blow to the membership, the School of Drama forbade acting majors from participating in Scotch'n'Soda productions in 1976. Despite losing the core of the membership, the remaining members of the club decided to press on with completely student-run, non-major theater.

Not satisfied with only doing musicals for Homecoming and Carnival, Scotch'n'Soda introduced the campus's first long-form improv production in 1988. This began a 20-year period of growth and change for the organization. In the early 1990s, they expanded to a three-production season. In 1993, a subsidiary group that existed for one year called Club Soda formed, which taught new skills to the diverse membership. This led to more submissions of both student and professionally written plays, and in 1994, the theater company began regular theater "seasons" of three shows plus the Spring Carnival Musical. In 1996, another subsidiary troupe formed, The No Parking Players, Carnegie Mellon's first improv-comedy group. In 1998, Scotch'n'Soda expanded to a permanent five-production season.

Today, Scotch'n'Soda produces various shows each season performing in a variety of spaces in the University Center and elsewhere on campus. With a membership spanning all six of Carnegie Mellon's undergraduate colleges, Scotch'n'Soda continues to grow on campus to this day.

== Board of Directors ==
Scotch'n'Soda is governed by a board of nine directors . Each position of the board is elected annually by the general membership. These positions (along with the students who currently occupy them) include:

- President (Emily Manack)
- Artistic Director (Anabella Chyan)
- Vice President (Vacant)
- Managing Director (Rebecca Hodge)
- Technical Coordinator (Kira Lentz)
- Public Relations Coordinator (Vacant)
- Secretary (Zoë Painter)
- General Membership Coordinator (Leila Topi)
- Executive Board Member (Jacob Ellis)

These nine students work to contribute and act as executive producers to each production. They hold open weekly meetings to discuss all issues related to the organization and hold responsibility for selecting material for productions. They are assisted by auxiliary board members who handle various facets of the organization and liaisons to the subsidiary troupes within the organization. All auxiliary board members are represented at board meetings by the vice president.

== Show process ==
=== Selection of material ===
Scotch'n'Soda welcomes scripts presented from any student on Carnegie Mellon's campus, though they do not have to be student-written. Playwrights who are not Carnegie Mellon students may submit their own material as long as it is submitted through a current CMU student. All scripts must be approved by the board, who examine each script and approve those that appeal to the community and membership, and are technically feasible. After scripts are approved, all Carnegie Mellon students are welcome to submit a director's proposal to the Scotch'n'Soda board. In a publicly held meeting, directors present their proposals to the board. The meeting is then closed to the public as the board selects a specific show for production. Several weeks into production, a board preview performance is held, which includes an open rehearsal of the show, as well as reports from all members of the technical staff on the production. It is at this board preview that final approval must be given to a show before it may begin performances.

=== Funding ===
Scotch'n'Soda is funded by a specific allocation of a student activities fee paid by all students and distributed by Carnegie Mellon's Joint Funding Committee. Scotch'n'Soda does not profit from its productions, nor does any member receive payment for services.

=== Venues ===
Originally, Scotch'n'Soda presented all its performances in Pittsburgh's Carnegie Music Hall, located less than one mile from the school's campus. Eventually, due to rental fees and time commitments, Scotch'n'Soda had to leave the large performance hall and was transplanted into the Carnegie Mellon gym. This was soon followed by a move into a specially constructed stage in Skibo Ballroom, part of the Skibo University Center on Carnegie Mellon's campus. In the summer of 1994, the building was torn down to make room for the school's current University Center. During the two years of construction, Scotch'n'Soda had no home and performed in various lecture halls, the drill deck of the old student center, and off campus at Rodef Shalom Congregation.

Upon the completion of CMU's University Center, Scotch'n'Soda has been rotating performance spaces throughout the building. This has proven difficult for the organization to this day, as access to the performance spaces is very limited, and in most cases they can only use each performance space for a maximum of seven consecutive days (Spring Carnival performances in 1997–99 were able to reserve Rangos Hall for two weeks). This limited amount of time includes load-in, rehearsals, performances and strike. In fact, unable to find a suitable venue, the May 2001 production of Edward Albee's The Zoo Story was performed outside in the Highlander Compass.

Some other venues have been used in recent years, including various locations in Porter Hall and the Helen Wayne Rauh Studio Theatre (in the Purnell Center). As of fall 2016, most performances are held in the Cohon University Center's blackbox studio theater.

== Subtroupes ==
=== The No Parking Players ===
No Parking Players Improv

Founded in 1996, the No Parking Players is Scotch'n'Soda Theatre's improv troupe. NPP practices improvised theatre of all kinds, with a focus on long-form comedy. At the core of the NPP experience are the weekly workshops on Wednesdays and Sundays, open to the entire campus community. People of all experience levels are welcome, including those who have never tried improv before. Most workshops are composed of regulars and newcomers side by side. The No Parking Players performance group also has regular shows roughly twice a month, with the improvisers performing long-form improv such as Harolds and Armandos. In 2009, the troupe began offering a class on comedic improv for free-elective credit via Carnegie Mellon's Student College. In 2018, the troupe began an annual improv comedy festival named DETOUR that brought together both college and professional improv troupes from Pittsburgh and other locations to perform on the CMU campus.

=== Tisbert Sketch Comedy ===
Tisbert sketch comedy

Founded during the 2011–12 academic year, Tisbert is Scotch'n'Soda's sketch comedy troupe. Composed entirely of student-written sketches, Tisbert presents one show per semester for a total of two shows per academic calendar; the troupe is known for employing multiple forms of media, such as video, in their sketches. Acting roles for Tisbert performances are audition-only and open to any member of the Carnegie Mellon community. Writers' meetings are also open to the Carnegie Mellon community and are not subject to any audition process. A subsection of Tisbert is the Tistroupe, an auditioned group of writers and actors that act as their own performance troupe within Tisbert; they put on an additional show every semester, written and acted by Tistroupe members only. The troupe does not reveal what "Tisbert" means to non-members, and the mystery is evident by the question mark in their logo. In 2018, the troupe began offering a class on writing and performing sketch comedy for free elective credit via Carnegie Mellon's Student College, however the course is not currently offered. The organization's artistic director, head writer, secretary, community coordinator, and show coordinator serve as the administrative board, known as the Tisboard.

=== New Works Coffeehouse ===
The NewWorks Coffeehouse logo

Previously simply called "Workshopping", the New Works Coffeehouse embraces the ideals of the early years of Scotch'n'Soda, facilitating the creation of new original works by its members. The subtroupe provides members with the tools they need to get from idea to script, and hosts readings, stagings, and productions of work by current and former members of Scotch'n'Soda. It accepts submissions of all forms of writing for either workshopping or production services; these services are open to all students who are a part of the Carnegie Mellon Community, regardless of department.

=== Alumni Clan ===
Scotch'n'Soda is currently developing an Alumni Clan, which is devoted to keeping all past members of the organization in touch and organizing reunion events. It also presents the Buzz Blair Award for the Performing Arts, named after founding member Leonard "Buzz" Blair, and given annually during Carnegie Mellon's homecoming festivities.

== Notable alumni ==
Numerous renowned figures in the performing arts started with Scotch'n'Soda. Some of the most acclaimed are John-Michael Tebelak, author of Godspell; Roger O. Hirson, author of Pippin; and Stephen Schwartz, author of Wicked. Other performing arts alumni include:

- Jerry Adler — director/film actor
- Lawrence Carra — professor
- Iris Rainer Dart — novelist
- William Eythe — actor
- Barbara Feldon — actress/model
- Bob Finkel — director/producer
- Herb Gardner — artist/playwright
- Frank Gorshin — actor/comedian
- Javier Grillo-Marxuach — emmy-winning TV producer & writer
- Franklin Heller — TV director
- Bill McDonald (actor) — actor
- William H. Putch — director
- Alex Segal — Emmy-winning TV director & producer
- Saul Swimmer — director/producer
- Michael Patrick Walker — composer/lyricist

== See also ==
- Carnegie Mellon
- Pippin (musical)
