= Pittsburgh Life Sciences Greenhouse =

Life sciences investment firm

Pittsburgh Life Sciences Greenhouse (PLSG) is an investment firm based in the South Side neighborhood of Pittsburgh, Pennsylvania that provides resources and tools to entrepreneurial life sciences enterprises in Pittsburgh and western Pennsylvania in order to advance research and patient care.

== History ==
Since PLSG began operations in 2002, it has assisted more than 435 life sciences companies and has affected more than 10,000 jobs in western Pennsylvania. PLSG has provided 34 companies with office or laboratory space, and 14 have been relocated to Pittsburgh from outside the region. PLSG has invested over $20 million in 77 companies, which has leveraged over $1.5 billion in additional capital to the region.

PLSG guides researchers, entrepreneurs and emerging companies through the challenges faced in early stages of company development. They provide support to companies developing product and service innovations in biotechnology tools, diagnostics/screening, healthcare IT, medical devices and therapeutics. PLSG also helps in the expansion of more mature life science companies, by supporting new product and market developments and connecting them to investors.

Pittsburgh Life Sciences Greenhouse grew out of an original plan known as BioVenture, developed by CMU and Pitt. The initiative received a major boost in 2001 when money from the state's settlement with the tobacco industry was pledged to create a life science greenhouse in Western Pennsylvania. In 2003, Pittsburgh Biomedical Corporation, a non-profit established in 1988 by the Pittsburgh Technology Council, consolidated with PLSG.

Today, PLSG exists as a partnership between the Commonwealth of Pennsylvania, University of Pittsburgh, Carnegie Mellon University, University of Pittsburgh Medical Center and the regional foundation of community. Their mission is to "create, nurture and help establish a globally dominant life sciences industry in western Pennsylvania."
