= Information Networking Institute =

- Other name: INI
- Established: 1989
- Academic affiliations: College of Engineering, Carnegie Mellon University
- Director: Dena Haritos Tsamitis
- Students: 260
- Location: 4616 Henry Street, Pittsburgh, Pennsylvania, U.S. 40.44608°N 79.94805°W
- Campus: Urban
- Nickname: The Tartans
- Mascot: Scottish terrier "Scotty"
- Website: cmu.edu/ini

Information Networking Institute (INI) is an academic department within the College of Engineering at Carnegie Mellon University. The institute was established in 1989 as the nation's first research and education center devoted to information networking.

The INI also partners with research and outreach entities to extend educational and training programs to a broad audience of people using information networking as part of their daily lives. The INI is the educational partner of Carnegie Mellon CyLab, a university-wide, multidisciplinary research center involving more than 50 faculty and 100 graduate students.

== Center of Academic Excellence Designations ==
Through the work of the INI and CyLab, Carnegie Mellon University has been designated by the National Security Agency and the Department of Homeland Security as a National Center of Academic Excellence in Information Assurance/Cyber Defense Education (CAE-IA/CD) and a National Center of Academic Excellence in Information Assurance/Cyber Defense Research (CAE-R). It has also been designated by the NSA and the U.S. Cyber Command as a National Center of Academic Excellence in Cyber Operations (CAE-Cyber Ops). Through these designations, the INI and CyLab participate in the:

- Federal CyberCorps Scholarship for Service (SFS) Program - Students pursuing graduate degrees in information security (MSIS or MSISPM) are eligible for scholarships under the SFS program.
- Information Assurance Scholarship Program (IASP) - Students pursuing graduate degrees in information security and seeking careers with the Department of Defense may be eligible for scholarships under the IASP.
- Capacity Building Program for Faculty from Historically Black and Hispanic Serving Institutions - The INI and CyLab developed a month-long, in-residence summer program to help build information assurance education and research capacity at colleges and universities designated as Minority Serving Institutions – specifically, Historically Black Colleges and Universities (HBCUs) and Hispanic Serving Institutions (HSIs). This program is supported through a grant from the National Science Foundation.

== Faculty and researchers ==
Faculty involved in teaching and advising in the INI programs are conducting research in all aspects of information networking and information security. Affiliated research centers are:

- Carnegie Mellon CyLab
- SEI's CERT Division

== Alumni ==
The INI has graduated over 1,400 alumni who currently occupy positions in a variety of sectors across industry, government and academia.
