= The Tartan (Carnegie Mellon University) =

Carnegie Mellon University's student newspaper

- Issue of The Tartan from November 25, 2019
- Type: Weekly student newspaper
- Format: Broadsheet
- Editor-in-chief: Lily Stern and Claire Thurston
- Founded: 1906
- Headquarters: Pittsburgh, Pennsylvania
- Circulation: 3,000
- Website: the-tartan.org

The Tartan (formerly known as The Carnegie Tartan) is the original student newspaper of Carnegie Mellon University. Publishing since 1906, it is one of Carnegie Mellon's largest and oldest student organizations. As of 2025, it has over 70 student members, who contribute on a weekly basis. It is funded by advertisements and the university's student activities fee.

== Sections ==
There are two sections in The Tartan. One is a standard broadsheet news section and the other is an entertainment, arts, and living tabloid section called pillbox.

=== News ===
The News section consists of the front page and two to four other pages of timely, campus-focused and Pittsburgh-focused content. The section's regular features include news analysis, personality profiles, investigative reporting, trend reporting, news briefs, coverage of the university's lectures and events, featured photographs, and topical statistics.

=== Features ===
The Features section is intended for campus (student, staff, faculty) centered longform journalism. It contains campus spotlights, student life, food and drink, behind-the-scenes process pieces, non-breaking news, and other Carnegie Mellon-specific pieces.

=== Forum ===
The Forum section is where Carnegie Mellon's campus discusses current issues. It contains letters to the editor, op-ed pieces, and opinion-based articles from the campus community. It also contains one or more editorial pieces that are the general opinion of the Editorial Staff called "EdBoard".

=== Science & Technology ===
This section covers the school's many achievements in the fields of robotics, computer science, biology, physics, and other fields, as well as lectures and events with a technology or science slant. As Carnegie Mellon is a research university, The Tartan's "SciTech" section holds a special significance to the newspaper's total university coverage. Envisioned in 2000, the SciTech section originally ran on alternate weeks with a Business section. However, in 2003 the Business section was discontinued and SciTech became a weekly section of the newspaper.

=== Sports ===
This section covers the weekly games, home and away, of Carnegie Mellon's sports teams, including intramural ones. Its features include analysis of professional sports leagues, commentaries, and a schedule of upcoming games and events.

=== pillbox ===
"pillbox" is The Tartan's arts, living, and entertainment section. As an insert accompanying the broadsheet pillbox covers the latest restaurant openings in the Oakland, Shadyside, and Squirrel Hill neighborhoods, campus fashion, on-campus concerts, dramatic performances, and campus life. It also contains music and movie reviews, original creative writing, comics, and larger feature articles that encompass a greater scope.

The second section of the paper has undergone several iterations, especially in the past 15 years. In the 1980s, the subsections included Features and Diversions. Features contained information on student living, campus life, and city life. Diversions focused specifically on Arts and Entertainment. At this time the second section was also a broadsheet. In 2000, as part of the newspaper's redesign several changes were made. Since the lines between Features and Diversions were already blurred, they were merged into an Arts and Living Section. SciTech and Business made up another subsection. Eventually, Business was discontinued, and Arts and Living became a tabloid section, pillbox.

In 2022, the stylization of the section's title was changed from all-caps "PILLBOX" to all-lowercase "pillbox".

== Staff ==
The staff of The Tartan is organized into two major levels, the Editorial Staff and regular staff.

=== Editorial Staff ===
The Editorial Staff constitutes the core of The Tartan's contributors, making decisions about the material submitted by the regular staff. The Editorial Staff is divided into editors and managers. Editors deal directly with the assigning, production, and processing of content, while managers coordinate their staffs to provide a service to the publication. It is the responsibility of members of the Editorial Staff to contribute to an opinion piece each week marked "From the Editorial Board. People are voted into the Editorial Staff by their peers.

=== Regular staff ===
Students are considered a junior staff writer after joining the newspaper. After contributing one article to each section or five articles to a single section, the student becomes a full staff writer.

== History ==
=== A brief independence: 2002–2004 ===
In 2002, The Tartan's leadership decided to leave the student funding process of Carnegie Mellon University. Advertising revenues were healthy, and the paper's leadership was confident that the paper could remain independent so long as future leadership maintained a strong focus on maintaining and growing revenue from advertising and subscriptions. Breaking away was also an attempt to remove the ethical burden of reporting on the same entities that allocated funds to the newspaper. The paper failed to grow and maintain its advertising income, and accumulated a large amount of debt by 2004. The Tartan rejoined the student funding process in the spring of 2004.

=== Natrat Controversies ===
The Tartan has traditionally published an annual joke issue called the "Natrat" (Tartan spelled backwards) on April Fool's Day. In the 2004 edition, a comic containing a racial slur for African Americans and a "joke" about murdering an African American, along with other offensive items, including a poem about the fatal rape of a woman with an ice skate blade, was published. Jim Puls, the editor-in-chief, and Alex Meseguer, the managing editor, resigned in the wake of the ensuing media attention and campus outcry. Bob Rost, the artist of the offending cartoon was also dismissed from the newspaper.

=== Controversy: November 2004 ===
In November 2004, The Tartan declined to run an advertisement submitted by conservative writer David Horowitz. Horowitz has gained publicity by placing or attempting to place similar ads in a number of student newspapers across the country. This action caused The Tartan to once again gain media attention, this time drawing fire from conservatives who viewed the paper as having a liberal agenda.
