= Swartz Center for Entrepreneurship =

Startup accelerator at Carnegie Mellon University

- Former name: Donald H. Jones Center for Entrepreneurship
- Type: Private
- Location: Pittsburgh, Pennsylvania, United States
- Website: Official website

The Swartz Center for Entrepreneurship is a startup incubator at Carnegie Mellon University.

== History ==
The Swartz Center is named after Jim Swartz, a venture capitalist who graduated from the university and in 2015 donated $31 million towards the creation of the centre. The centre opened on October 25, 2016.

Dave Mawhinney became the executive director of the center which was a continuation of his role at the Donald H. Jones Center for Entrepreneurship. Companies associated with the center include Duolingo and Mach9 Robotics.
