= Carnegie Mellon University =

University in Pittsburgh, Pennsylvania, US

- Former names: Carnegie Technical Schools (1900–1912); Carnegie Institute of Technology (1912–1967); Mellon Institute of Industrial Research (1913–1967)
- Motto: "My heart is in the work" – Andrew Carnegie
- Type: Private research university
- Established: November 15, 1900; 126 years ago
- Founders: Andrew Carnegie; Andrew Mellon; Richard B. Mellon
- Accreditation: MSCHE
- Academic affiliations: AAU; AITU; NAICU; ORAU; URA; Space-grant
- Endowment: $4.29 billion (2025)
- President: Farnam Jahanian
- Provost: James Garrett
- Faculty: 1,483
- Students: 16,676 (2024)
- Undergraduates: 7,744 (2024)
- Postgraduates: 8,932 (2024)
- Location: Pittsburgh, Pennsylvania, United States; 40°26′33″N 79°56′36″W
- Campus: 157.2 acres (63.6 ha); Large city
- Other campuses: US: Los Angeles; Mountain View; New York City; Washington; International: Doha; Kigali; Online
- Newspaper: The Tartan
- Colors: Red, black, steel gray, and iron gray
- Nickname: Tartans
- Sporting affiliations: NCAA Division III – UAA; Centennial; ACHA; IRA
- Mascot: Scotty the Scottish Terrier
- Website: cmu.edu
- ASN: 9

Carnegie Mellon University (CMU) is a private research university in Pittsburgh, Pennsylvania, United States. The institution was established in 1900 by Andrew Carnegie as the Carnegie Technical Schools. In 1912, it became the Carnegie Institute of Technology and began granting four-year degrees. In 1967, it became Carnegie Mellon University through its merger with the Mellon Institute of Industrial Research, founded in 1913 by Andrew Mellon and Richard B. Mellon and formerly a part of the University of Pittsburgh.

The university consists of seven colleges, including the College of Engineering, the Griffin School of Computer Science, the Dietrich College of Humanities and Social Sciences, and the Tepper School of Business. The university has its main campus located five miles (eight kilometers) from downtown Pittsburgh. It also has over a dozen degree-granting locations on six continents, including campuses in Qatar, Silicon Valley, and Kigali, Rwanda (Carnegie Mellon University Africa). In 2022, Carnegie Mellon enrolled 15,818 students across its multiple campuses from 117 countries and employed more than 1,400 faculty members. Carnegie Mellon is a member of the Association of American Universities and is classified among "R1: Doctoral Universities – Very high research activity".

Carnegie Mellon competes in NCAA Division III athletics as a founding member of the University Athletic Association. Carnegie Mellon fields eight men's teams and nine women's teams as the Tartans. The university's faculty and alumni include 21 Nobel Prize laureates and 13 Turing Award winners and have received 142 Emmy Awards, 64 Tony Awards, and 13 Academy Awards.

== History ==
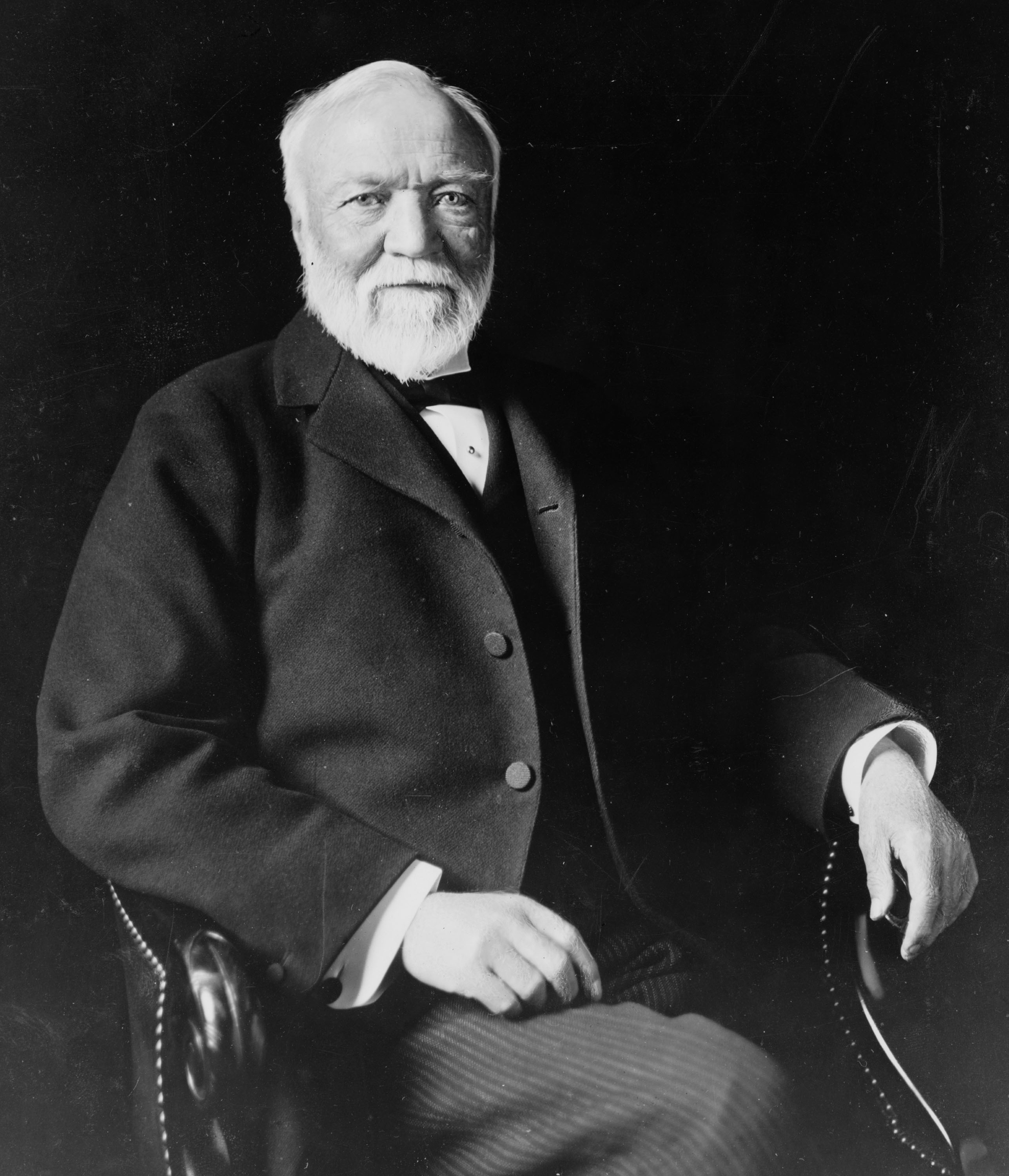
Andrew Carnegie, founder of the Carnegie Technical Schools

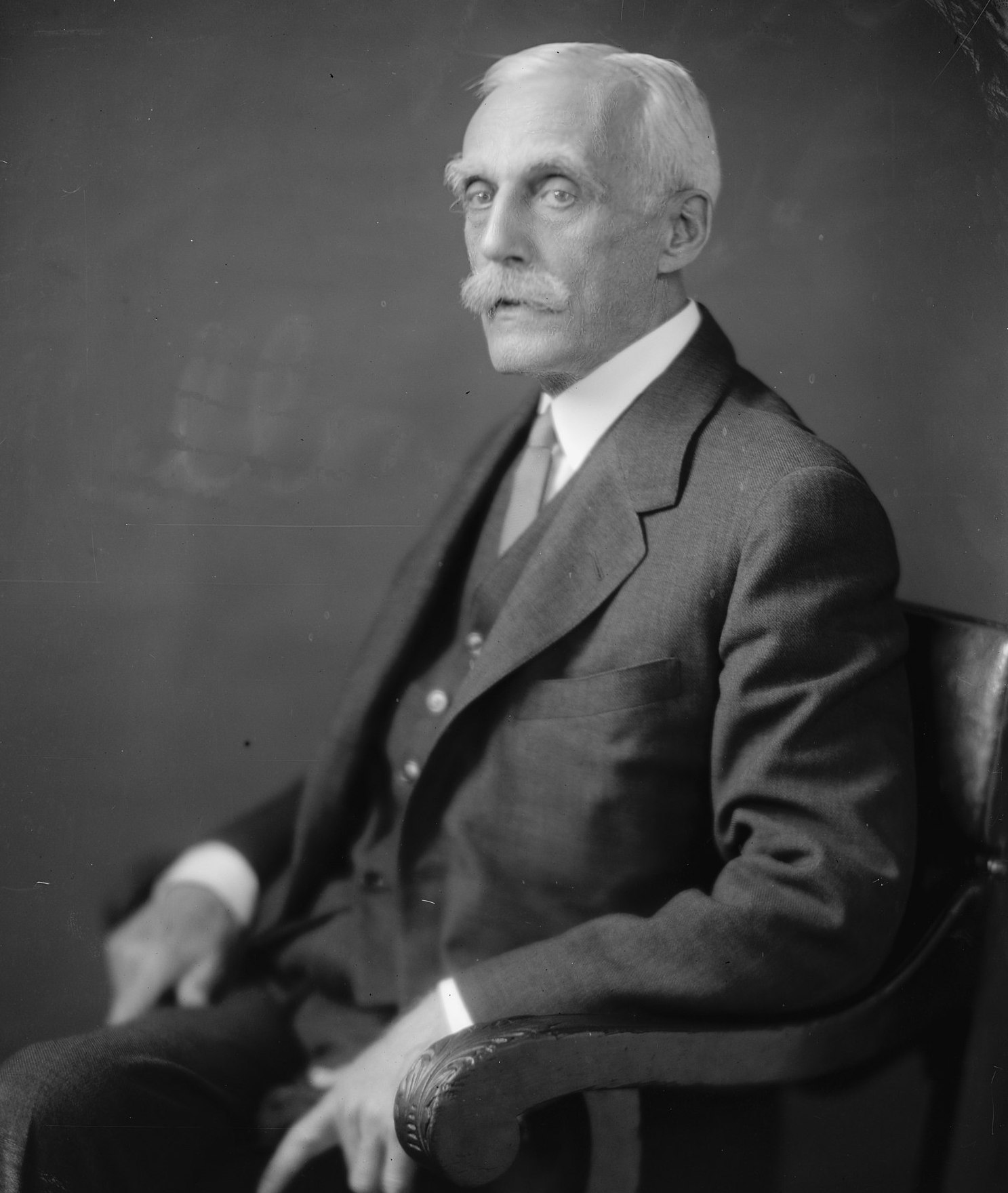
Andrew Mellon, co-founder of the Mellon Institute

The Carnegie Technical Schools were founded in 1900 in Pittsburgh, Pennsylvania by the Scottish-American industrialist and philanthropist Andrew Carnegie, who wrote "My heart is in the work", when he donated the funds to create the institution. Carnegie's vision was to open a vocational training school for the sons and daughters of working-class Pittsburghers, many of whom worked in his mills. Carnegie was inspired for the design of his school by the Pratt Institute in Brooklyn, New York, founded by industrialist Charles Pratt in 1887. In 1912, the institution changed its name to Carnegie Institute of Technology (CIT) and began offering four-year degrees. During this time, CIT consisted of four constituent schools: the School of Fine and Applied Arts, the School of Apprentices and Journeymen, the School of Science and Technology, and the Margaret Morrison Carnegie School for Women.

The Mellon Institute of Industrial Research was founded in 1913 by banker and industrialist brothers Andrew Mellon (who went on to become U.S. Treasury Secretary) and Richard B. Mellon in honor of their father, Thomas Mellon, patriarch of the Mellon family. The Institute began as a research organization that performed contract work for government and industry, initially as a department within the University of Pittsburgh. In 1927, the Mellon Institute was incorporated as an independent nonprofit. In 1937, the Mellon Institute's iconic building was completed on Fifth Avenue.

In 1967, with support from Paul Mellon, the Carnegie Institute of Technology merged with the Mellon Institute of Industrial Research to become Carnegie Mellon University. In 1973, Carnegie Mellon's coordinate women's college, the Margaret Morrison Carnegie College, merged its academic programs with the rest of the university. The industrial research mission of the Mellon Institute survived the merger as the Carnegie Mellon Research Institute (CMRI) and continued doing work on contract to industry and government. In 2001, CMRI's programs were subsumed by other parts of the university or spun off into autonomous entities.

During the 1970s and 1980s, the tenure of president Richard Cyert (1972–1990) witnessed a period of growth and development. The research budget grew from roughly $12 million annually in the early 1970s to more than $110 million in the late 1980s. Researchers in new fields such as robotics and software engineering helped the university to build its reputation. One example was the introduction of the "Andrew" computing network in the mid-1980s. This project linking all computers and workstations on campus set the standard for educational computing and established Carnegie Mellon as a technology leader in education and research. On April 24, 1985, cmu.edu, Carnegie Mellon's Internet domain, became one of the first six .edu domain names.

In the 1990s and into the 2000s, Carnegie Mellon solidified its status among American universities, consistently ranking in the top 25 in the national U.S. News & World Report rankings, and in the top 30 (ranking 28th in 2022) amongst universities worldwide. Carnegie Mellon is distinct in its interdisciplinary approach to research and education. Through the establishment of programs and centers outside the limitations of departments or colleges, the university has established leadership in fields such as computational finance, information systems, cognitive sciences, management, arts management, product design, behavioral economics, energy science and economics, human–computer interaction, entertainment technology, and decision science.

On April 15, 1997, Jared L. Cohon, former dean of the Yale School of Forestry & Environmental Studies, was elected president by Carnegie Mellon's board of trustees. During Cohon's presidency, Carnegie Mellon continued its trajectory of innovation and growth. His strategic plan aimed to leverage the university's strengths to benefit society in the areas of biotechnology and life sciences, information and security technology, environmental science and practices, the fine arts and humanities, and business and public policy. In 2006, following negotiations between President Cohon and South Australian Premier Mike Rann, CMU opened a campus of the Heinz College in the historic Torrens Building in Adelaide, Australia. President Cohon's term ended on June 30, 2013, after which he returned to the faculty at Carnegie Mellon.

On July 1, 2003, Carnegie Mellon launched "Insp!re Innovation", a $1 billion comprehensive fundraising campaign. Half of the campaign goal is intended for the endowment to provide long-lasting support for faculty, students and breakthrough innovations. The campaign brought in a total of $1.19 billion, with $578.5 million going toward Carnegie Mellon's endowment. It also enabled the university to establish 31 endowed professorships, 97 endowed fellowships and 250 endowed scholarships.

On September 7, 2011, William S. Dietrich II, the former chairman of Dietrich Industries, Inc., a subsidiary of Worthington Industries, Inc., pledged a gift of $265 million, effective on October 6, 2011, upon his death. In response to this gift, Carnegie Mellon renamed the College of Humanities and Social Sciences as the Marianna Brown Dietrich College of Humanities and Social Sciences after William Dietrich's mother.

On April 23, 2012, New York's Mayor Michael R. Bloomberg and New York University's President John Sexton announced an agreement between New York City, New York's MTA, and a consortium of academic institutions, and private technology companies that led to the creation in New York of a Center for Urban Science and Progress (CUSP), an applied science research institute composed of a partnership of institutions from around the globe, led by New York University with a consortium of universities including Carnegie Mellon, the University of Warwick, the City University of New York, the Indian Institute of Technology Bombay, and the University of Toronto.

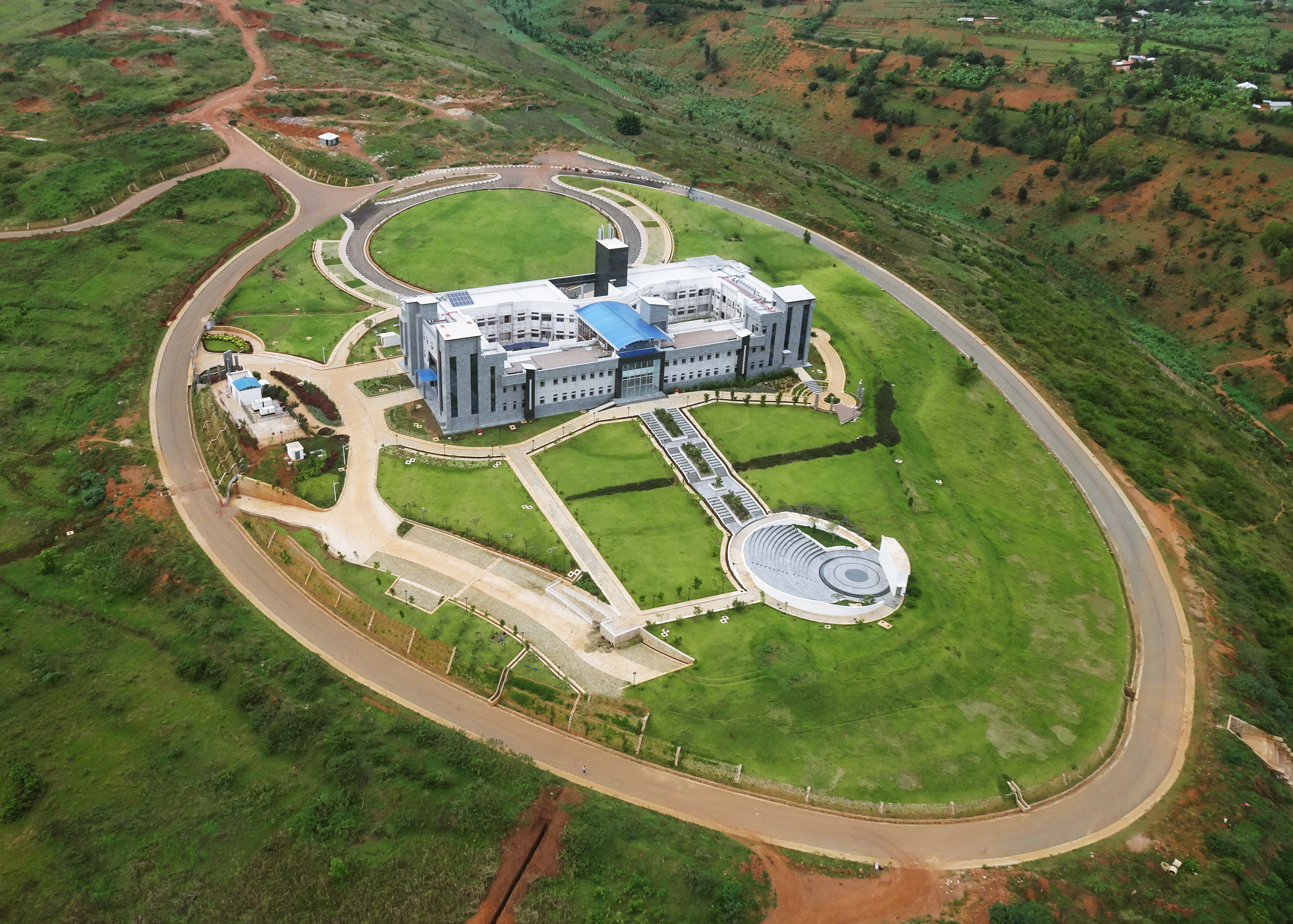
Carnegie Mellon's campus in Kigali, Rwanda

On February 5, 2013, Carnegie Mellon announced the selection of Subra Suresh, Director of the National Science Foundation and Dean of the Massachusetts Institute of Technology School of Engineering, as its ninth president effective July 1, 2013. Suresh stepped down in June 2017 and was replaced by Farnam Jahanian, the university's interim-president and former provost, in March 2018.

On October 30, 2019, Carnegie Mellon publicly announced the launch of "Make Possible: The Campaign for Carnegie Mellon University", a campaign which seeks to raise $2 billion to advance the university's priorities, including campus development.

On September 8, 2022, Carnegie Mellon announced a $275.7 million partnership with the Mastercard Foundation to support Carnegie Mellon University Africa in Kigali, Rwanda. Carnegie Mellon's Kigali campus provides graduate-level study in engineering and artificial intelligence.

On November 6, 2023, Carnegie Mellon Trustee Ray Lane and his wife Stephanie Lane invested $25 million in support of the university's Computational Biology department, which was renamed the Ray and Stephanie Lane Computational Biology Department in their honor.

On September 30, 2026, hedge fund manager Kenneth C. Griffin announced a US$3 billion pledge to Carnegie Mellon University, the largest single donation to an American university. The pledge would provide $2 billion for a new campus called Carnegie Mellon University Miami in the Wynwood neighborhood of Miami, as well as $1 billion for the Pittsburgh campus, divided equally between a fund for the university's discretionary top priorities and the School of Computer Science, which would be renamed the Kenneth C. Griffin School of Computer Science.

== Campus ==
=== Overview ===
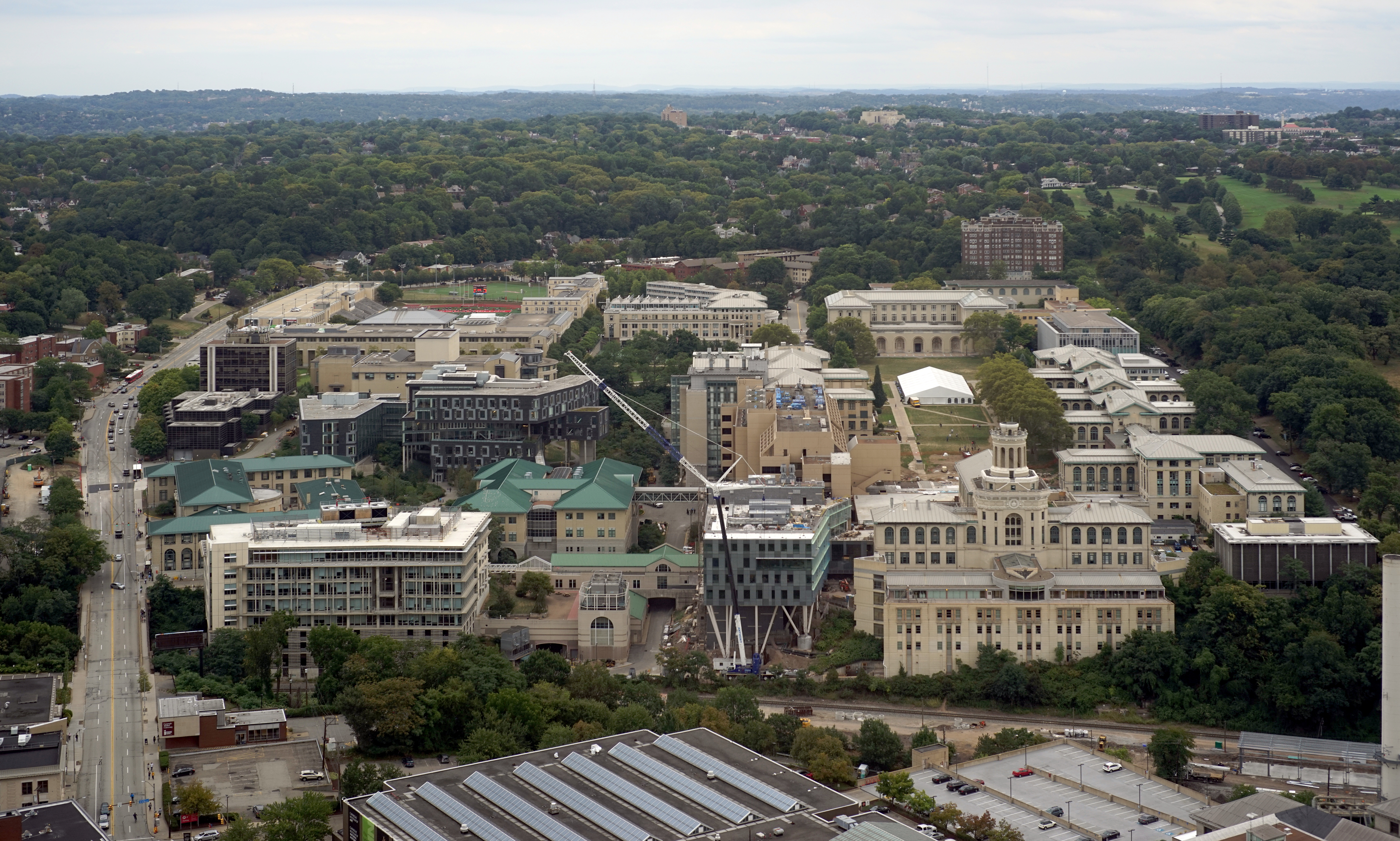
The main campus in Pittsburgh as seen from the 36th floor of the Cathedral of Learning at the University of Pittsburgh, August 2015

Carnegie Mellon's 157.2 acre (63 ha) main campus is five miles (8 km) from downtown Pittsburgh, between Schenley Park and the neighborhoods of Squirrel Hill, Shadyside, and Oakland. Carnegie Mellon is bordered to the west by the campus of the University of Pittsburgh. Carnegie Mellon owns 81 buildings in the Oakland and Squirrel Hill neighborhoods of Pittsburgh. (Note: Carnegie Mellon Master Plan Book (PDF). Carnegie Mellon University. May 20, 2002. Archived (PDF) from the original on October 30, 2005. pp. 7, 9. "Carnegie Mellon campus occupies a contiguous area of 110 acres" … "Carnegie Mellon owns 81 buildings in the Oakland and Squirrel Hill neighborhoods") (Note: Institutional Master Plan 2012 (Amended 2015) (PDF). Carnegie Mellon University. July 2, 2015. Archived (PDF) from the original on April 4, 2025. p. 4. "most of the university's activities still take place on the 143-acre traditional campus in Oakland")

For decades, the center of student life on campus was Skibo Hall, the university's student union. Built in the 1950s, Skibo Hall's design was typical of mid-century modern architecture but was poorly equipped to deal with advances in computer and internet connectivity. The original Skibo Hall was razed in the summer of 1994 and replaced by a new student union that is fully Wi-Fi enabled. Known as the University Center, the building was dedicated in 1996. In 2014, Carnegie Mellon re-dedicated the University Center as the Cohon University Center in recognition of the eighth president of the university, Jared Cohon.

A large grassy area known as "The Cut" forms the backbone of the campus, with a separate grassy area known as "The Mall" running perpendicular. The Cut was formed by filling in a ravine (hence the name) with soil from a nearby hill that was leveled to build the College of Fine Arts building.

The northwestern part of the campus (home to Hamburg Hall, Newell-Simon Hall, Smith Hall, and Gates Hillman Complex) was acquired from the United States Bureau of Mines in the 1980s.

Carnegie Mellon has been purchasing 100% renewable energy for its electricity since 2011.

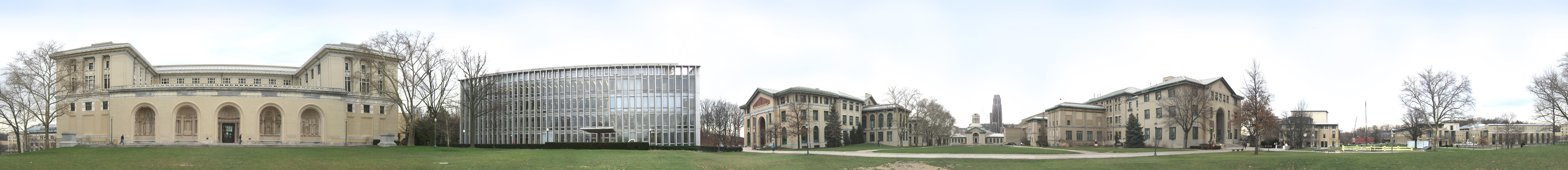
A panoramic view of Carnegie Mellon University's Pittsburgh campus from the College of Fine Arts Lawn.
From left to right: College of Fine Arts, Hunt Library, Baker and Porter Hall, Hamerschlag Hall, University of Pittsburgh's Cathedral of Learning (in the background), Wean Hall and Doherty Hall, Purnell Center, and the Cohon University Center. Also visible are "The Fence", and the Walking to the Sky sculpture.

=== Early architecture ===
The campus began to take shape in the Beaux-Arts architecture style of George Carnegie Palmer and Henry Hornbostel of Palmer & Hornbostel, winners of the 1904 competition to design the original institution and later the founder of the Carnegie Mellon School of Architecture. Most buildings around the university's main campus were originally roofed with green Ludowici Spanish tile.

There was little change to the campus between the first and second World War. A 1938 master plan by Githens and Keally suggested acquisition of new land along Forbes Avenue, but the plan was not fully implemented. The period starting with the construction of the Hall of the Arts building (former home of the Graduate School of Industrial Administration) in 1952 and ending with Wean Hall in 1971 saw the institutional change from Carnegie Institute of Technology to Carnegie Mellon University. Around this time an expanding student population demanded improved facilities for student life, athletics and libraries. The campus expanded to Forbes Avenue from its original land along Schenley Park.

=== Mid-20th century ===
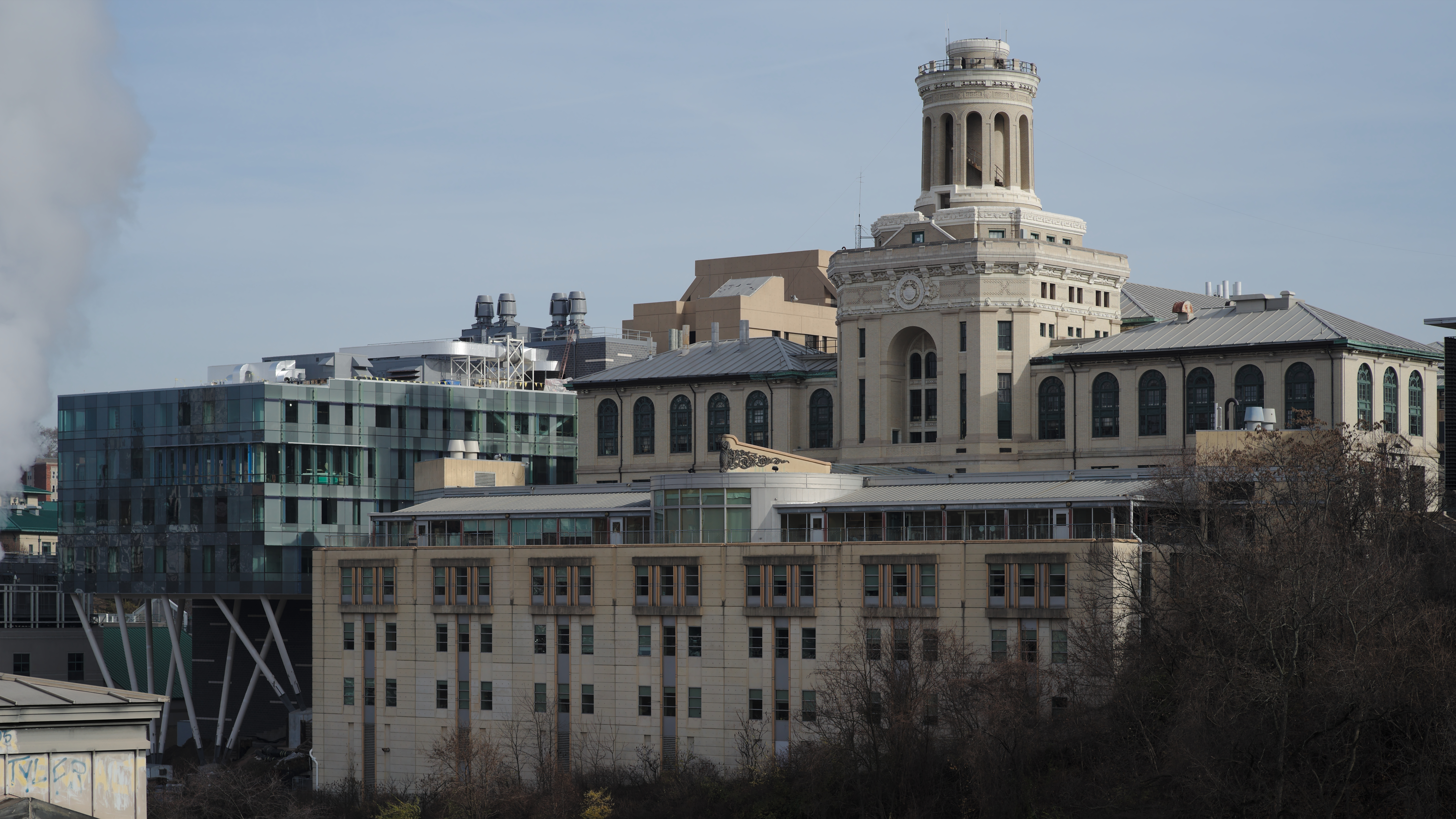
Hamerschlag, Roberts, and Scott Halls are three of the teaching facilities of the College of Engineering.

The buildings of this era reflected contemporary architectural styles. The International Style, with its rejection of historical tradition and its emphases on functionalism and expression of structure, had been in vogue in European settings since the 1930s. It came late to the Carnegie Mellon campus because of the hiatus in building activity and a general reluctance among American universities to abandon historical styles. By the 1960s, the International Style was adopted to accomplish needed expansion quickly and affordably with the swelling of student ranks in the aftermath of the GI Bill in 1944. Each building was a unique architectural statement that may have acknowledged the existing campus in its placement, but not in its form or materials.

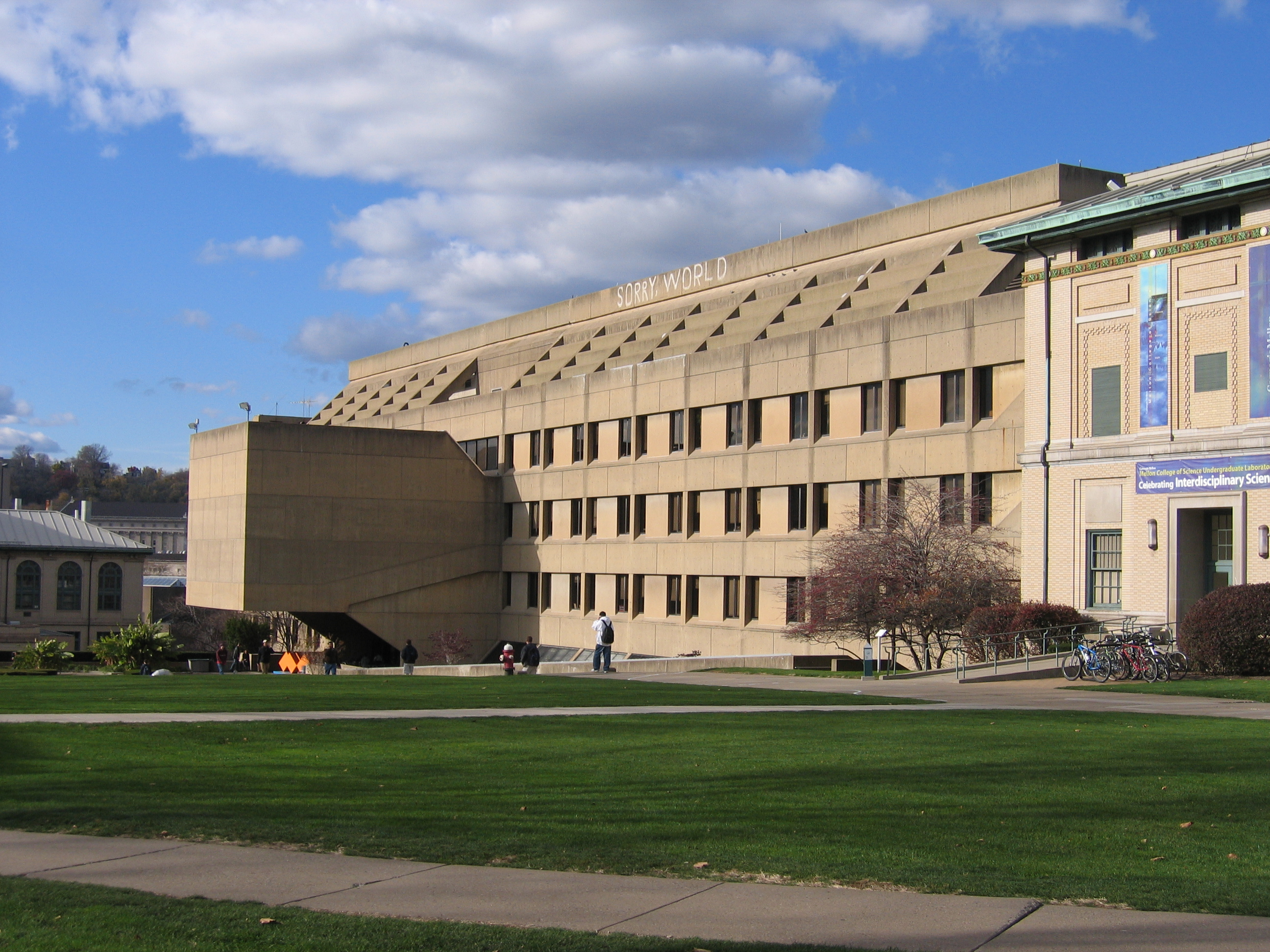
Wean Hall, home of the world's first internet-enabled soda vending machine

Starting in the 1990s the university built a new university center (Cohon University Center), theater and drama building (Purnell Center for the Arts), business school building (Tepper School of Business), and several dormitories.

=== 2000s ===
Baker Hall was renovated in the early 2000s, and new chemistry labs were established in Doherty Hall soon after. Several computer science buildings, such as Newell-Simon Hall, also were established, renovated or renamed in the early 2000s.

In 2006, Carnegie Mellon Trustee Jill Gansman Kraus donated the 80-foot (24 m)-tall sculpture Walking to the Sky, which was placed on the lawn facing Forbes Avenue between the Cohon University Center and Warner Hall. The sculpture was controversial for its placement, the general lack of input from the campus community, and its (lack of) aesthetic appeal.

The Gates Hillman Complex, which houses the School of Computer Science

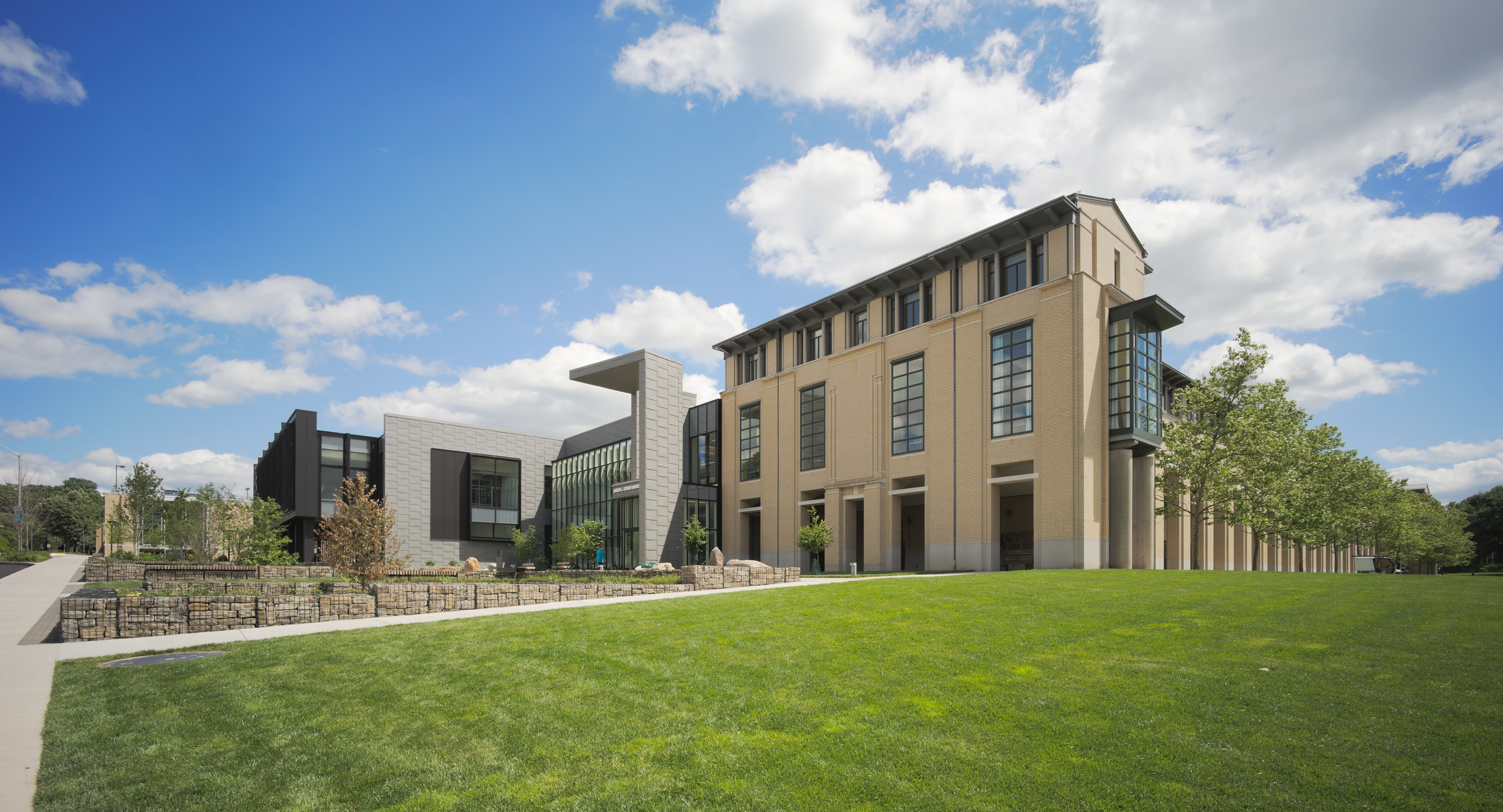
Cohon University Center, which contains an indoor swimming pool, bookstore, student club facilities, gym, and cafeteria

The Gates Hillman Complex opened for occupancy on August 7, 2009. It sits on a 5.6-acre (2.3 ha) site on the university's West Campus, surrounded by Cyert Hall, the Purnell Center for the Arts, Doherty Hall, Newell-Simon Hall, Smith Hall, Hamburg Hall, and the Robert Mehrabian Collaborative Innovation Center. It contains 318 offices as well as labs, computer clusters, lecture halls, classrooms and a 255-seat auditorium. The Gates Hillman Complex was made possible by a $20 million lead gift from the Gates Foundation and an additional $10 million grant from the Henry L. Hillman Foundation. The Gates Hillman Complex and the Purnell Center for the Arts are connected by the Randy Pausch Memorial Footbridge.

In September 2012, Carnegie Mellon announced the construction of the Sherman and Joyce Bowie Scott Hall on the Pittsburgh campus. The building is situated between Hamerschlag Hall, Roberts Hall, and Wean Hall and houses the Wilton E. Scott Institute for Energy Innovation, Bertucci Nanotechnology Lab, Engineering Research Accelerator (formerly known as the Institute for Complex Engineered Systems), Disruptive Health Technologies Institute, and the Department of Biomedical Engineering. In November 2013, Carnegie Mellon announced a $67 million gift from David Tepper, who previously donated $56 million, to develop the Tepper Quadrangle on the north campus. The Tepper Quad includes a new Tepper School of Business facility across Forbes Avenue from a renovated and expanded Hamburg Hall (home to Heinz College) as well as other university-wide buildings and a welcome center to serve as a public gateway to the university.

In April 2015, Carnegie Mellon, in collaboration with Jones Lang LaSalle, announced the planning of a second office space structure, alongside the Robert Mehrabian Collaborative Innovation Center, an upscale and full-service hotel, and retail and dining development along Forbes Avenue. This complex will connect to the Tepper Quadrangle, the Heinz College, the Tata Consultancy Services Building, and the Gates-Hillman Center to create an innovation corridor on the university campus. The effort is intended to continue to attract major corporate partnerships to create opportunities for research, teaching, and employment with students and faculty.

Alongside the Tepper Quad and Hamburg Hall, Carnegie Mellon finished construction in 2020 on TCS Hall, an innovation center made possible with a $35 million gift from Tata Consultancy Services. Carnegie Mellon announced plans to collaborate with Emerald Cloud Lab to construct the world's first cloud lab in a university setting. The Carnegie Mellon University Cloud Lab was planned to be completed by the spring of 2023. Carnegie Mellon also planned to construct a new mechanical engineering building by fall 2023 (Scaife Hall), a new $105 million athletics center by fall 2024 (Highmark Center for Health, Wellness and Athletics), a $210 million Science Futures Building (R.K. Mellon Hall of Sciences) by 2026, as well as a Robotics Innovation Center at Hazelwood Green, along with new dormitories and other buildings.

On April 12, 2024, Carnegie Mellon broke ground for construction of its new Richard King Mellon Hall of Sciences, a 338,900-square-foot addition to its campus.

== Organization ==
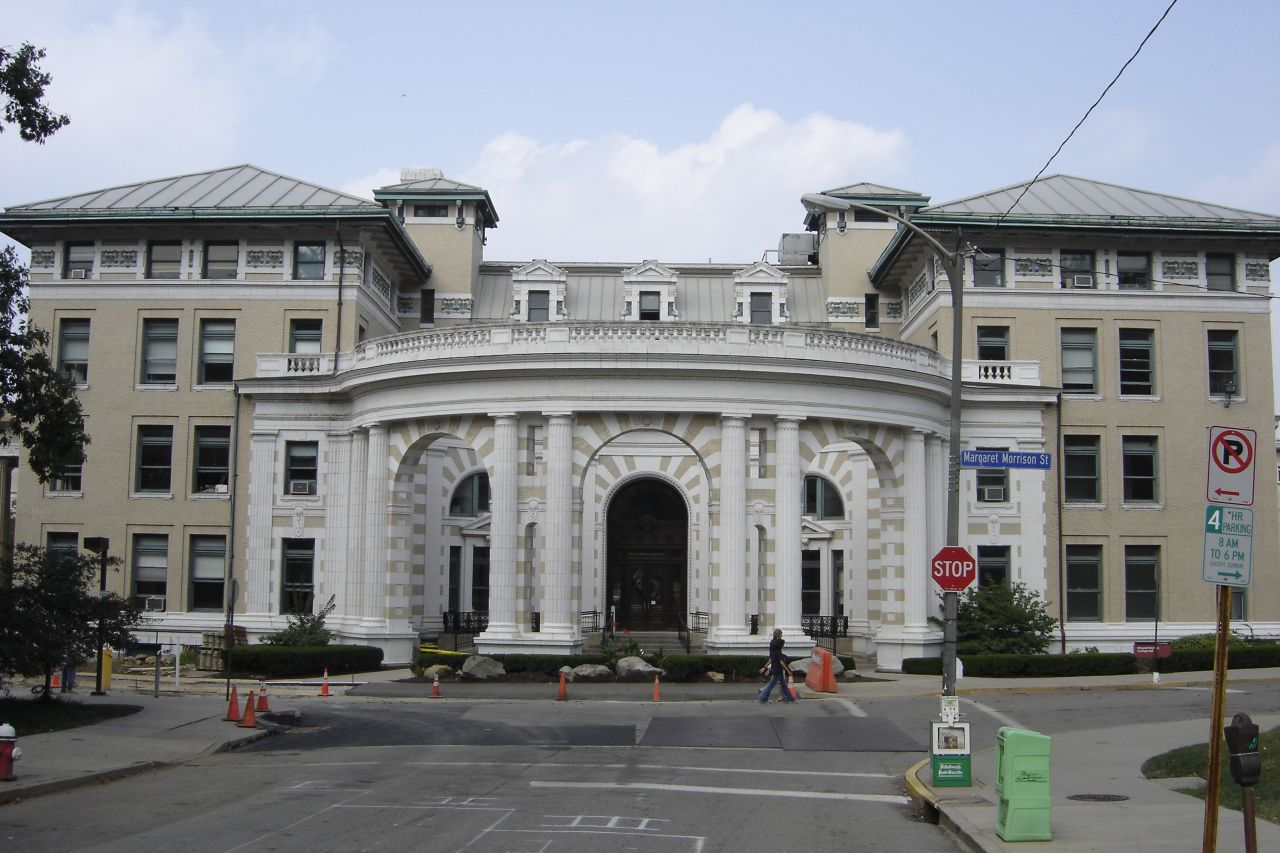
Margaret Morrison Carnegie Hall, home of the Carnegie Mellon School of Architecture and Carnegie Mellon School of Design

The College of Engineering includes seven engineering departments (Biomedical Engineering, Chemical Engineering, Civil and Environmental Engineering, Electrical and Computer Engineering, Engineering and Public Policy, Mechanical Engineering, and Materials Science and Engineering), two interdisciplinary institutes (the Information Networking Institute and the Integrated Innovation Institute), and the Engineering Research Accelerator.

The College of Fine Arts is one of the oldest colleges of fine arts in the United States, and today it is a federation of five distinct schools: The School of Architecture, The School of Music, The School of Design, The School of Drama, and The School of Art. The college shares research projects, interdisciplinary centers and educational programs with other units across the university. The College of Fine Arts runs master's programs in Arts Management and Entertainment Industry Management with the Heinz College, as well as interdisciplinary undergraduate programs with the Dietrich College of Humanities and Social Sciences (BHA), Mellon College of Science (BSA), the School of Computer Science (BCSA), and the College of Engineering (BESA).

The Dietrich College of Humanities and Social Sciences is the university's liberal arts and professional studies college and emphasizes the study of the human condition through rigorous analysis and technology. Departments include English, History, Modern Languages, Philosophy, Psychology, Social and Decision Sciences, and Statistics as well as an Institute for Politics and Strategy. The college also offers undergraduate degree programs in Information Systems, Economics (jointly with the Tepper School of Business), and the Bachelor of Humanities and Arts (BHA) with the College of Fine Arts.

The H. John Heinz III College of Information Systems and Public Policy offers top-ranked master's degrees in Public Policy and Management, Health Care Policy and Management, Medical Management, Public Management, Information Systems and Management, Information Technology, and Information Security Policy and Management. The Heinz College also runs master's programs in Arts Management and Entertainment Industry Management with the College of Fine Arts. Heinz College consists of the School of Information Systems & Management and the School of Public Policy & Management. It also offers several PhD and executive education programs.

The Mellon College of Science has four departments: Biological Sciences, Chemistry, Mathematical Sciences, and Physics. The college is expanding efforts in neuroscience, green chemistry, bioinformatics, computational biology, nanotechnology, computational finance, cosmology, sensor research, and biological physics. It also offers an undergraduate Bachelor of Science and Arts (BSA) degree in conjunction with the College of Fine Arts.

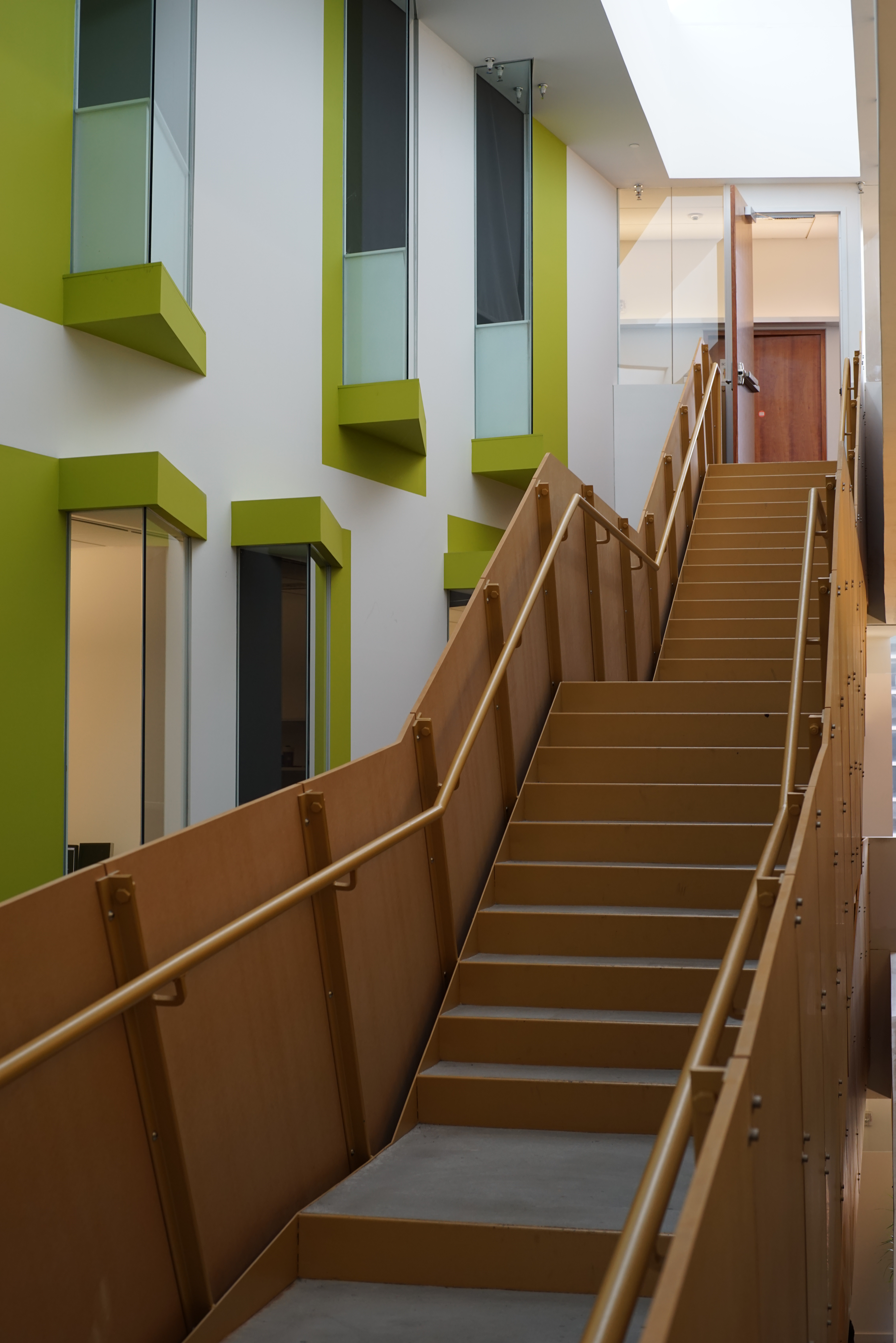
Inside the Gates-Hillman Complex of the School of Computer Science

The Griffin School of Computer Science: Carnegie Mellon helped define, and continually redefines, the field of computer science. The School of Computer Science is recognized internationally as one of the top schools for computer science and has been consistently ranked the best in the country. The School of Computer Science includes seven departments: the Computer Science Department, Ray and Stephanie Lane Computational Biology Department, Robotics Institute, Machine Learning Department, the Human–Computer Interaction Institute, the Language Technologies Institute, and the Software and Societal Systems Department (S3D). It additionally offers the undergraduate Bachelor of Computer Science and Arts (BCSA) degree in conjunction with the College of Fine Arts.

The Tepper School of Business (formerly the Graduate School of Industrial Administration) offers undergraduate programs in Business Administration and Economics (the latter jointly with the Dietrich College), master's degrees in Business Administration (MBA), Product Management (MSPM) and joint degrees in Computational Finance (MSCF) with the Dietrich College of Humanities and Social Sciences, the Mellon College of Science, the Heinz College, and the School of Computer Science. In addition, joint degrees are offered with Civil and Environmental Engineering and the Heinz College. The Tepper School also offers doctoral degrees in several areas and presents a number of executive education programs. Following a $67 million donation from alumnus David A. Tepper in 2013, the university expanded the undergraduate business program and named the school after him. In summer of 2015, a new curriculum was formally instated.

In addition to research and academic institutions, the university hosts several other educationally driven programs. The Pennsylvania Governor's School for the Sciences, a state-funded summer program that aims to foster interest in science amongst gifted high school students is run on campus every summer. The university also runs Carnegie Mellon Pre-College, a six-week residential program for rising juniors and seniors in high school and the Summer Academy for Math and Science (SAMS), a free-of-charge STEM immersion program for students from underrepresented backgrounds. The Cyert Center for Early Education is a child care center for Carnegie Mellon faculty and staff, as well as an observational setting for students in child development courses. Carnegie Mellon also developed the Open Learning Initiative which provides free courses online in a variety of fields to students globally.

=== IDeATe ===
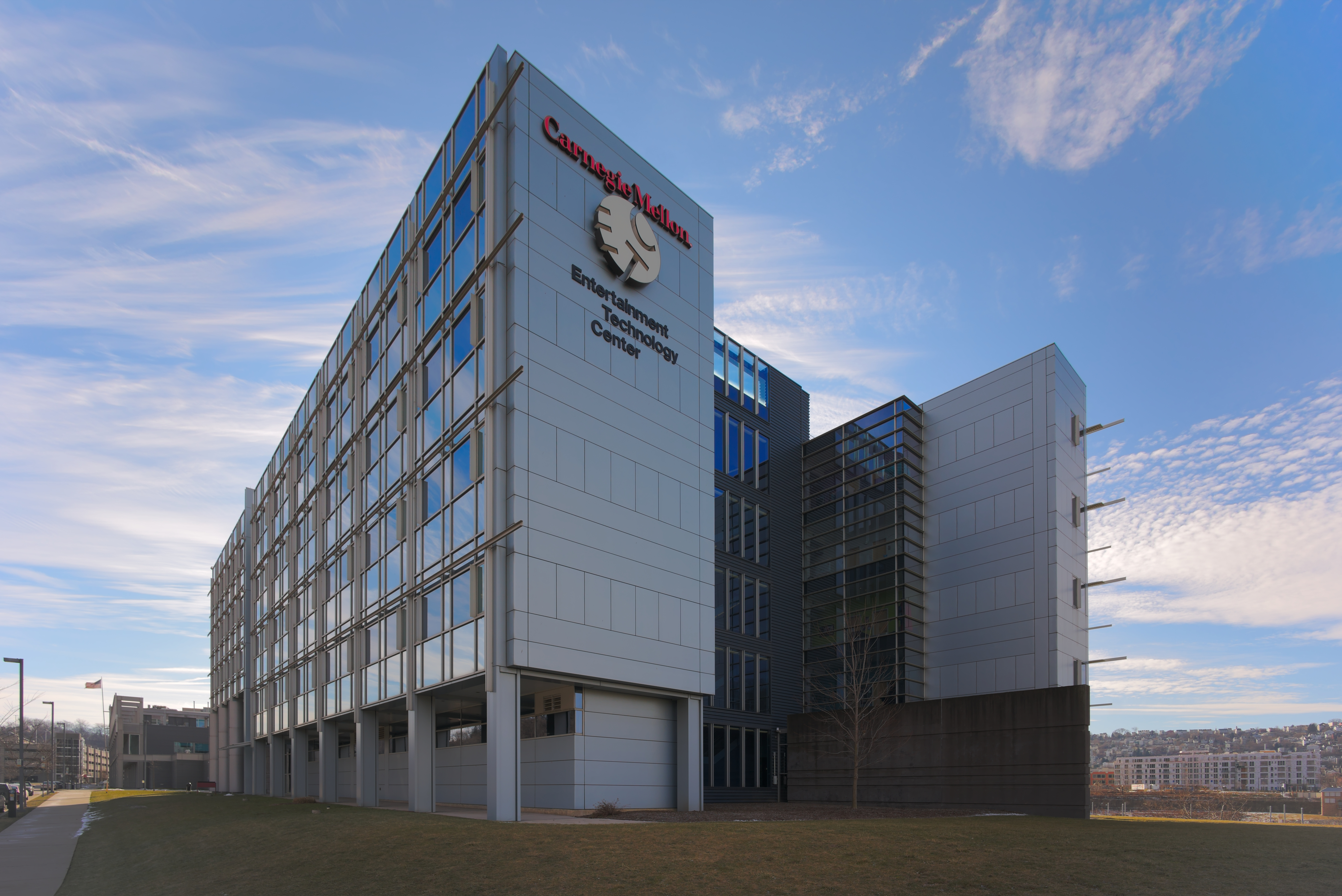
Carnegie Mellon's Entertainment Technology Center

Carnegie Mellon also runs the Integrative Design, Arts, and Technology (IDeATe) Network to provide university-wide arts and technology education to students from every college. IDeATe allows students to take minors or concentrations in Animation and Special Effects, Entrepreneurship for Creative Industries, Game Design, Intelligent Environments, Learning Media, Media Design, Physical Computing, and Sound Design. IDeAte will also offer graduate master's degrees in Emerging Media, Game Design, Integrative Innovation for Products and Services, Computational Data Science, Urban Design, and Production Technology and Management. IDeATe also manages the Entertainment Technology Center (ETC) in conjunction with the School of Computer Science and the College of Fine Arts. Each master's degree program has an option to study in the CMU Integrative Media Program (IMP) at Steiner Studios in New York City. IDeATe Network will be based on the Pittsburgh campus upon the development of recently acquired property on Forbes Avenue west of Junction Hollow.

== Academics ==
=== Rankings ===
Academic rankings

National
- Forbes: 25
- U.S. News & World Report: 14 (tie)
- Washington Monthly: 189
- WSJ/College Pulse: 56

Global
- ARWU: 100–150
- QS: 52
- THE: 24
- U.S. News & World Report: 126

2026 U.S. News & World Report Graduate Rankings
| Biological Sciences | 30 |
| Business | 16 |
| Business-Business Analytics | 2 |
| Business-Information Systems | 1 |
| Business-Production/Operations | 8 |
| Business-Management | 15 |
| Business-Supply Chain/Logistics | 5 |
| Chemistry | 35 |
| Computer Science | 1 |
| Computer Science-Artificial Intelligence | 1 |
| Computer Science-Programming Language | 1 |
| Computer Science-Systems | 1 |
| Computer Science-Theory | 2 |
| Earth Sciences | 58 |
| Economics | 21 |
| Engineering | 10 |
| Engineering-Computer | 4 |
| Engineering-Civil | 10 |
| Engineering-Electrical/Electronic/Communications | 8 |
| Engineering-Environmental/Environmental Health | 9 |
| Engineering-Mechanical | 9 |
| Engineering-Materials | 12 |
| English | 50 |
| Fine Arts | 2 |
| Fine Arts-Time-Based/New Media | 1 |
| History | 42 |
| Mathematics | 21 |
| Mathematics-Discrete Mathematics and Combinatorics | 4 |
| Mathematics-Applied Math | 12 |
| Physics | 32 |
| Public Affairs | 20 |
| Public Affairs-Information Technology and Management | 1 |
| Public Affairs-Environmental Policy and Management | 10 |
| Public Affairs-Public Policy Analysis | 7 |
| Public Affairs-Urban Policy | 12 |
| Psychology | 14 |
| Psychology-Cognitive | 2 |
| Statistics | 6 |

Nationally, U.S. News & World Report placed Carnegie Mellon in 14th place tied with Cornell among American research universities in their 2026-2027 rankings. Many of its graduate programs have been ranked in national and international surveys. In 2022, U.S. News ranked Carnegie Mellon as having 23 graduate programs in the Top 10 nationwide and 16 in the Top 5 nationwide, including three programs ranked first: Artificial Intelligence, Programming Languages, and Information and Technology Management. In particular, the CMU School of Computer Science has been consistently ranked the best in the nation, tied with MIT, Stanford, and UC Berkeley.

Globally, Carnegie Mellon is ranked 24th by Times Higher Education and 52nd by QS World University Rankings. Carnegie Mellon was named one of the "New Ivies" by Newsweek and Forbes.

In 2010, The Wall Street Journal ranked Carnegie Mellon 1st in computer science, 4th in finance, 10th overall, and 21st in engineering according to job recruiters. Carnegie Mellon ranks thirteenth among "Best Colleges By Salary Potential (Bachelor's Only)" in the United States according to PayScale's 2016–17 study. In 2024, Carnegie Mellon's Tepper School of Business placed 9th in an annual ranking of U.S. business schools by Bloomberg Businessweek.

In 2016, The Hollywood Reporter ranked the School of Drama 3rd in the world among undergraduate drama schools. In 2015, the same publication ranked the MFA program at the School of Drama 5th in the world.

Carnegie Mellon's Dietrich College of Humanities and Social Sciences was ranked 55th for social sciences and 60th for humanities in the world by Times Higher Education for 2020. Dietrich College is also ranked 20th for social sciences among Shanghai Jiao Tong University's world's top 100 universities.

Carnegie Mellon is one of 66 elected members of the Association of American Universities and one of 29 members (one of 13 American members) of the World Economic Forum Global University Leaders Forum.

=== Admissions ===
| | 2023 | 2022 | 2021 | 2020 | 2019 | 2018 | 2017 | 2016 |
|---|---|---|---|---|---|---|---|---|
| Applicants | 33,707 | 34,261 | 32,896 | 26,189 | 27,634 | 24,351 | 20,497 | 21,189 |
| Admits | | 3,873 | 4,447 | 4,524 | 4,267 | 4,170 | 4,550 | 4,601 |
| Admit rate | 11% | 11.30% | 13.52% | 17.27% | 15.44% | 17.12% | 22.20% | 21.71% |
| Enrolled | | 1,736 | 1,896 | 1,637 | 1,585 | 1,572 | 1,676 | 1,552 |
| Yield | 45% | 45% | 42.64% | 36.18% | 37.15% | 37.70% | 36.68% | 33.73% |

U.S. News & World Report rates admission to Carnegie Mellon as "most selective". For the class of 2026 (enrolling in fall 2022), Carnegie Mellon received 34,261 applications and admitted approximately 3,873 (11%), with 1,736 enrolling. The acceptance rates of the individual colleges and programs range from Carnegie Mellon School of Architecture's 30% to Carnegie Mellon School of Drama's 3%. The largest college, in terms of the class of 2025 enrollment, is the College of Engineering with 499 students, followed by the Dietrich College of Humanities and Social Sciences with 391, and the Mellon College of Science with 266. The smallest college is the School of Design, with 34. The middle 50% range of SAT scores of enrolled freshmen was 720-770 for reading and writing, and 770-800 for math, while the middle 50% range of the ACT composite score was 34–35. The university is need-blind for domestic applicants. The class of 2026 enrolled students from 46 U.S. states and 42 countries. Undergraduate tuition for 2023-2024 is $62,260, and room and board is $17,468.

=== Research ===
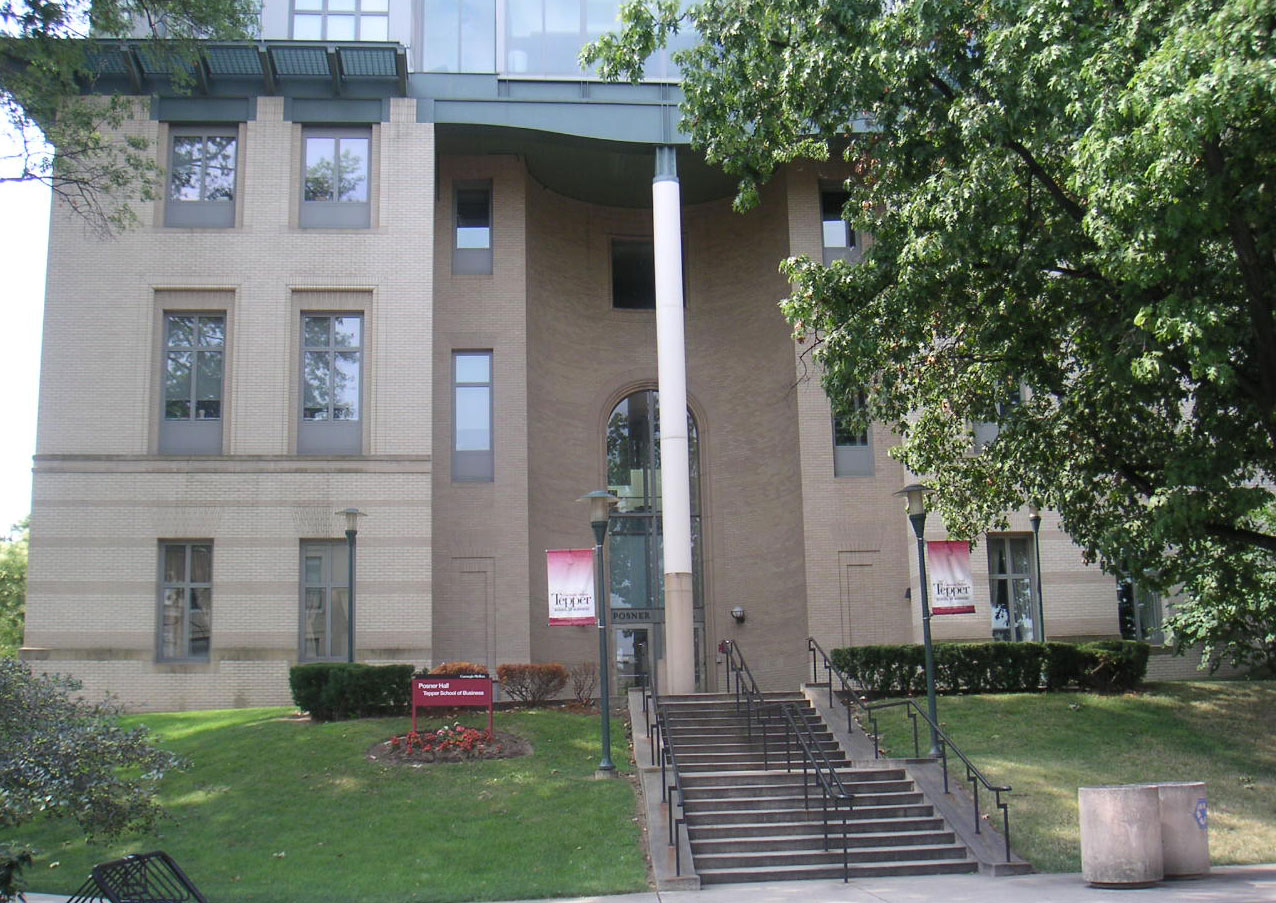
Posner Hall, former home of the Tepper School of Business

CMU is classified among "R1: Doctoral Universities – Very High Research Activity". For the 2021 fiscal year, the university spent $402 million on research. The primary recipients of this funding were the School of Computer Science ($100.3 million), the Software Engineering Institute ($71.7 million), the College of Engineering ($48.5 million), and the Mellon College of Science ($47.7 million). The research money comes largely from federal sources, with a federal investment of $234.9 million in 2021. The federal agencies that invest the most money include the National Science Foundation and the Department of Defense, which contributed $70.5 million and $90.4 million in 2021, respectively.

The recognition of Carnegie Mellon as one of the best research facilities in the nation has a long history. As early as the 1987 federal budget, CMU was ranked as third in the amount of federal research funds received with $41.5 million, with only MIT and Johns Hopkins receiving more research funds from the Department of Defense.

The Pittsburgh Supercomputing Center (PSC) is a joint effort between Carnegie Mellon, University of Pittsburgh, and Westinghouse Electric Company. PSC was founded in 1986 by its two scientific directors, Ralph Roskies of the University of Pittsburgh and Michael Levine of Carnegie Mellon. PSC is a leading partner in the TeraGrid, the National Science Foundation's cyberinfrastructure program.

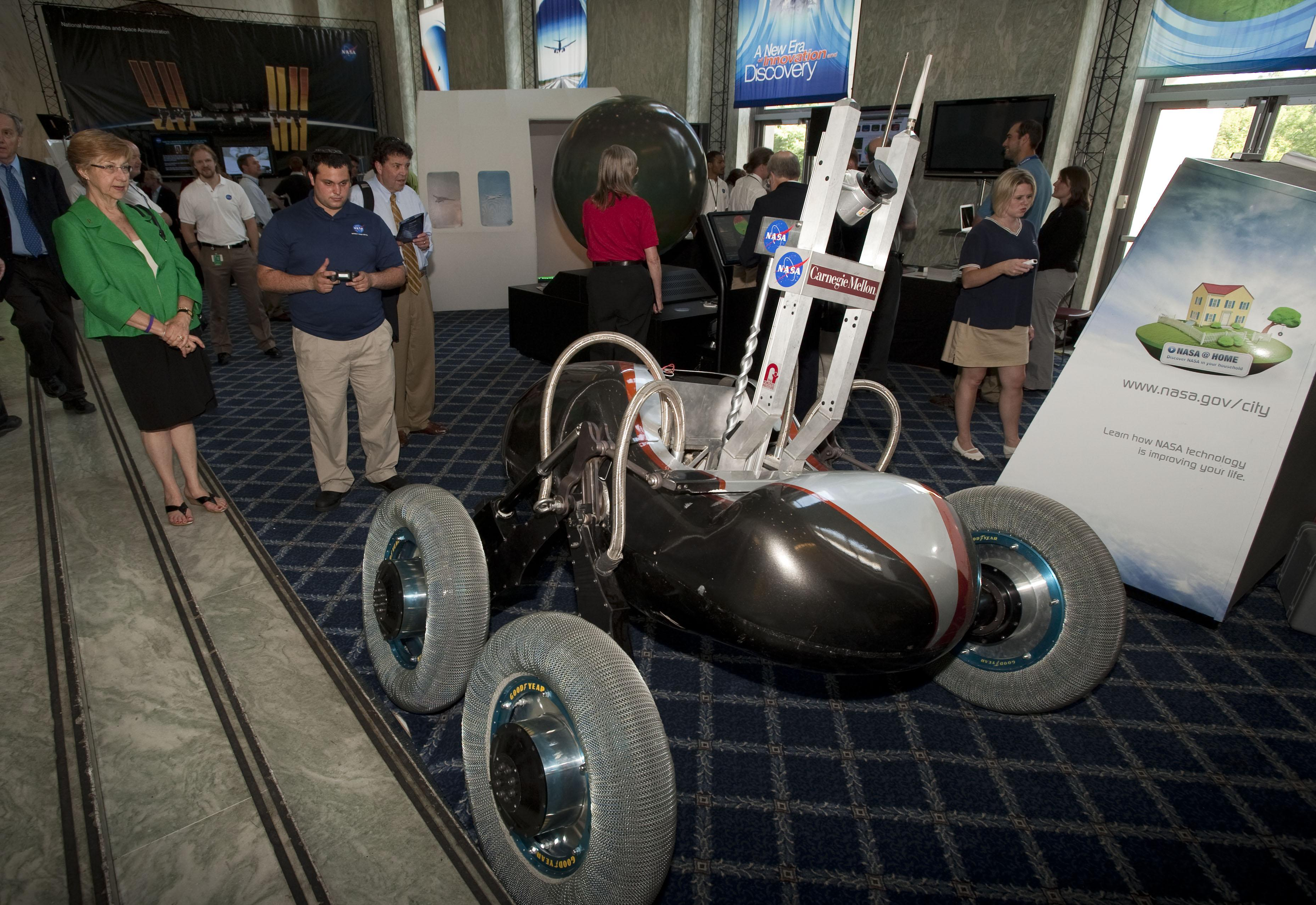
The Scarab lunar rover is being developed by the RI.

The Neuroscience Institute (NI) is a university-wide research institute that was founded in 2018 as a successor to an earlier effort, known as Brainhub. Combining research in computer science, engineering, machine learning, statistics, and cognitive science with basic neuroscience, NI aims to promote research that will improve the human condition. Devices developed by the institute have been designed to enable communication for locked-in patients, treatments for Parkinson's disease, improved brain imaging technology using artificial intelligence, and electrodes that work with coarse, curly hair. NI includes over 30 faculty and 100 trainees from four colleges and oversees two PhD programs (the Program in Neural Computation and the Program in Systems Neuroscience) that have received support from the National Institutes of Health. Numerous philanthropic gifts help support NI research. NI also provides direct administrative and monetary support for the Center for Neural Basis of Cognition, a long-running collaboration with the University of Pittsburgh.

The Robotics Institute (RI) is a division of the School of Computer Science and considered to be one of the leading centers of robotics research in the world. The Field Robotics Center (FRC) has developed a number of significant robots, including Sandstorm and H1ghlander, which finished second and third in the DARPA Grand Challenge, and Boss, which won the DARPA Urban Challenge. The Robotics Institute has partnered with a spinoff company, Astrobotic Technology Inc., to land a CMU robot on the moon by 2016 in pursuit of the Google Lunar XPrize. The robot, known as Andy, is designed to explore lunar pits, which might include entrances to caves. The RI is primarily sited at Carnegie Mellon's main campus in Newell-Simon hall.

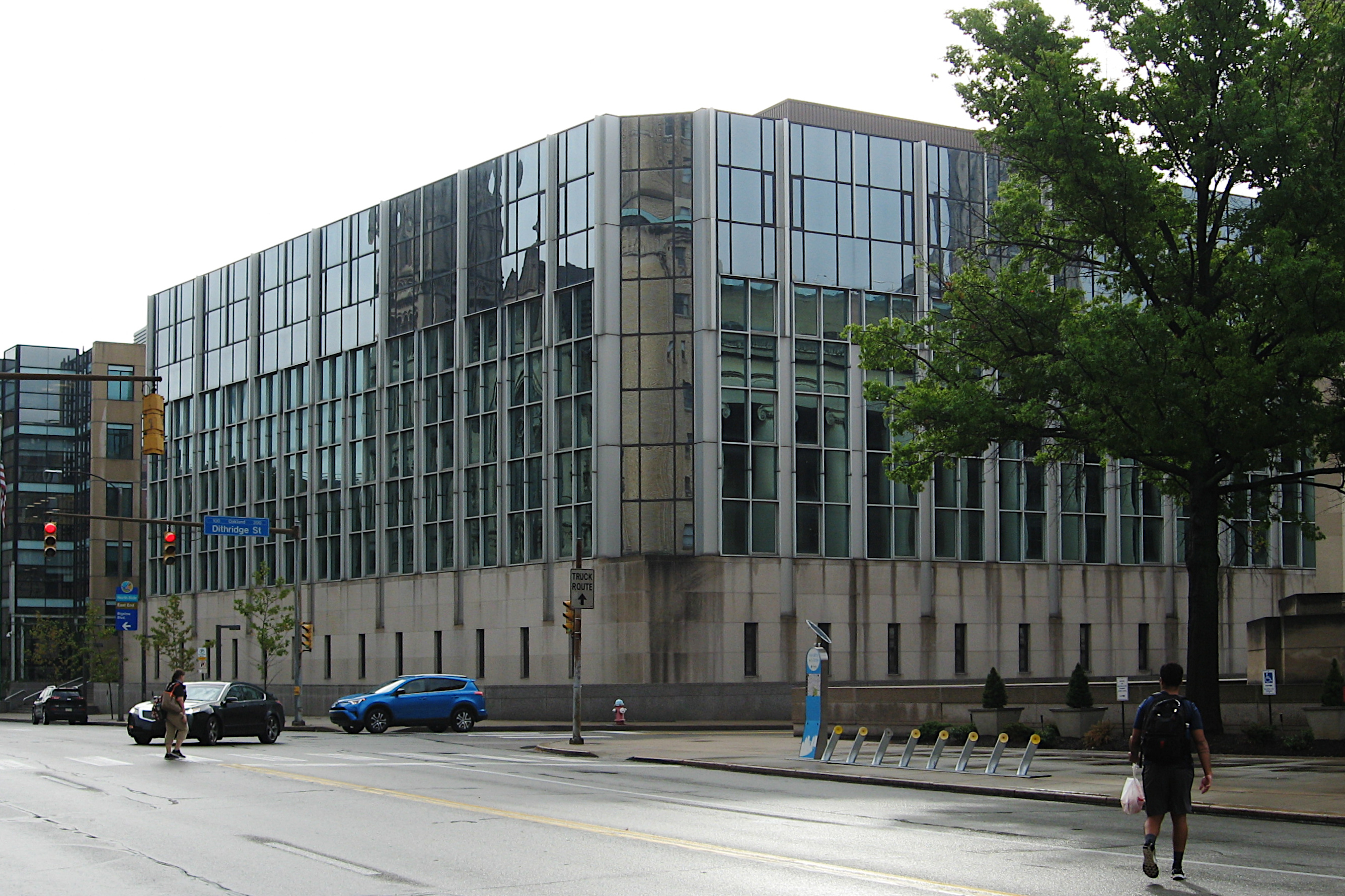
The Software Engineering Institute building on Fifth Avenue

The Software Engineering Institute (SEI) is a federally funded research and development center sponsored by the U.S. Department of Defense and operated by Carnegie Mellon, with offices in Pittsburgh, Pennsylvania, USA and Arlington, Virginia. The SEI publishes books on software engineering for industry, government and military applications and practices. The organization is known for its Capability Maturity Model (CMM) and Capability Maturity Model Integration (CMMI), which identify essential elements of effective system and software engineering processes and can be used to rate the level of an organization's capability for producing quality systems. The SEI is also the home of CERT/CC, the federally funded computer security organization. The CERT Program's primary goals are to support secure requirements and development of computer systems and ensure that appropriate technology and systems management practices are used to resist attacks on networked systems and to limit damage and ensure continuity of critical services subsequent to attacks, accidents, or failures.

The Human–Computer Interaction Institute (HCII) is a division of the School of Computer Science and is considered one of the leading centers of human–computer interaction research, integrating computer science, design, social science, and learning science. Such interdisciplinary collaboration is the hallmark of research done throughout the university.

The Language Technologies Institute (LTI) is another unit of the School of Computer Science and is famous for being one of the leading research centers in the area of language technologies. The primary research focus of the institute is on machine translation, speech recognition, speech synthesis, information retrieval, parsing and information extraction. Until 1996, the institute existed as the Center for Machine Translation that was established in 1986. From 1996 onwards, it started awarding graduate degrees and the name was changed to Language Technologies Institute.

The Ray and Stephanie Lane Computational Biology Department, one of the seven departments in the School of Computer Science, was established in 2007 (as Lane Center for Computational Biology), officially became a department within the School of Computer Science in 2009, and named the Ray and Stephanie Lane Computational Biology Department in 2023. The department is the leader in developing computational methodologies to advance biomedical research.

Carnegie Mellon is also home to the Carnegie School of management and economics. This intellectual school grew out of the Tepper School of Business in the 1950s and 1960s and focused on the intersection of behavioralism and management. Several management theories, notably search-and-matching theory, behavioral boundaries of the firm, real business-cycle theory, rational expectations, life-cycle theory, and bounded rationality were established by Carnegie School management scientists and economists.

Carnegie Mellon also develops cross-disciplinary and university-wide institutes and initiatives to take advantage of strengths in various colleges and departments and develop solutions in critical social and technical problems. To date, these have included the Cylab Security and Privacy Institute, the Wilton E. Scott Institute for Energy Innovation, the Neuroscience Institute, the Simon Initiative, and the Disruptive Healthcare Technology Institute.

Carnegie Mellon has made a concerted effort to attract corporate research labs, offices, and partnerships to the Pittsburgh campus. Apple Inc., Intel, Google, Microsoft, Disney, Facebook, IBM, General Motors, Bombardier Inc., Yahoo!, Uber, Tata Consultancy Services, Ansys, Boeing, Robert Bosch GmbH, and the Rand Corporation have established a presence on or near campus. In collaboration with Intel, Carnegie Mellon has pioneered research into claytronics.

=== International activities ===
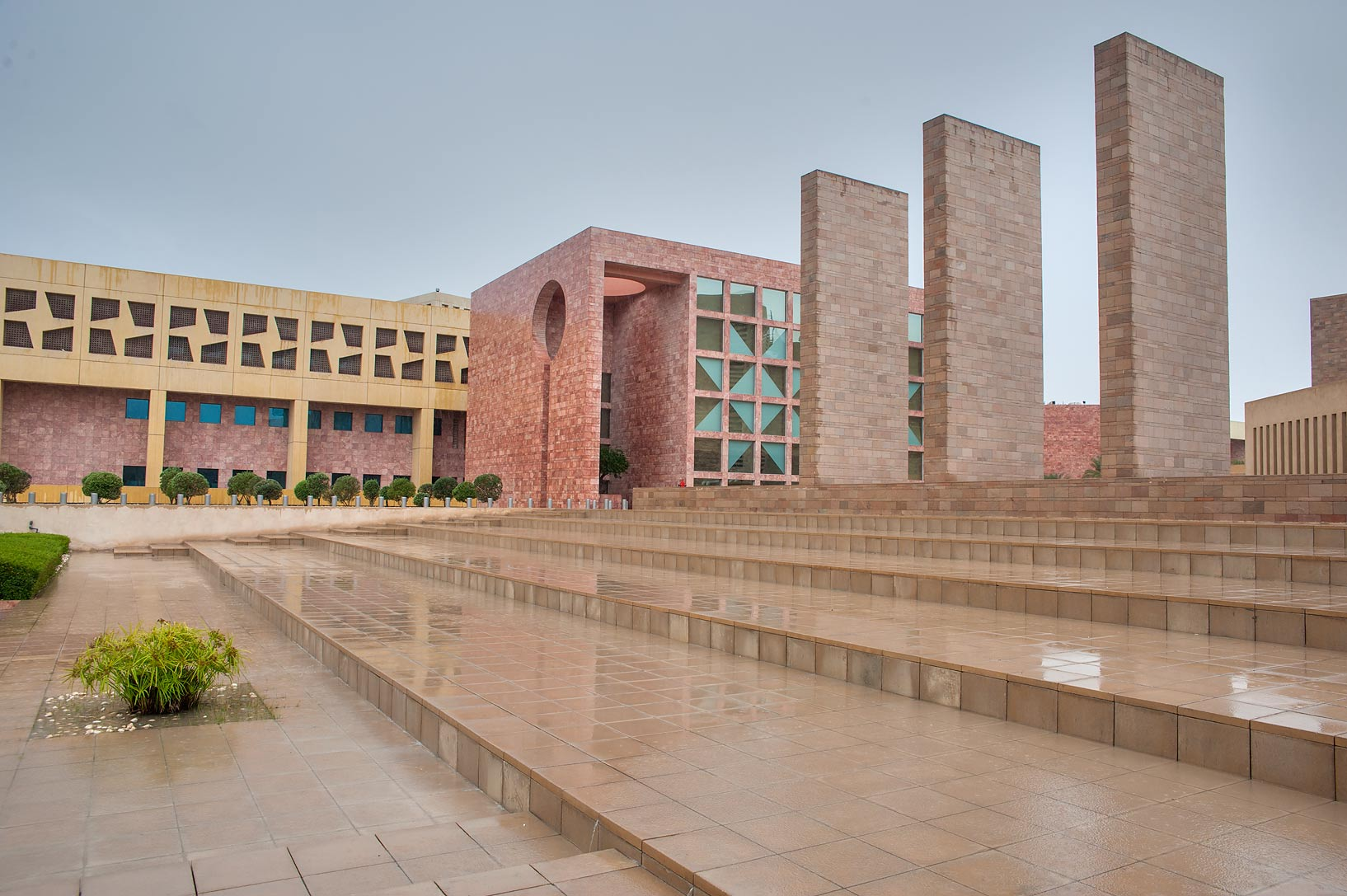
Part of Carnegie Mellon's Education City campus in Qatar

In addition to its Pittsburgh campus, Carnegie Mellon has a branch campus in the Middle East, Carnegie Mellon University in Qatar, which offers a full undergraduate curriculum with degree programs in artificial intelligence, computer science, business administration, biology and information systems. The campus is located in Doha's Education City which is home to multiple other U.S. universities all of which are funded by the Qatar Foundation. The Qatari campus has been the subject of controversy, as Islamic cultural values and laws in Qatar differ greatly from the core values of Carnegie Mellon. Additionally, Carnegie Mellon and other U.S. universities in Education City have been criticized for being essentially complicit in Qatar's corruption, connections with Hamas and their questionable human rights record by continuing to operate there.

It also has graduate-level extension campuses in Mountain View, California in the heart of Silicon Valley (offering masters programs in Software Engineering and Software Management). The Tepper School of Business maintains a satellite center in downtown Manhattan. The Heinz College, the Institute for Politics and Strategy, and the Department of Engineering and Public Policy host centers in Washington, D.C. as part of degree programs, research, and government affairs initiatives as well as being a part of the University of California, Washington Center. Carnegie Mellon also established the Integrative Media Program at Steiner Studios in Brooklyn, New York. Carnegie Mellon also maintains the Carnegie Mellon Los Angeles Center in North Hollywood, California where students in the Master of Entertainment Industry Management program are required to relocate to Los Angeles in their second year and attend classes at this facility.

Carnegie Mellon's Information Networking Institute offers graduate programs in Athens, Greece and Kobe, Japan, in collaboration with Athens Information Technology and the Hyogo Institute of Information Education Foundation, respectively. In the fall of 2007, the cities of Aveiro and Lisbon, Portugal were added to the Information Networking Institute's remote locations. The Software and Societal Systems Department (S3D) offers graduate programs in Coimbra, Portugal. The Entertainment Technology Center offers graduate programs in Portugal, Japan, and Singapore. The Human–Computer Interaction Institute offers a master's degree in conjunction with the University of Madeira, in Portugal at the jointly founded Madeira Interactive Technologies Institute. The College of Engineering has an international location in Kigali, Rwanda offering the Master of Science in Information Technology and the Master of Science in Electrical and Computer Engineering.

=== Libraries ===
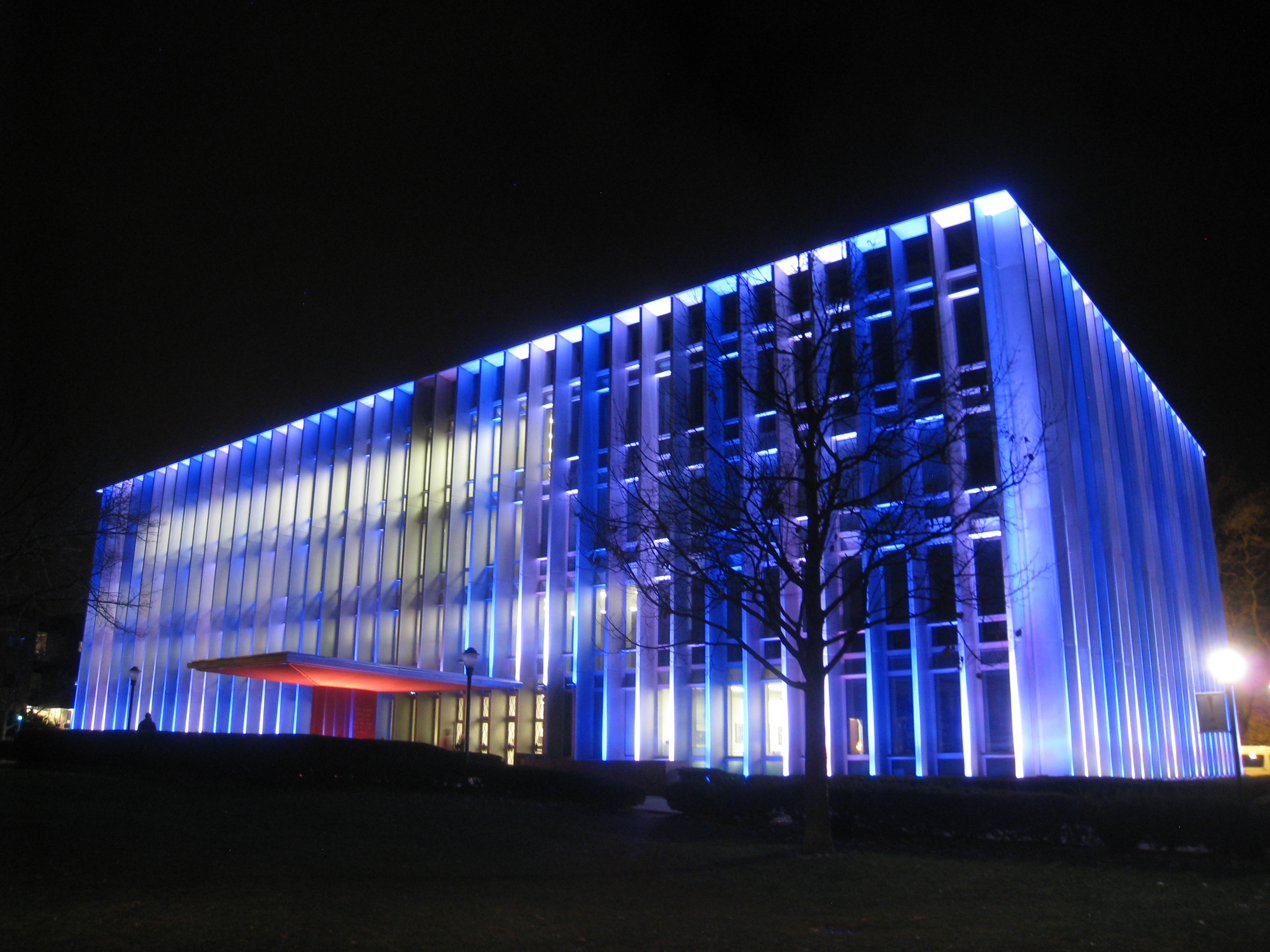
Hunt Library is the largest library on Carnegie Mellon's Pittsburgh campus.

The Libraries of Carnegie Mellon include Hunt Library, the Roger Sorrells Engineering & Science Library, the Mellon Institute Library, the Posner Center, and the Qatar Library. Additionally, the Libraries' Million Book Project (2001–2008) sparked development of the Universal Digital Library. The university libraries host a number of full text special collections for public access, including the Andrew Carnegie Collection, Herbert A. Simon Collection, Allen Newell Collection, the H. John Heinz III Collection, the Pittsburgh Jewish Newspapers Project, and the Posner Memorial Collection. Carnegie Mellon students and faculty have access to the Carnegie Library of Pittsburgh and some University of Pittsburgh libraries through consortial agreements with those institutions. The Hunt Institute for Botanical Documentation (HIBD), dedicated as the Rachel McMasters Miller Hunt Botanical Library in 1961, has been a research division of CMU since its founding. The HIBD is an international bibliographical research and service in the fields of botany, horticulture, and the history of the plant sciences and has a significant research library and art holdings on the 5th floor of Hunt Library. The university's Software Engineering Institute also houses a research library.

Carnegie Mellon also manages the Naval Reserve Officer Training Corps in Pittsburgh on which students throughout Pittsburgh's universities rely. Carnegie Mellon partners with the University of Pittsburgh to provide opportunities in Army Reserve Officers' Training Corps and Air Force Reserve Officer Training Corps to its students.

Carnegie Mellon is accredited by the Middle States Commission on Higher Education.

=== Collaboration with the University of Pittsburgh ===
Carnegie Mellon neighbors the campus of the University of Pittsburgh, and in some cases, buildings of the two universities are intermingled. This helps to facilitate myriad academic and research collaborations between the two schools, including such projects as the Pittsburgh Supercomputing Center, the Pittsburgh Life Sciences Greenhouse, the Immune Modeling Center, the Center for the Neural Basis of Cognition, the University of Pittsburgh Cancer Institute, as well as the National Science Foundation-supported Pittsburgh Science of Learning Center. Further, the universities also offer multiple dual and joint degree programs such as the Medical Scientist Training Program, the Molecular Biophysics and Structural Biology Graduate Program, the Joint CMU-Pitt Ph.D. Program in Computational Biology, the Center for Neural Basis of Cognition, and the Law and Business Administration program. Some professors hold joint professorships between the two schools, and students at each university may take classes at the other (with appropriate approvals). CMU students and faculty also have access to the University of Pittsburgh library system, as well as the Carnegie Library of Pittsburgh. The two universities also co-host academic conferences, such as the 2012 Second Language Research Forum. In 2015, in conjunction with the University of Pittsburgh and UPMC, Carnegie Mellon became a partner of the Pittsburgh Health Data Alliance to leverage data analysis in health care.

== Discoveries and innovation ==
=== Natural sciences ===
- Electron diffraction – Clinton J. Davisson won the 1937 Nobel Prize in Physics for his discovery of electron diffraction in the famous Davisson–Germer experiment, which confirmed the de Broglie hypothesis that particles of matter have a wave-like nature, which is a central tenet of quantum mechanics. In particular, their observation of diffraction allowed the first measurement of a wavelength for electrons.
- Kevlar – Developed by Stephanie Kwolek at DuPont in 1965, the high-strength material was first used commercially in the early 1970s as a replacement for steel in racing tires. Kevlar has many applications, ranging from bicycle tires and racing sails to bulletproof vests, all due to its high tensile strength-to-weight ratio; by this measure, it is five times stronger than steel.
- Spectroscopy – John L. Hall won the 2005 Nobel Prize in Physics with Theodor W. Hänsch and Roy J. Glauber for his pioneering work on laser-based precision spectroscopy and the optical frequency comb technique.
- Neutron scattering – Clifford G. Shull was awarded the 1994 Nobel Prize in Physics with Canadian Bertram Brockhouse for their pioneering work in neutron scattering, a technique that reveals where atoms are within a material like ricocheting bullets reveal where obstacles are in the dark.

=== Computer and applied sciences ===
- Alice (software) – freeware (for non-commercial purposes) object-based educational programming language with an integrated development environment (IDE).
- Andrew Project – distributed computing environment developed at Carnegie Mellon beginning in 1982. It was an ambitious project for its time and resulted in an unprecedentedly vast and accessible university computing infrastructure. The goal was to have connected 3M computer workstations.
- Artificial intelligence – Several of the first AI software programs were created at Carnegie Mellon. These include the Logic Theorist, (Note: "History of AI at CMU". Carnegie Mellon University. Archived from the original on October 31, 2026. year 1955) General Problem Solver, and Soar.. HiTech, a computer chess machine built under the direction of Hans Berliner, was the first to achieve grandmaster status.
- Autonomous vehicle – Navlab, the first autonomous car program in the US, was developed by Carnegie Mellon. Since then, H1ghlander and Sandstorm autonomous vehicles were developed at Carnegie Mellon and placed 3rd and 2nd in the DARPA Grand Challenge, and Carnegie Mellon's Boss won the DARPA Grand Challenge (2007). The university continues to be a leader in autonomous research and development.
- BLISS – system programming language developed at Carnegie Mellon by W. A. Wulf, D. B. Russell, and A. N. Habermann around 1970. It was perhaps the best known systems programming language until C made its debut in 1972.
- CAPTCHAs – challenge-response test to combat spam and bots was invented in 2000 by Luis von Ahn, Nick Hopper, John Langford and Manuel Blum.
- Dynamic random-access memory – In 1966, Robert H. Dennard invented the one-transistor memory cell consisting of a transistor and a capacitor for which a patent was issued in 1968. It became the basis for today's dynamic random-access memory (DRAM).
- Email attachment – In 1992, Nathaniel Borenstein co-created the MIME standard that's used by all email programs to send photos and other files over the Internet.
- Emoticon – The first true emoticon was developed at Carnegie Mellon by Scott Fahlman in 1982. (Note: "Little Brags of Big Ideas". Carnegie Mellon University. Archived from the original on March 14, 2026. Archived #brag11)
- Encrypting online information – Shafi Goldwasser co-authored work in semantic security in her 1982 encryption scheme and introduced zero-knowledge proofs (ZKPs), which guarantee no information from plaintext can be efficiently learned from cyphertext. Semantic security is a provably secure property that inspired the addition of OAEP to fortify the RSA protocol in 1994, which secures credit card data, etc. ZKPs and interactive proof systems are used in blockchains and DeFi e.g. to confirm sufficient balance for a transaction without revealing the balance.
- EteRNA – RNA sequencing 2010 browser-based "game with a purpose", using crowdsourcing to allow players fold and shift RNA molecules to solve on-screen puzzles, which has produced new insights into genetic encoding and molecular biology.
- Hashtag – In a 2007 tweet, Chris Messina proposed vertical/associational grouping of messages, trends, and events on Twitter by the means of hashtags.
- Java – class-based object oriented programming language that was originally developed by James Gosling at Sun Microsystems (which has since been acquired by Oracle) and released in 1995 as a core component of Sun Microsystems' Java platform.

Simplified evolution of Unix systems. The Mach kernel was a fork from BSD 4.3 that led to NeXTSTEP / OPENSTEP, upon which macOS and iOS is based.

- Mach (kernel) – Richard Rashid and Avie Tevanian developed Mach at Carnegie Mellon from 1985 to 1994, ending with Mach 3.0, which is a true microkernel. Mach was developed as a replacement for the kernel in the BSD version of Unix, so no new operating system would have to be designed around it. Experimental research on Mach appears to have ended, although Mach and its derivatives exist within a number of commercial operating systems. These include NeXTSTEP and OPENSTEP, upon which macOS and iOS are based.
- MEMS – Harvey C. Nathanson co-invented the first MEMS (micro-electro-mechanical systems) device, the Resonant Gate Transistor, as a band-pass filter. Typical MEMS devices include oscillators, as well as sensors such as the accelerometers found in smartphones and video game controllers, and the gyroscopes used in automobiles and wearables.
- Model checking – a formal problem-solving technique for verifying computer hardware and software proposed by Edmund Clarke in 1981. In 1994, he introduced a method to apply abstract interpretation techniques to reduce the state-space complexity of temporal-logic model checking. His arguments gained new weight with the discovery that Intel's then-new Pentium chip made errors on certain math problems.
- Multiprocessing – William Wulf developed C.mmp in 1971, a precursor to modern multi-core processors.
- Xerox PARC – Founded in 1969 by George Pake and Jack Goldman, Xerox PARC has been at the heart of numerous revolutionary computer developments as laser printing, Ethernet, the modern personal computer, graphical user interface (GUI) and desktop paradigm, object-oriented programming, ubiquitous computing, electronic paper, amorphous silicon (a-Si) applications, the computer mouse, and advancing very-large-scale integration (VLSI) for semiconductors.
- Wi-Fi network – Alex Hills created the first wi-fi network using a local area network (LAN) on the Carnegie Mellon campus in 1993.

=== Companies and entrepreneurship ===
The Swartz Center for Entrepreneurship acts as Carnegie Mellon's startup accelerator. Jim Swartz, co-founder of Accel Partners, pledged $31 Million to establish a hub for university wide entrepreneurial activities. His gift is the fifth largest Carnegie Mellon has received. In 2016, the center opened providing a business incubator and makerspace. The center employs Entrepreneurs-in-Residence who mentor founders of early stage companies consisting of students, faculty, and alumni. Startups work on their ideas throughout the year culminating at an annual Demo Day where they showcase their company to the public.

Carnegie Mellon's alumni, faculty, and staff have founded many notable companies, some of which are shown below.

- Activision Blizzard, 1979 (as Activision), founding CEO Jim Levy (B.S., M.S.)
- Adobe Systems, 1982, co-founder Charles Geschke (Ph.D.)
- Sun Microsystems, 1982, co-founders Vinod Khosla (M.S.) and Andy Bechtolsheim (M.S.)
- Accel Partners, 1983, co-founder Jim Swartz (M.S.)
- NeXT, 1985, co-founding VP Engineering Avie Tevanian (M.S., Ph.D.)
- Transarc, 1989, co-founders Alfred Spector (Professor), Jeffrey Eppinger (B.S., M.S., Ph.D.), Mike Kazar (Ph.D.), Dean Thompson (B.S.)
- FORE Systems, 1990, co-founders Francois Bitz (B.S., M.S.), Onat Menzilcioglu (M.S., Ph.D.), Robert Sansom (Ph.D.) and Eric C. Cooper (Professor)
- Microsoft Research, 1991, founder Richard Rashid (Professor)
- IDEO, 1991, founder David M. Kelley (B.S.)
- Appaloosa Management, 1993, founder David Tepper (M.B.A)
- Red Hat, 1993, co-founder Marc Ewing (B.S.)
- Cognizant, 1994, co-founder Francisco D'Souza (M.B.A)
- Lycos, 1994, founder Michael Loren Mauldin (Ph.D.)
- Juniper Networks, 1996, founder Pradeep Sindhu (Ph.D.)
- Symphony Technology Group, 2002, founder Romesh Wadhwani (Ph.D.)
- Astrobotic Technology, 2007, founder Red Whittaker (M.S., Ph.D., Professor)
- YinzCam, 2009, founder Priya Narasimhan (Ph.D., Professor)
- Google X, 2010, co-founders Sebastian Thrun (Professor), Yoky Matsuoka (Professor), and Astro Teller (Ph.D.)
- Nest, 2010, co-founder Matt Rogers (B.S., M.S.)
- Duolingo, 2011, founders Luis von Ahn (Ph.D., Professor) & Severin Hacker (Ph.D.)
- Coursera, 2012, founder Andrew Ng (B.S.)
- Defense Innovation Unit, 2015, founder Maynard Holliday (B.S.)
- Argo AI, 2016, co-founder Peter Rander (M.S., Ph.D.)
- Nuro, 2016, co-founder Dave Ferguson (M.S., Ph.D.)
- Aurora Innovation, 2017, co-founder Chris Urmson (Ph.D.)

== Student life ==
Undergraduate student body composition 2024-2025
| Race and ethnicity | Total |
|---|---|
| Asian | 34.49% |
| White | 21.59% |
| Foreign national | 19.06% |
| Other (Note: Other consists of multiracial Americans & those who prefer to not say.) | 10.88% |
| Hispanic | 9.98% |
| Black | 4.00% |
Economic diversity
| Low-income (Note: The percentage of students who received an income-based federal Pell grant intended for low-income students.) | 16.04% |
| Affluent (Note: The percentage of students who are a part of the American middle class at the bare minimum.) | 83.96% |

Carnegie Mellon's student life includes over 400 student organizations, art galleries, and various unique traditions. Student organizations provide social, service, media, academic, spiritual, recreational, sport, religious, political, cultural, and governance opportunities. Carnegie Mellon's campus houses several exhibition spaces: the Ellis Gallery and the Frame Gallery are both dedicated to exhibiting the work of students and faculty, and the ICA Pittsburgh is the university's forum for contemporary art. The Carnegie Mellon School of Music, Carnegie Mellon School of Drama, and the student-run theatrical organization Scotch'n'Soda provides campus with a variety of performance arts events. The university has a strong Scottish motif inspired by Andrew Carnegie's Scottish heritage, as well as the Mellon family's Scots-Irish ancestry. Examples include Scotty, the Scottish Terrier mascot, The Tartan student newspaper, Skibo Gymnasium, The Thistle yearbook, and the Céilidh weekend every fall semester for homecoming.

=== Housing ===
Carnegie Mellon offers conventional housing for its students through single-gender, coresidential, and special interest options. Students can choose from a variety of housing options. The four options for students are traditional, semi-suite, suite, and apartments. The Traditional is a typical college dormitory setting, a long hallway with a series of 1-3 person rooms and a community bathroom shared with an entire floor or wing. Semi-Suite offers more privacy through 1-4 person rooms with 3-5 residents sharing one semi-private bathroom. Suite is similar to Semi-Suite but contains additional bedrooms, a bathroom, and living room/lounge area shared with 3-8 other residents. Apartments are shared between 1-3 people and may contain additional bedrooms, a semi-private bathroom, a living room, and kitchen shared with the other residents. Upperclassmen have additional options for housing, which include town houses and a larger variety of one or two bedroom apartments. There are 27 residential buildings on campus and even more off campus.

First-year students are assigned to the dedicated first-year residence halls on campus including Morewood E-Tower, Morewood Gardens, Residence on Fifth, Shirley Apartments, as well as Boss, Donner, Hamerschlag, McGill, Mudge, Scobell, and Stever Houses. Approximately one-third of upperclassmen choose to continue living on campus through university housing. Options for upperclassmen include Fifth & Clyde, Morewood Gardens, West Wing, Doherty, Fairfax, Margaret Morrison, Fifth Neville, Shady Oak, Shirley, Forbes & Beeler, and Woodlawn Apartments as well as Henderson, Resnik, Roselawn, Spirit, Tech, Webster, and Welch Houses.

=== Fraternities and sororities ===
The Greek tradition at Carnegie Mellon began over 100 years ago with the founding of the first fraternity on campus, Theta Xi, in 1912.

=== Specialized communities ===
In 2022, Welch House began to host the specialized Queer community, a living community suited to the needs of non-binary students by allowing students to "live in the same room with any other student inclusive of sex assigned at birth, gender identity, gender expression, and/or sexual orientation". Welch House consists of semi-suite singles and doubles. In addition, Stever House hosts an all-gender floor for students who would prefer a traditional double.

Spirit House is a residential community for upperclassmen designated for members of the SPIRIT student organization, a Black Student Union that serves as a haven for Black students within the Carnegie Mellon community and champions issues facing the Black community.

=== Traditions ===
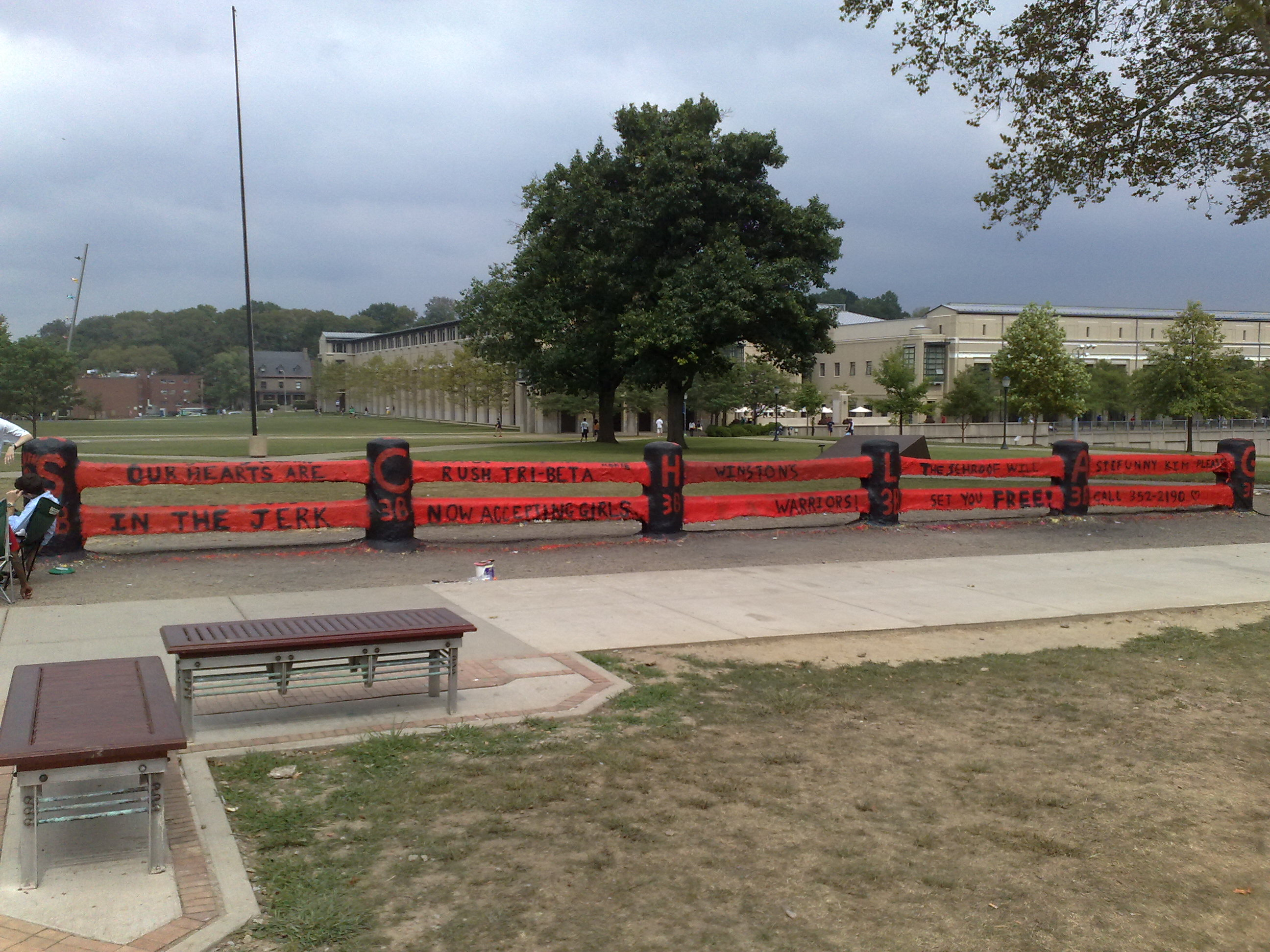
The Fence

In the early days of Carnegie Tech, there was a single bridge connecting Margaret Morrison Women's College with the Carnegie Institute of Technology. The bridge was a meeting place for students. In 1916, the bridge was taken down and the university filled in the area. The administration built a wooden fence as a new meeting place. The students did not understand why anyone would want to meet at a fence. The administration was about to give up and tear it down, but that night a fraternity, as a prank, painted the entire fence advertising a fraternity party. Ever since, painting the Fence has been a Carnegie Mellon tradition. The Fence at Carnegie Mellon lies at the center of campus, in the area known as "the Cut". Students guard the fence 24 hours a day, and, as long as two vigils are maintained, no other student may "take" the fence. The fence can then be painted by the group that has it, but only between midnight and 6 am. Only hand brushes may be used; the use of spray paint or paint rollers is considered vandalism and results in a fine. The previous paint cannot be stripped, and each new painting adds a new layer. The original wooden fence finally collapsed in the 1990s due to the weight from over 1' of surrounding paint, and was immediately replaced with an identical one manufactured from concrete. Today, the fence is considered "the world's most painted object" by the Guinness Book of World Records.

== Athletics ==
The Carnegie Mellon Tartans were a founding member of the University Athletic Association of NCAA Division III. Prior to World War II, Carnegie Mellon (as Carnegie Tech) played with what are now classified as NCAA Division I teams. In 1936, the Carnegie Tech riflery team won the national intercollegiate championship. The Carnegie Tech men's basketball team was a member of the Eastern Intercollegiate Conference throughout the conference's existence from 1932 to 1939 and won the conference championship in 1936, defeating Pittsburgh in a conference championship playoff game.

Carnegie Mellon tennis courts

Varsity teams are fielded in basketball, track, cross country, football, golf, soccer, swimming and diving, volleyball, tennis, and softball. In addition, club teams exist in ultimate frisbee, rowing, rugby, lacrosse, hockey, baseball, softball, skiing & snowboarding, soccer, volleyball, water polo, and cycling. Carnegie Mellon Athletics runs a comprehensive and popular intramural system, maintains facilities (primarily Skibo Gymnasium, Cohon University Center, Gesling Stadium, and the future Highmark Center for Health, Wellness and Athletics), and offers courses to students in fitness and sports. Carnegie Mellon's primary athletic rivals are fellow UAA schools Case Western Reserve University and Washington University in St. Louis; the Tartans had an especially intense rivalry with the latter's football team from the 2000s to 2017.

=== Football ===
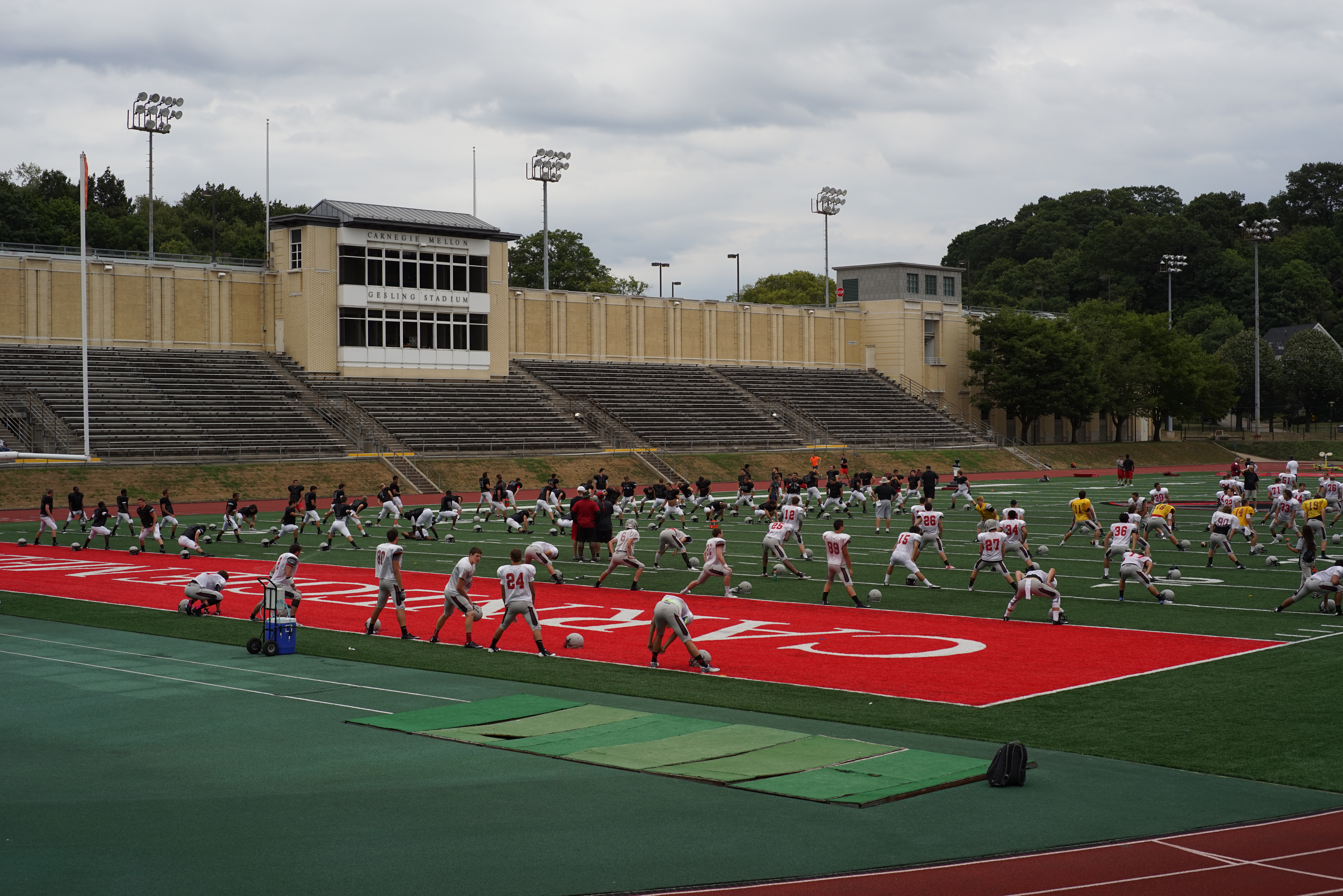
Football at Gesling Stadium

On November 28, 1926, the 6–2 Carnegie Technical Institute football team shut out the undefeated Notre Dame Fighting Irish 19–0 at Forbes Field. Knute Rockne, the coach of the Irish at the time, was so confident that the Irish would defeat "tiny Carnegie Tech" that he decided to skip the game and travel to Chicago to watch the Army-Navy football game for scouting purposes. It was only later that he found out by telegram that the Irish had suffered their first loss of the season. ESPN compared the upset to the Appalachian State victory over the University of Michigan in 2007. The game was ranked the fourth-greatest upset in college football history by ESPN.

Since 2025, the Tartans play in the Centennial Conference at the NCAA Division III level. The head coach of the football team is Ryan Larsen, who was the Presidents' Athletic Conference coach of the year in 2022. Prior to losing in the Sweet 16 of the 2022 D3 playoffs, the Tartans held a 17-game win streak which was, at the time, the longest win streak across all NCAA divisions in football.

=== Track and cross country ===
In recent years, the varsity track and cross country programs have seen outstanding success on the Division III national level. The men's cross country team has finished in the top 15 in the nation each of the last three years, and has boasted several individual All-Americans. The men's track team has also boasted several individual All-Americans spanning sprinting, distance, and field disciplines. Recent All-Americans from the track team are Bram Miller (2021), Tommy Vandenberg (2014–2015), Brian Harvey (2007–2009), Davey Quinn (2007), Nik Bonaddio (2004, 2005), Mark Davis (2004, 2005), Russel Verbofsky (2004, 2005) and Kiley Williams. Carolyn Lowe (10,000 meters 1992) is the only track athlete to win an NCAA Division III championship.

=== Volleyball ===
Lauren Schmidt received the NCAA Pennsylvania Woman of the Year award (2003), was a two-time All-American (2001 and 2002), a four-time All-University Athletic Association selection (1999–2002), and the conference's Player of the Year (2001).

=== Softball ===
The newest varsity team for Carnegie Mellon is the Softball team, with the first season in the spring of 2019. The team has already had 26 conference honors and has had success with bringing in dominant pitching with 2 players setting 12 records (Scotty McGee and Amanda Smith).

=== Intramurals ===
Students can participate in any level of competition across multiple sports including wiffle ball, dodgeball, basketball, flag football, ultimate frisbee and many more.

== Alumni and faculty ==
There are more than 117,000 Carnegie Mellon alumni worldwide with the graduating class of 2022. Alumni and current/former faculty include 21 Nobel laureates, six members of the National Academy of Medicine, 22 members of the National Academy of Sciences, 75 members of the National Academy of Engineering, two MacArthur Fellows, 24 Guggenheim Fellows, seven Packard fellows, 142 Emmy Award recipients (including ten time recipient Steven Bochco), 12 Academy Award recipients, 66 Tony Award recipients, two winners of the Stockholm Prize in Criminology, and 13 Turing Award recipients.

Alumni in the fine arts include artists Andy Warhol, Cote de Pablo, Philip Pearlstein, John Currin, Shalom Neuman, Jonathan Borofsky and Burton Morris; authors John-Michael Tebelak and Kurt Vonnegut; screenwriter Michael Goldenberg; television series creator Steven Bochco; actors René Auberjonois, Katy Mixon, Holly Hunter, Matt Bomer, and Zachary Quinto; children's author E.L. Konigsberg; Broadway actress Amanda Jane Cooper; Musician Leslie Odom Jr.; rock and Broadway theatre poster artist and graphic designer David Edward Byrd; Indian film actor Sushma Seth; Boston Pops conductor Keith Lockhart; mountaineer and author Aron Ralston.

Alumni in the sciences include Charles Geschke, co-founder and chairman of Adobe Systems; Stephanie Kwolek, inventor of Kevlar; James Gosling, creator of the Java programming language, Andy Bechtolsheim, co-founder of Sun Microsystems; David Kelley, co-founder of IDEO; George Pake, founder of Xerox PARC; Marc Ewing, co-founder of Red Hat; Jim Levy, founding CEO of Activision; billionaire hedge fund investor and owner of the Carolina Panthers of the National Football League David Tepper; Scott Fahlman, creator of the emoticon; Chris Messina, creator of the hashtag; tech executive and entrepreneur Kai-Fu Lee; and astronauts Edgar Mitchell (Apollo 14) and Judith Resnik, who perished in the Space Shuttle Challenger disaster. John Forbes Nash, a 1948 graduate and winner of the 1994 Nobel Memorial Prize in Economics, was the subject of the book and subsequent film A Beautiful Mind. Alan Perlis, a 1943 graduate, was a pioneer in programming languages and recipient of the first Turing Award. Structural engineer Mao Yisheng, considered the father of modern bridge engineering in China, earned the first Ph.D. ever granted by the Carnegie Institute of Technology (now Carnegie Mellon University).

Alumni in politics include U.S. Representatives Susie Lee and Sydney Kamlager-Dove, Puerto Rican politician Carmen Yulín Cruz, Federal Reserve Bank of Chicago President Charles L. Evans, Allegheny County Executive Rich Fitzgerald, and former General Motors CEO and Secretary of Defense, Charles Erwin Wilson.

== In popular culture ==
The campus of Carnegie Mellon in Pittsburgh has served as the locale for many motion pictures. Alumnus George A. Romero filmed Creepshow (1982) in and around Margaret Morrison Carnegie Hall. Campus scenes in the 2000 film Wonder Boys, starring Michael Douglas and Tobey Maguire, were filmed in Carnegie Mellon's campus.

The musical Pippin was originally conceived by Stephen Schwartz as a student musical performed by the Scotch'n'Soda student theatre troupe. Schwartz also collaborated with drama student John-Michael Tebelak to expand his master's thesis project titled Godspell, created under the direction of Lawrence Carra, into a musical.

While enrolled at Carnegie Mellon, acting students Michael McKean and David Lander (class of 1969) created the characters "Lenny and Squiggy". The pair continued performing the characters in live comedy routines before joining the cast of the TV series Laverne & Shirley.

In 2008, Carnegie Mellon professor Randy Pausch's "Last Lecture" became a pop culture phenomenon. Based on a lecture he gave in September 2007 – shortly after he learned his cancer had metastasized – his book quickly rose to the top of bestseller lists around the country. Named in Time magazine's Time 100 list of influential people, he died in July 2008 from pancreatic cancer.

== See also ==
- Association of American Universities
- Association of Independent Technological Universities
- List of Carnegie Mellon University people
- List of Carnegie Mellon University traditions
