= Newell Simon Hall =

- Interactive map of the Newell Simon Hall area

General information
- Type: Academic
- Location: Pittsburgh, PA
- Coordinates: 40.44343°N 79.945589°W
- Current tenants: Human-Computer Interaction Institute; Robotics Institute; Quality of Life Technology Center

Technical details
- Floor count: 6

Newell Simon Hall is in the northwestern part of the Carnegie Mellon campus named after the late Herbert A. Simon and Allen Newell. It was built atop two earlier buildings (Buildings C and D) acquired from the United States Bureau of Mines.
