= Carnegie Mellon University Africa =

University in Rwanda

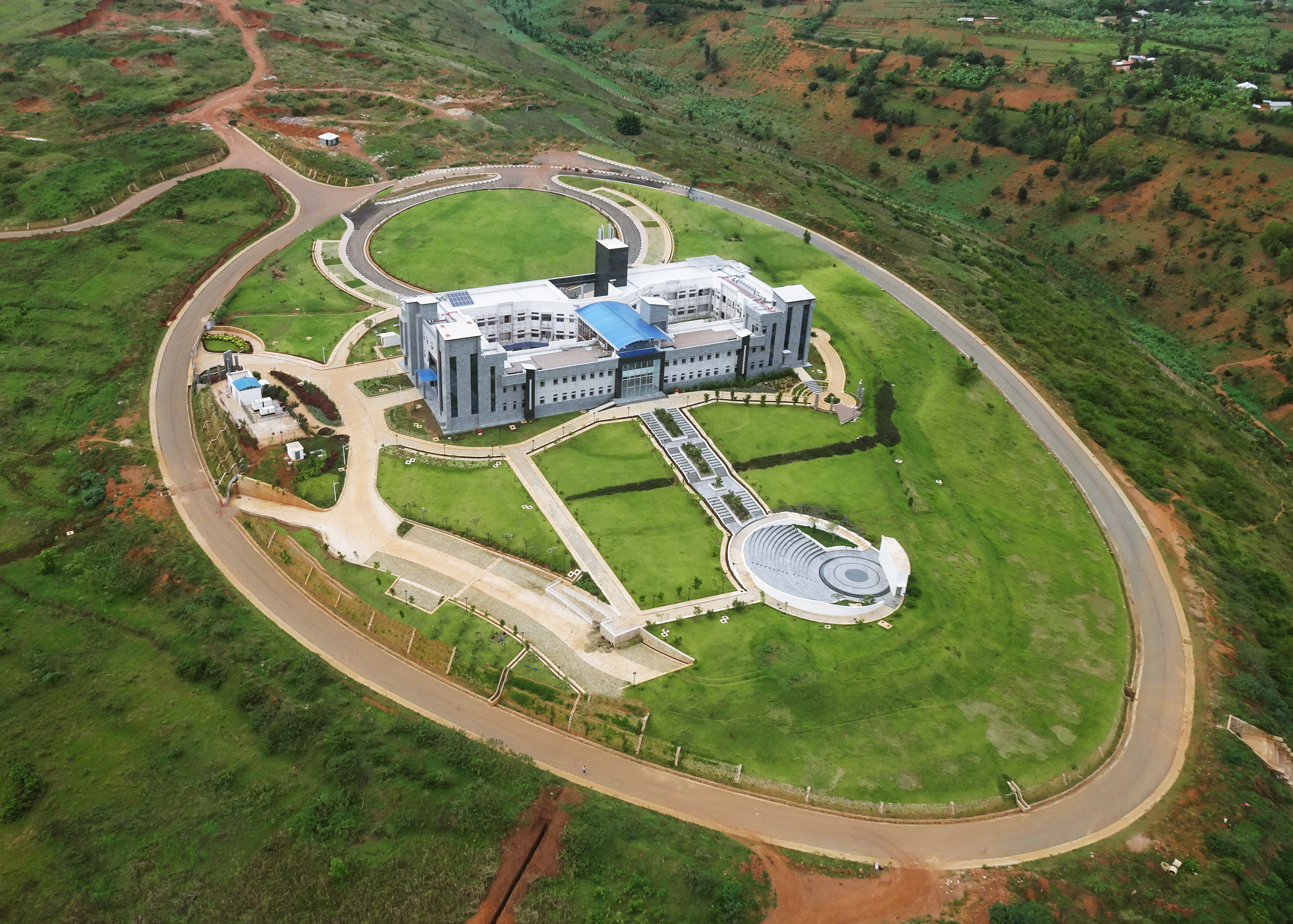
- Type: Private graduate engineering school
- Established: 2011
- Director: Conrad Tucker
- Address: Regional ICT Center of Excellence Bldg Kigali Innovation City - Bumbogo BP 6150, Kigali, Rwanda, Kigali, Rwanda; 1.935111°S 30.158601°E
- Website: africa.engineering.cmu.edu
- Location in Rwanda

Carnegie Mellon University Africa (CMU-Africa) is an overseas campus of the College of Engineering of Carnegie Mellon University, located in Kigali Innovation City in Kigali, Rwanda, East Africa.

== History ==
In 2011, Carnegie Mellon University and the government of Rwanda signed an agreement to establish a new Carnegie Mellon location in Kigali to respond to the shortage of engineers.

On September 8, 2022, the Mastercard Foundation announced a $275.7 million donation to Carnegie Mellon University, with $175 million going to Carnegie Mellon University-Africa's endowment and $100.7 million going to grow and establish technological universities throughout Africa.

== Academics ==
Carnegie Mellon University-Africa offers master's degrees in information technology, electrical and computer engineering, and engineering artificial intelligence. As of 2024, Carnegie Mellon University-Africa has over 300 students and 550 alumni from 19 different nationalities.
