= Carnegie Mellon University Miami =

Carnegie Mellon University Miami News

Carnegie Mellon University announced in September 2026 that the university would build a 35-acre campus in Miami’s Wynwood neighborhood, backed by a $2 billion allocation from billionaire Ken Griffin's historic $3 billion gift to the university. The location is the former Mana Wynwood property along Northwest 23rd Street in Wynwood, Miami, which was purchased in a $1.1 billion real estate deal. Jignesh Patel was announced as founding dean of Carnegie Mellon University Miami.
