= Lawrence Carra =

- Born: 1909; Salina, Italy
- Died: March 30, 2006 (aged 96–97); Pittsburgh, Pennsylvania
- Occupations: American drama professor and director of theatre and television

Lawrence Carra (1909–March 30, 2006) was an American professor of drama at Carnegie Mellon University in Pittsburgh, Pennsylvania, USA. He was a director of theater and television as well as a mentor to hundreds of actors and directors.

== Background ==
Carra (pronounced cuh-RAH) was born in Salina, Italy. His parents immigrated to Boston, Massachusetts, in 1912, where they started a grocery business. One of his high school teachers arranged for a full scholarship to Harvard University, where he studied biology. He was active in the Harvard drama club and graduated in 1931.

He attended medical school in Rome for one year, but his passion for theater caused him to return to the States and to enroll in Yale University's drama school, from which he graduated in 1935. At Yale he was a research assistant for Professor Alexander Dean on the first edition of his classic textbook The Fundamentals of Play Directing. Carra assumed the role of co-author after Dean's death in 1939. More than sixty years later, the book is in its fifth edition and still is widely used in colleges.

Carra taught directing at Northwestern University and the University of Texas at Austin before joining the drama school of Carnegie Tech, now Carnegie Mellon University, in 1947. He eventually became the department chairman.

His directing students at CMU included William Ball, founder of American Conservatory Theater; Steven Bochco, creator of the hit TV series Hill Street Blues, LA Law, and NYPD Blue; Mel Shapiro, who co-wrote and directed the musical adaptation of Two Gentlemen of Verona on Broadway; and John-Michael Tebelak, creator of the popular musical Godspell.

He died at age 97 on March 30, 2006, at his Squirrel Hill home in Pittsburgh and is buried at Homewood Cemetery.
