= Integrated Innovation Institute =

Unit of Carnegie Mellon University

- Established: 2014
- Affiliations: Carnegie Institute of Technology, Carnegie Mellon College of Fine Arts, Carnegie Mellon University, Tepper School of Business
- Director: Eric Anderson, Peter Boatwright, Jonathan Cagan
- Location: 4612 Forbes Avenue, Pittsburgh, PA, United States
- Campus: Urban
- Website: http://www.cmu.edu/integrated-innovation/

The Integrated Innovation Institute, founded in 2014 at Carnegie Mellon University, is a joint initiative of the College of Engineering, the College of Fine Arts, and the Tepper School of Business.

== Degrees ==
The Integrated Innovation Institute offers several professional master's degrees:

- Master of Integrated Innovation for Products and Services (Pittsburgh campus, founded in 2003)
- Master of Science in Software Management (Silicon Valley, founded in 2004)
- Master of Science in Technology Ventures (Bi-costal, also dual degree, founded 2016)

== Directors and Faculty ==
The faculty of the Integrated Innovation Institute are drawn from a variety of departments at Carnegie Mellon University.

=== Directors and Founders ===
- Eric Anderson (Associate Professor of Industrial Design, School of Design)
- Peter Boatwright (Carnegie Bosch Professor of Marketing, Tepper School of Business)
- Jonathan Cagan (George Tallman and Florence Barrett Ladd Professor in Engineering, Department of Mechanical Engineering)

=== Executive in Residence ===
- Donna Sturgess (President & Founding Partner of Buyology Inc.)

=== Faculty ===
- Dimitrios Apostolopoulos (Senior Systems Scientist, National Robotics Engineering Center)
- Daragh Byrne (Special Intel Faculty, College of the Fine Arts)
- Lloyd Corder (Adjunct Professor of Marketing, Tepper School of Business)
- Tim Cunningham (Adjunct Faculty, School of Design)
- Drew Degentesh (Adjunct Faculty, Department of Mechanical Engineering)
- Stuart Evans (Distinguished Service Professor, Carnegie Mellon Silicon Valley)
- Francine Gemperle (Adjunct Faculty, Integrated Innovation Institute)
- Bruce Hanington (Associate Professor, School of Design)
- Tom Kubilius (Adjunct Faculty, School of Design)
- John Lankford (Adjunct Professor of Marketing, Tepper School of Business)
- Paolo Malabuyo (Adjunct Faculty, Carnegie Mellon Silicon Valley)
- Ole Mengshoel (Associate Research Professor, Carnegie Mellon Silicon Valley)
- Gladys Mercier (Director, Software Management Program, Carnegie Mellon Silicon Valley)
- Sheryl Root (Associate Professor, Software Management, Carnegie Mellon Silicon Valley)
- Ravi Thomas (Instructor, Software Management, Carnegie Mellon Silicon Valley)
- Noe Vargas-Hernandez (Associate Teaching Professor, Department of Mechanical Engineering)
- Tony Wasserman (Professor, Software Management Practice, Carnegie Mellon Silicon Valley)
- Matthew Zywica (Visiting assistant professor, School of Design)

== Social Innovation ==
In addition to industry-sponsored projects, the Integrated Innovation Institute has chartered projects that aim to solve social issues. In spring 2014, two course project teams applied the integrated product development process to solve the problem of sexual assault. In spring 2015, Integrated Innovation Institute students produced a prototype cold-weather homeless shelter as part Carnegie Mellon's Impact-a-Thon competition.
