= Margaret Morrison Carnegie College =

Former women's college for Carnegie Mellon University

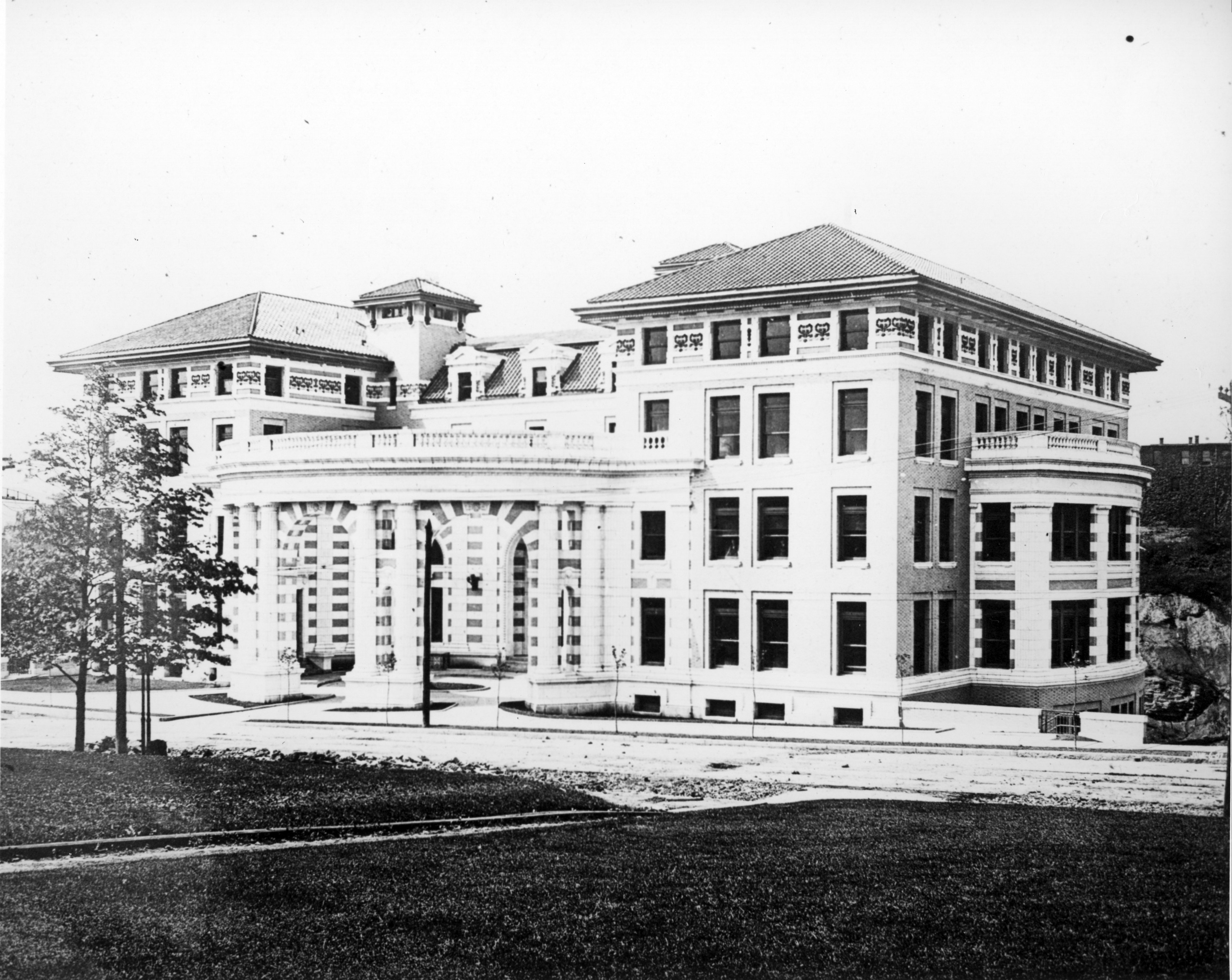
ca 1910-1920

Margaret Morrison Carnegie College (MMCC) was the women's college for Carnegie Mellon University. It was founded in 1903 and opened its doors to students in 1906 as the Margaret Morrison Carnegie School for Women. The school was closed in 1973.

== Founding and early history ==
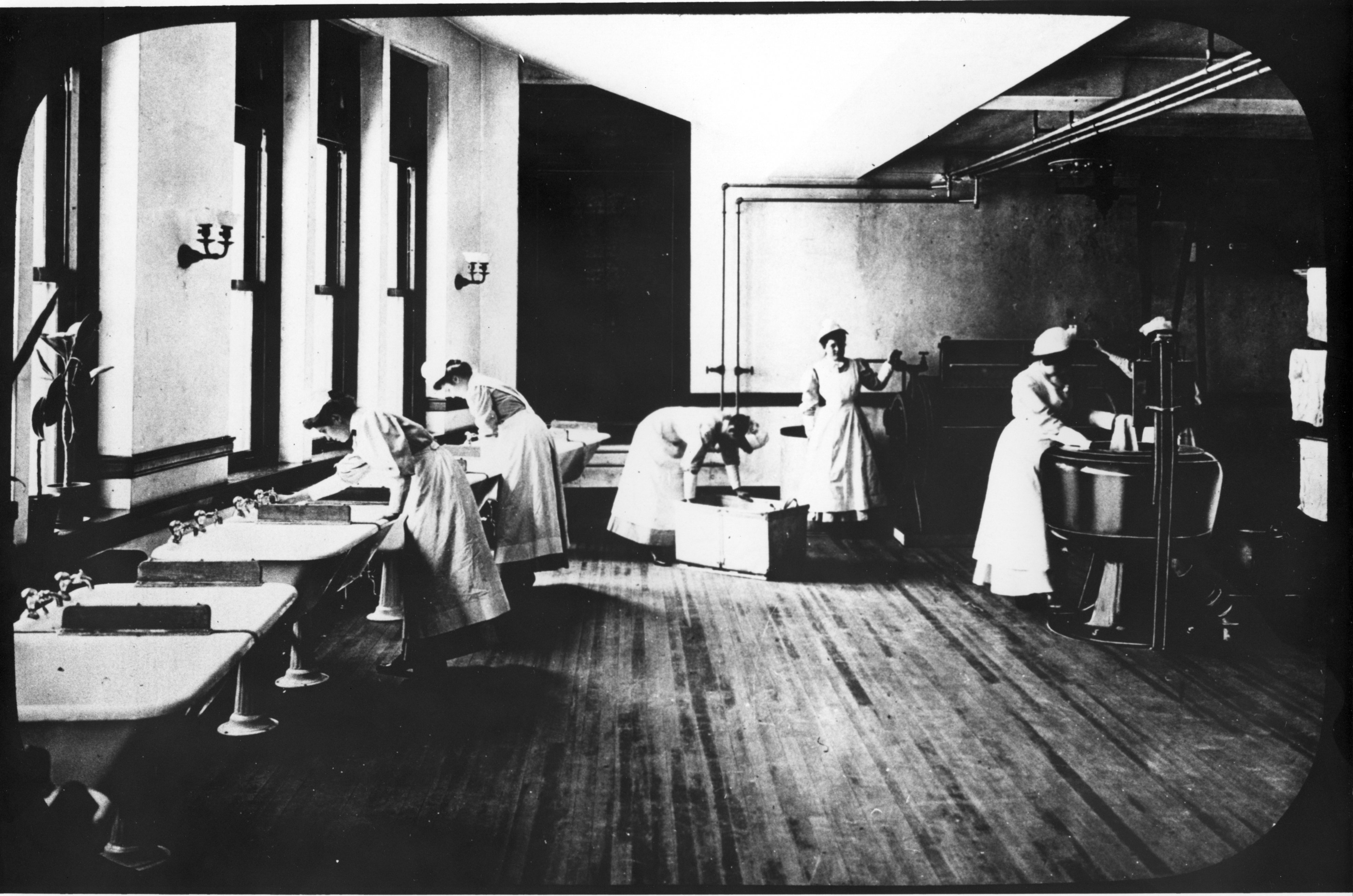
Laundry laboratory

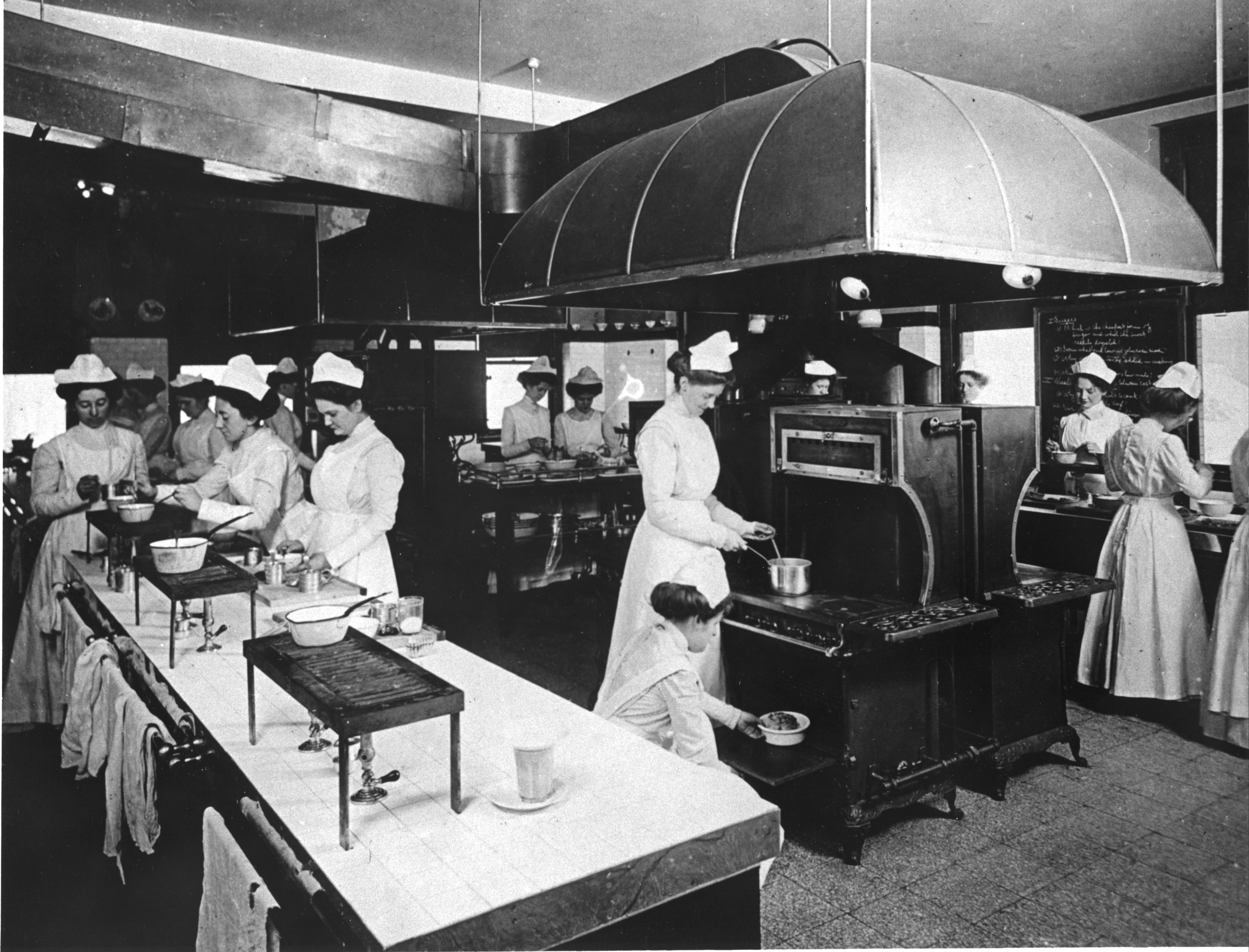
Dietetics laboratory

Photos ca 1910-1920

MMCC was founded in 1903 as one of the four colleges of the Carnegie Institute of Technology (Carnegie Tech). Andrew Carnegie, the founder of Carnegie Tech, named the college after his mother. MMCC's principal aim would be to train young women to earn their livelihood.

The curriculum in the first year included principles of science and economics, history, English, accounts, social ethics, sewing, drawing, cookery, and personal hygiene. In their second and third years, students could choose to specialize in secretarial courses, household arts and institutional management, technical dressmaking, costume design, applied design, or architectural and interior decoration.

Of the goals of the college, Eileen McConomy, steering committee chairperson of the MMCC Centennial, stated, "although some of the major disciplines available to us may seem archaic to current students, for our era they were relevant [...] our education was rigorous. Our women professors were the forerunners of the feminist movement and inspired us to take charge of our lives, to not be afraid to speak out for what we believed was right, and to demand excellence in all that we did."

== Closing ==
Margaret Morrison Carnegie College closed in 1973 due to declining enrollment: "Entering on the coattails of the 1950s were societal and institutional changes that would ultimately seal the fate of MMCC. Homemaking was less apt to be considered a profession; women students were turning increasingly to careers based in the liberal arts and sciences. A steadily climbing enrollment in these fields led to the integration of many MMCC programs into Tech’s other schools."

== Legacy ==
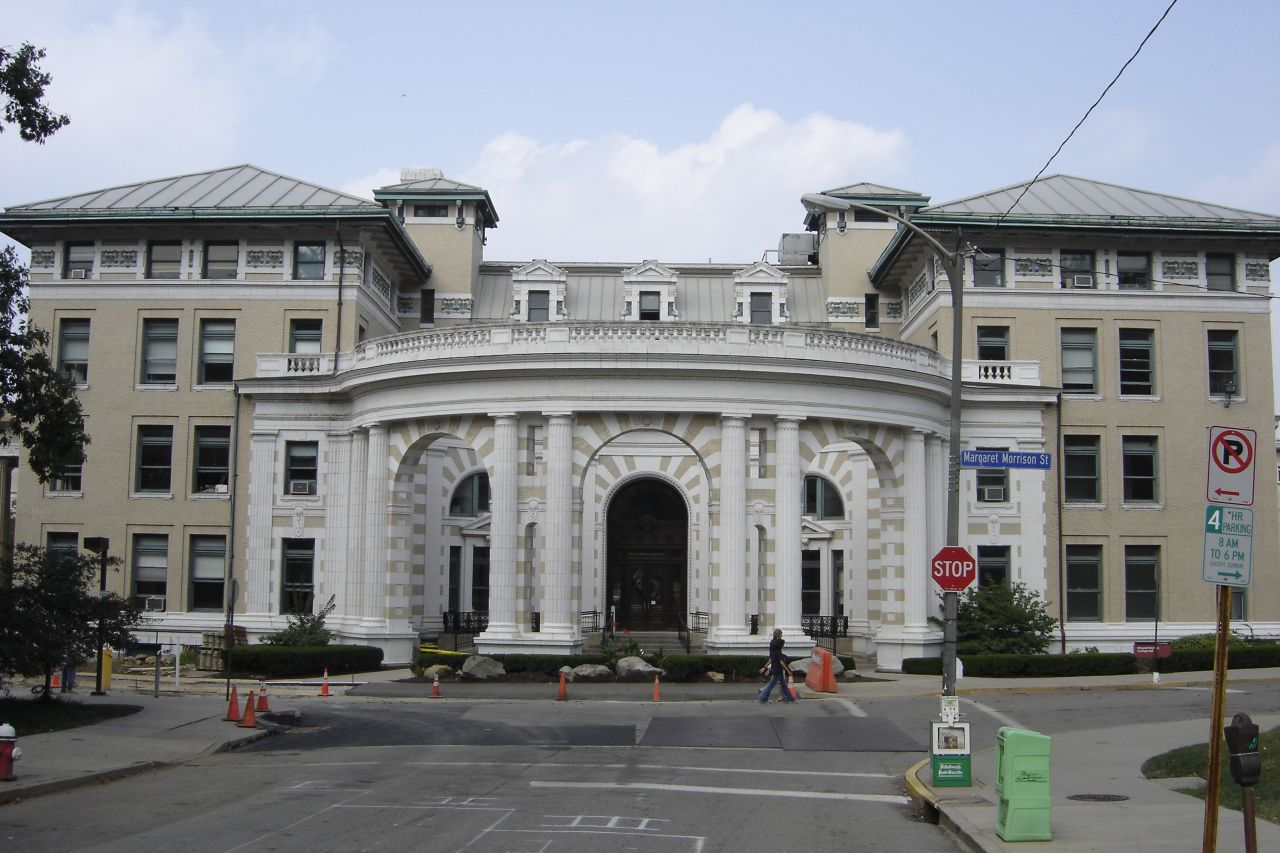
Margaret Morrison Carnegie Hall

The end of Margaret Morrison Carnegie College also marked the beginning of the College of Humanities and Social Sciences (now known as the Dietrich College of Humanities and Social Sciences), and several programs and departments were absorbed into the new college as well as the Mellon College of Science and College of Fine Arts. Margaret Morrison Street runs through the west end of the campus. The Margaret Morrison Apartments and the Margaret Morrison Courtyard are located along the street. Margaret Morrison Carnegie Hall serves as the headquarters of the Carnegie Mellon School of Design and a principal facility of the Carnegie Mellon College of Fine Arts. In 2006, a dining facility called the Maggie Murph Café was opened within Hunt Library, the main library at Carnegie Mellon University.

== Notable alumnae ==
Alumnae of the college are known as Maggie Murphs. Stephanie Kwolek, the inventor of Kevlar, graduated from Margaret Morrison Carnegie College in 1946 with a B.S. in General Science (Chemistry). Newbery Medal winning-author E. L. Konigsburg is a 1952 graduate of Margaret Morrison Carnegie College.
