= Carnegie Mellon University traditions =

Carnegie Mellon University is home to a variety of unique traditions, some of which date back to the early days of its over 100-year history. Many of these traditions hearken to the university's strength in engineering, such as the buggy races and the mobots, while others are purely social in nature, such as Spring Carnival and The Fence.

== Alma Mater ==
"Alma Mater - Carnegie Mellon University"

Song
- Written: 1924
- Genre: Alma mater
- Composer: J. Vick O'Brien
- Lyricist: Charles J. Taylor

The alma mater of Carnegie Mellon University was written by Charles J. Taylor and set to music by J. Vick O'Brien when the university was still named Carnegie Institute of Technology. The song was copyrighted by the institute in 1924.

While not used as much as alma maters at some other universities, the song plays a vital role in the culture and history of Carnegie Mellon University. It is sung at convocation ceremonies of incoming classes, commencement ceremonies of graduating classes, and other official events such as the investiture of new presidents. The university's Kiltie Band plays it at certain home games.

=== Verses ===
==== First Verse ====
The first verse references the history of Pittsburgh, Pennsylvania where the university is located. In the late-18th Century, after the United States won its independence, the settlement at the present city of Pittsburgh was known as the frontier and the Gateway to the West. The verse describes the wilderness through which the westward-bound settlers traversed to reach their goal. The verse concludes with the proud allusion that Carnegie Mellon was founded by Andrew Carnegie.

Here where spangled wildernesses
Robed the fountains of the west,
Where the savage strife and stresses
Brought the settlers' crimson quest;
Land of legend, glory graces,
Gypsy tide and toiling shore,
'Mid thy hilltops Alma Mater
Stands enthroned forever more.
All Hail Carnegie Alma Mater
Stands enthroned forever more.

==== Second Verse ====
The second verse begins with Pittsburgh's role at the nation's inception. It references the history of the labor movement through the Antebellum Era and Gilded Age. Upon its founding in 1900, Andrew Carnegie had intended the university to be a vocational school for the children of the workers in his steel mills. As the university progressed, it embraced the arts as exemplified by the Carnegie Mellon School of Drama, the first degree-granting program in the country, while continuing to focus on its technical and scientific education. The university maintains a strong collaborative culture among its constituent colleges ranging from the arts to the sciences.

Here was heard the musket's rattle,
'Round us roll'd the thralling drum
All is hush'd, no more they startle,
Now we hear sweet labor's hum,
Art and science rule our battle,
In their pathway honor lies.
Hail Carnegie Alma Mater
Show the way that truth may rise!
All Hail Carnegie Alma Mater
Show the way that truth may rise!

==== Third Verse ====
The last verse references the university's dedication to academic excellence and high-quality teaching, alluding to its continued pursuit of collecting and disseminating knowledge.

Show the way arouse, awaken,
Bear aloft the beacon bright,
That our minds be ever taken,
Unto learning, into light.
Stand in daytime's storm unshaken,
Guide thro'storm of deepest night.
Hail Carnegie Alma Mater
Stand for progress, peace and right.
All Hail Carnegie Alma Mater
Stand for progress, peace and right!

== The Fence ==
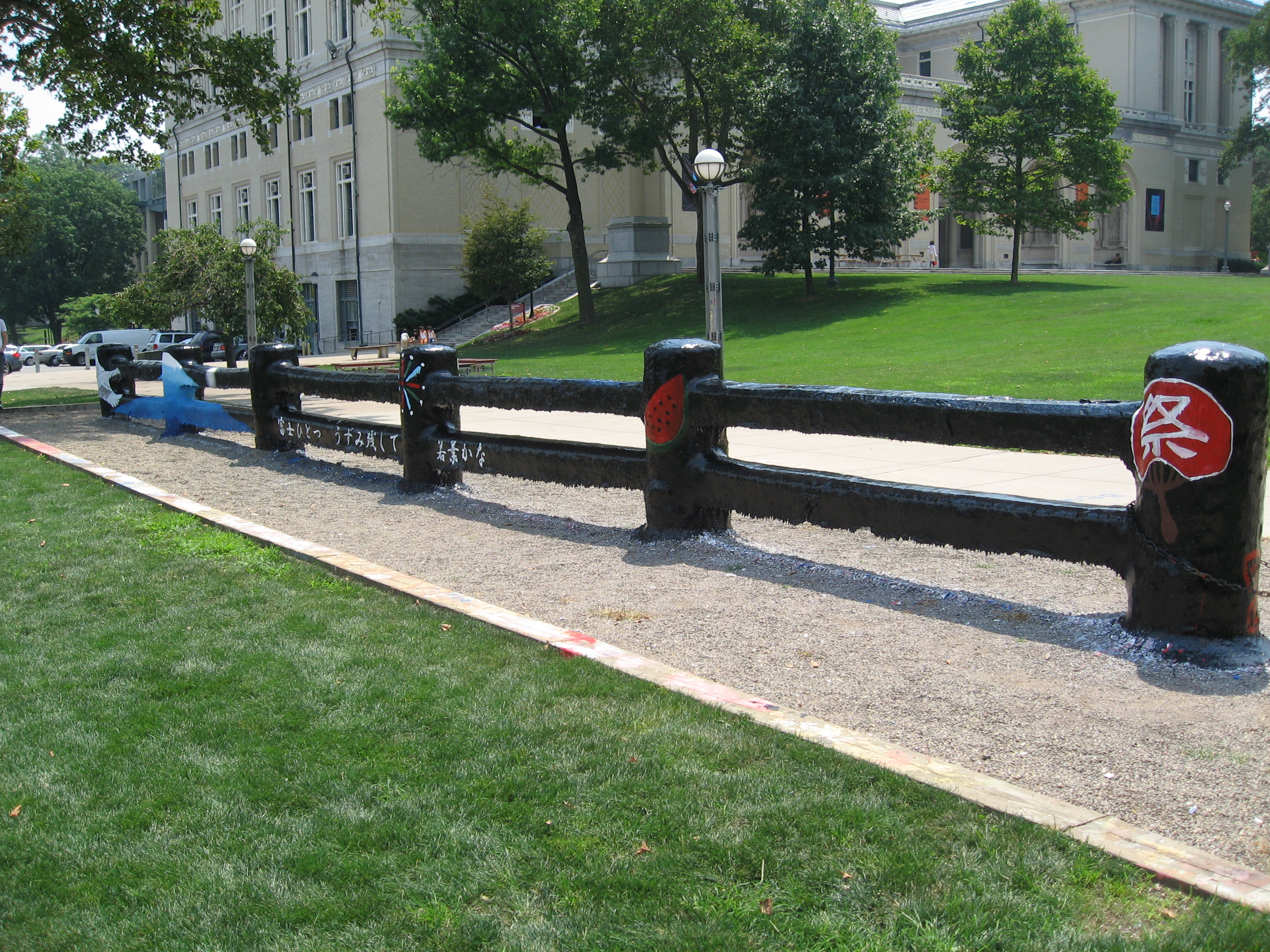
The Fence, 2006

The Fence, built in 1923, which lies in the middle of the Cut. The Fence frequently displays witty or poignant messages, but is just as often used to advertise upcoming events or recent accomplishments. Because of its highly visible location on campus, it is an ideal place to proclaim one's message to as much of the student body as possible. The original wooden fence was replaced in 1993 when it collapsed under its own weight due to six inches of surrounding paint. At the time, it held the Guinness World Record for being the most painted object. Today, a concrete and steel reinforced fence stands where the original one stood, imitating the size it would be today. Students still paint the fence in an effort to break the record held by the original as the world's most painted upon object. As of 2017 the fence has four inches of paint.

In August 2008, the graduating class of 2008 at the Carnegie Mellon Silicon Valley Campus brought the tradition to California by installing their own version of the fence, and dedicating it to Randy Pausch, who died in that year.

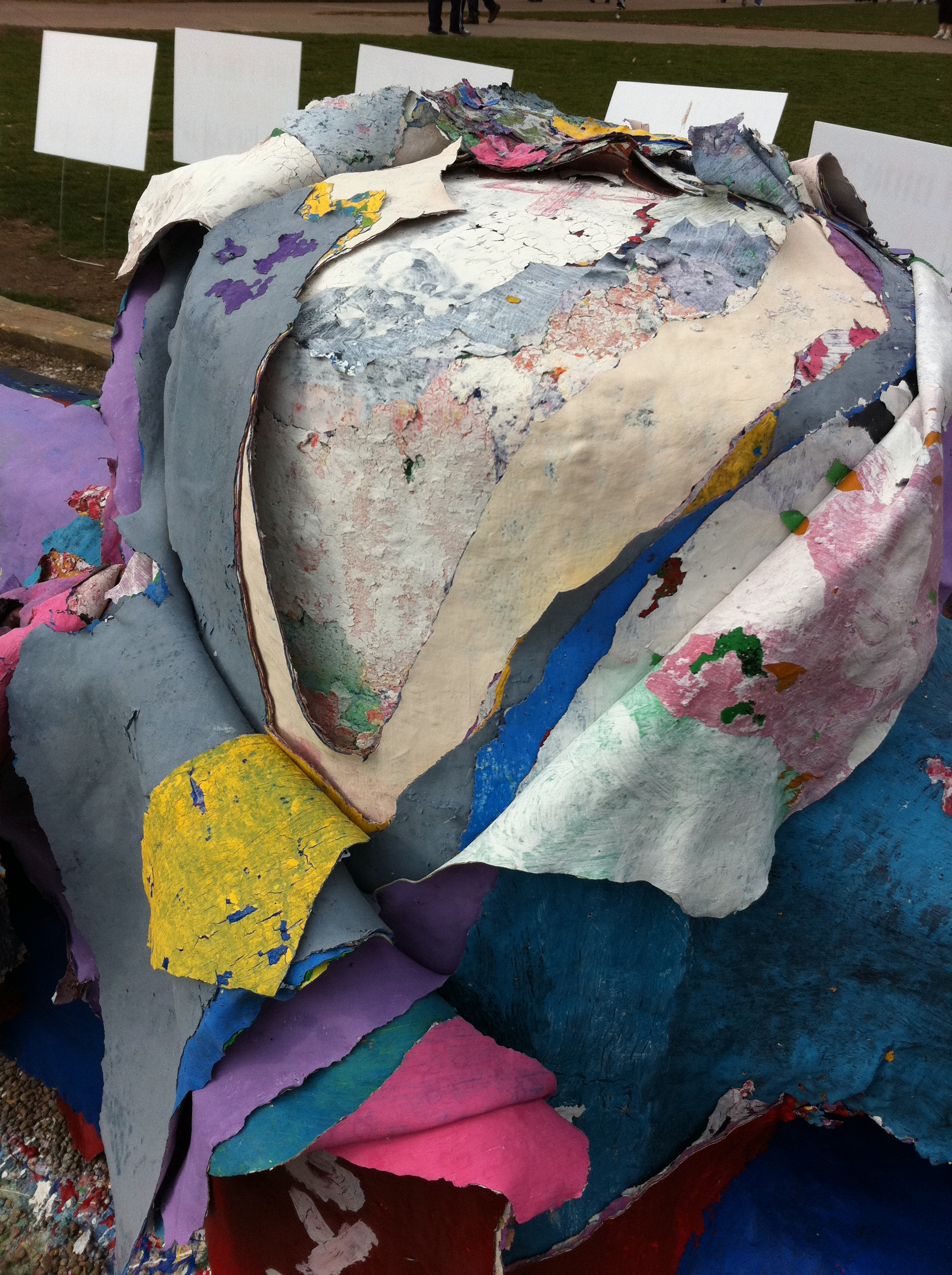
Two years of paint layers are visible after the defacing.

On March 21, 2011, six freshman Carnegie Mellon students defaced the fence. They were stopped by fellow students, CMU Police Officers, and representatives from the Office of Student Affairs. A hacksaw was used to cut away over two years' worth of layers of paint. The following night, hundreds of CMU students helped paint the fence in an effort to "heal" it. Facilities Management Services has taken the responsibility of repairing the fence. Instead of gluing it back together, the chunks were removed on March 23, leaving dozens of different layers visible.

The Fence is used not only to advertise upcoming events for a variety of organizations, but also to recognize different political views, religious or ethnic holidays, as well as support those on campus that may feel underrepresented.

In 2026, multiple organizations including the American Association of University Professors, Coalition for Higher Education, Concerned Jewish Faculty and Staff, Institute for the Critical Study of Zionism, Jewish Voice for Peace, Palestine Legal, and the Sunrise Movement called for the university to drop an investigation into students for pro-Palestinian messages on The Fence.

== Spring Carnival ==
Usually held in April, Spring Carnival is the biggest event of the Carnegie Mellon school year. Students have a four-day weekend. Many students work hard all year to make it a success; it is open to the Pittsburgh community. Alumni often return for the festivities, and Reunion coincides with the weekend. Spring Carnival features "Midway", with all the standard carnival attractions, and a Buggy race which is run over the course of the weekend. Many organizations across campus construct both a booth for Midway and a buggy for Sweepstakes.

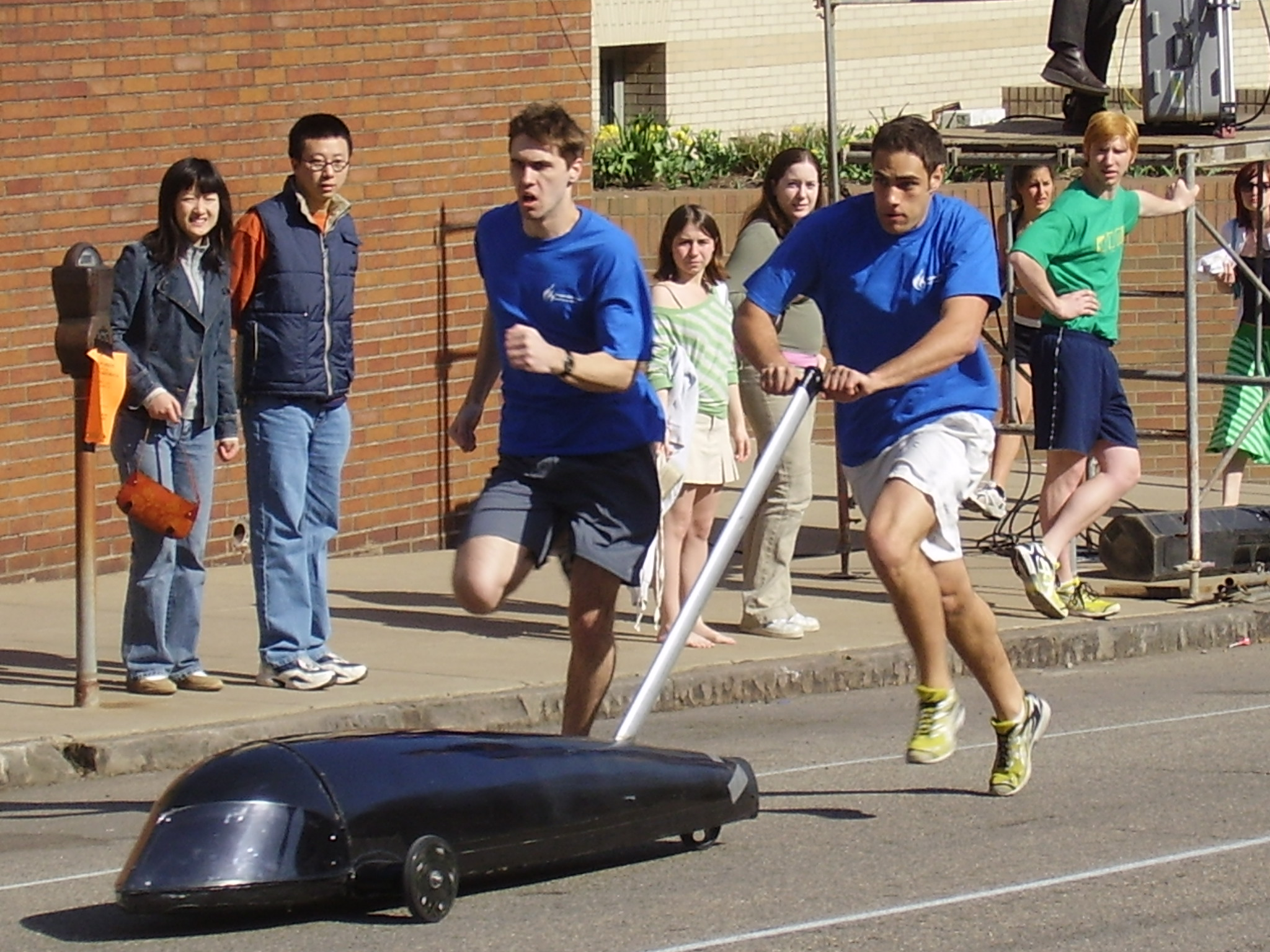
Two pushers exchange the buggy for Kappa Delta Rho on the first hill of Sweepstakes.

=== Buggy races ===
Buggy, officially called Sweepstakes, is a race around Schenley Park. It can be thought of as a relay race with five runners, using the buggy vehicle as the baton. Entrants submit a small, usually torpedo-shaped, vehicle that is pushed uphill and then allowed to free-roll downhill. The driver (who—like all participants—must be a Carnegie Mellon student, and is almost always short, light, and female) lies down inside the vehicle with the steering and brake controls. The vehicles are completely unpowered, including the prohibition of energy storing devices such as flywheels. Brakes are required but generally rarely used. Often, brakes are applied only as a last resort to prevent a crash, or to slow the buggy at the finish for the pusher to catch up because the rules specify that the pusher must be in contact with buggy at the finish line or be disqualified. Drivers who have been forced to apply the brakes due to another driver cutting them off may appeal for a re-roll in another heat without penalty. The second-to-last corner of the race, a sharp 110-degree right turn, is affectionately called "The Chute" and is lined with hay bales to prevent potential driver and spectator injury. Speeds can be quite high in the chute, often in the vicinity of 35 mph. Student Dormitory Council (SDC) holds the current men's record of 2:02.16 and the current women's record of 2:23.27, both set in 2017.

For many years extensive experimentation and innovation evolved buggy designs. Prior to 1980 the primary format used 4 wheels in a symmetrical layout with respect to the direction of travel. Exceptions to this did occur with both 3-wheeled buggies and 2-wheeled "bikes" being entered on occasion. Since 1980, new materials, braking systems and wheel orientations provided significant opportunity for experimentation. Alignment of wheels received particular attention. The first successful 3 wheeled buggies were developed in the early 80s led by Pi Kappa Alpha (PiKA) and Sigma Nu. Development of two wheeled buggies by Delta Upsilon from 1986–1989 continued the theme of wheel alignment. In 1988, Delta Upsilon broke the course record with a time of 2:08.5 – a record that stood only briefly as SPIRIT surpassed that time later that day and further lowered the record time the following day. Two wheeled buggies were later eliminated from competition for safety reasons through modifications to the rules.

PiKA and SPIRIT took every Sweepstakes championship from 1986 until 2000 when SDC won the women's race and 2001 when Fringe won the men's race. PiKA continued its success in the 2000s, setting the consecutive wins record by winning for seven years in a row (2002–2008). SDC took the title in the men's race in 2009 breaking PiKA's streak and setting a new record. Fringe took the men's title in 2010 after a dominant SDC was removed from competition due to an alleged fire safety violation. Fringe took the men's title again in 2011 in beating SDC A by 1 second, with SDC B and C teams taking 3rd and 4th, while SDC reclaimed the Women's title. The defending men's champion is SDC with eight consecutive wins from 2012 through 2019, which is the record for most wins in a row. The current women's title is also held by SDC (2017, 2018 and 2019).

Live media coverage of the Sweepstakes races has historically been provided by WRCT-FM, the school's student-run radio station. In recent years, campus television station cmuTV has broadcast live video coverage of the races with commentary from WRCT-FM. In the fall of 2008 the Buggy Alumni Association was founded to preserve the history of the sport, assist with keeping alumni connected to the event and assist the current students in maintaining the race's continuing existence. The race videos are available on DVD from cmuTV after the races end.

=== Midway ===
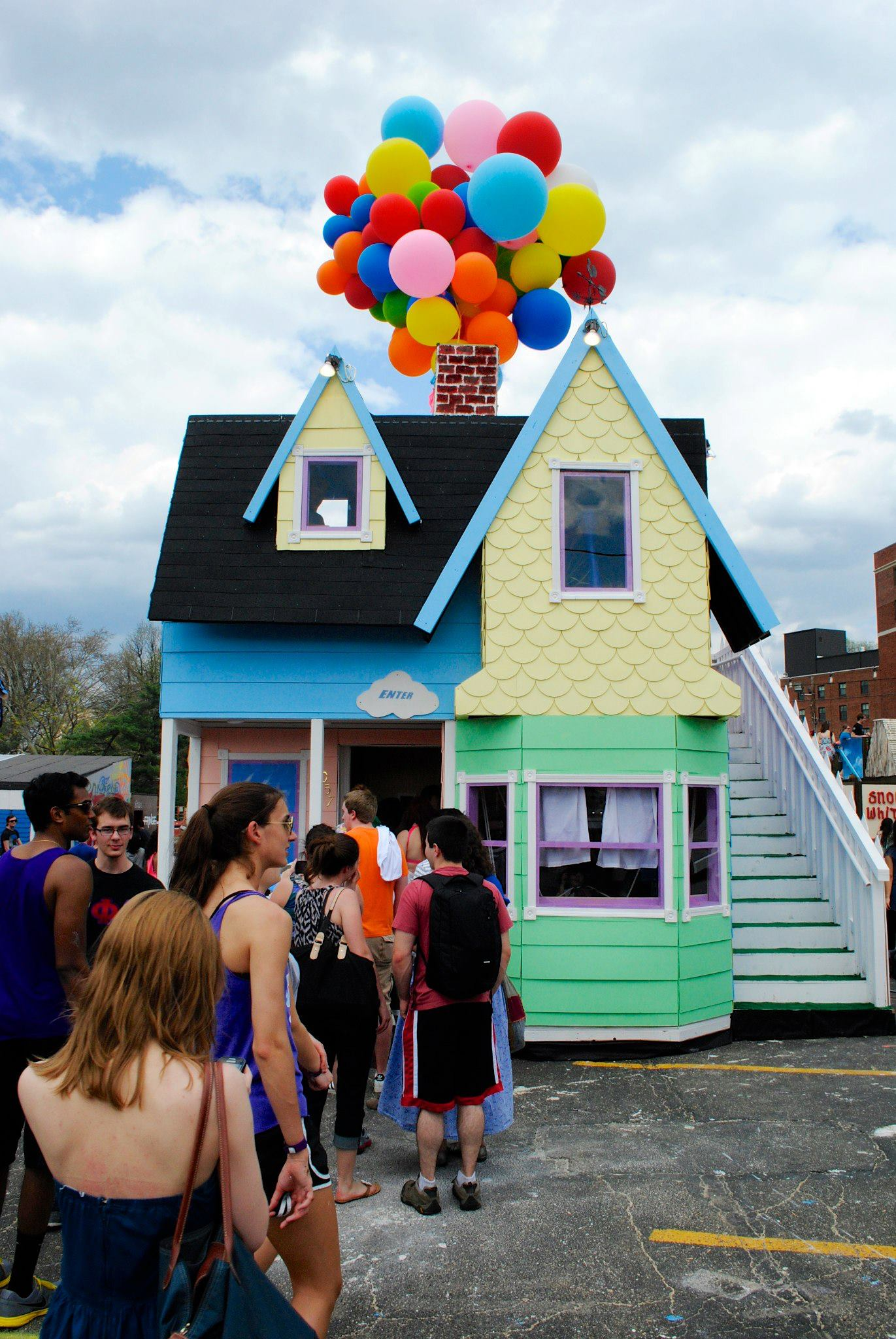
A booth in Carnegie Mellon University's 2013 Booth Competition, a part of the spring Carnival

For Carnival Weekend, the College of Fine Arts parking lot is turned into "Midway." Midway features both booths and carnival rides. Booths are multi-story structures constructed by campus organizations, featuring (usually) free games and cheap giveaway prizes. The booths are intricate, multi-level affairs, showing off the creativity and energy of the students who construct them. The Friday of the week before Carnival is known as "Move On", and is when all the organizations who are building booths move their supplies, materials, tools, and pre-fabricated components onto Midway. Build week commences from that Friday night, and for the entire week, organizations steadfastly build their booths, preparing for the official opening of Midway at 3:00 pm the following Thursday. Each year, an overall theme for booths is chosen. Booth has four competitive categories. These include: fraternity, sorority, independent, and blitz (smaller booths). Each organization chooses a sub-theme and builds their booth accordingly. The construction of these booths is a competition and each booth is judged on various criteria, including both daytime and nighttime appearance, adherence to theme, game playability, environmentalism, and appropriateness of prizes.

=== Mobot ===
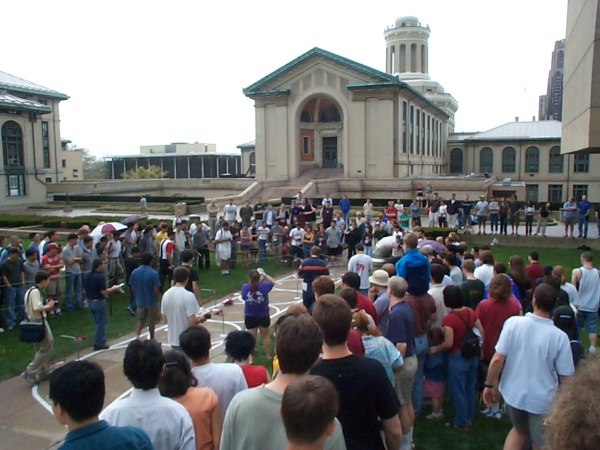
A mobot approaches the end of the course, with Hamerschlag Hall in the background.

"Mobot," a general term resulting from shortening "mobile robot", is an annual competition at Carnegie Mellon that made its debut in 1994. In this event, robots try (autonomously) to pass through gates, in order, and reach the finish line. There is a white line on the pavement connecting the gates, and the line is normally used to find the gates, though it is not mandated by the rules that the robots follow the line. Towards the end of the course, the lines split and merge randomly, and knowledge of which line leads to the next gate is needed to consistently finish the course. This information is provided by the judges shortly before the actual competition begins. The current undergraduate mobot course record of 1:17:10 is held by Nathaniel Barshay for his entry "AEPi" which competed in 2010. The overall mobot course record of 33.99 seconds is held by a Michael Licitra and Jeff McMahill set in 2009. In Carnival fashion, awards are presented to overall winners. The rewards are as follows: First Place ($1000), Second Place ($500), Third Place ($250), Open Class ($250), Judges' Choice ($100), Course Record ($250), and MoboJoust ($100).

== Kiltie Band ==
The Kiltie Band is the concert and marching band of Carnegie Mellon University, Pittsburgh, Pennsylvania, United States. It is known for wearing kilts, in recognition of the Scottish-American ancestry of Andrew Carnegie, the founder of the university. As of 2021, the band's director is Carnegie Mellon and Kiltie alumnus Jeremy Olisar. The previous director, serving the band for 38 years, was music professor Paul Gerlach. The band was formed in 1908 with seven members and has grown to more than 130 members. The band took the field for its first official performance on November 25, 1922 on what would have been Andrew Carnegie's 87th birthday. Until 1957, the band was male only, but in that year a female flutist joined and by 1961 there were eleven young women in the band. In the early nineties the band, under the direction of Paul Gerlach who was known as the Director For Life without the Possibility for Parole, started a new tradition within the band. Drawing inspiration from the critically acclaimed 1975 film, Monty Python and the Holy Grail, a trumpeter of the band (Ray Strobel), wrote an arrangement of King Arthur's Quest for the band. To this day, a King takes to the track every home game between the third and fourth quarters, to quest for the Grail, with his loyal steed, Patsy. The Kiltie Marching Band consists of musicians and colorguard and plays at all Carnegie Mellon home football games. There is a new show every week with music ranging from traditional marches and oldies to current pop tunes and jazz standards. After football season, the Kiltie Concert Band plays a holiday concert and two spring concerts, including a performance at Carnegie Mellon’s Spring Carnival. Additionally, a part of the band gets together and acts as a pep band for the basketball teams. Membership is open to all members of the campus/community without audition. Participants must do their best to promote the success of the ensemble through attendance, attitude, and dependability.

=== Cheers and lyrics ===
- Cheermaster & Anti-Cheermaster
- King Arthur
- Away Games
- Bananas
- Senior Cartwheels
- Taking/Defending the Hill
- Chocolate Milk
- Hail Carnegie
- Jam
- Kickline
- Pushups
- Scatter Show
