= Dietrich College of Humanities and Social Sciences =

Coordinates: 40.443504°N 79.941571°W

- Former names: College of Humanities and Social Sciences (1969–2011)
- Type: Private College of Humanities and Social Sciences
- Established: 1969
- Dean: Cassidy Sugimoto
- Academic staff: 207
- Undergraduates: 1,228
- Postgraduates: 294
- Location: Pittsburgh, Pennsylvania
- Campus: Urban
- Website: cmu.edu/dietrich

The Marianna Brown Dietrich College of Humanities and Social Sciences (Dietrich College) is the liberal and professional studies college and the second-largest academic unit by enrollment (after the Carnegie Mellon College of Engineering) at Carnegie Mellon University in Pittsburgh, Pennsylvania, USA. The college emphasizes study through rigorous analysis and technology of the behaviors, institutions, and beliefs that constitute the human experience, describing itself as “not an ordinary liberal arts school.” The college was named for Marianna Brown Dietrich, the mother of philanthropist William S. Dietrich II, after his donation of $265 million to the university in 2011 – the largest single donation in Carnegie Mellon history at the time.

The Dietrich College offers more than 60 majors and minors through its academic departments and specialized degree programs.

== About the Dietrich College ==
The College of Humanities and Social Sciences admitted its first freshman class in 1969, following the announcement of the pending closure of the Margaret Morrison Carnegie College, although roots of the college can be traced to the Division of Applied Psychology, founded in 1915 and led by Walter Van Dyke Bingham and Walter Dill Scott as the first research-oriented department within Carnegie Mellon. The administrative offices of the Dietrich College are located in Baker Hall. Most of the classes offered by the Dietrich College are held in Baker Hall and Porter Hall, but some classes, particularly the smaller recitation classes, are held in various locations throughout the campus. All undergraduate students at Carnegie Mellon are required to take several Dietrich classes (at least two, but usually more) as part of their program's General Education requirements. Dietrich College's general education program has been called "the most creative general education program of any American university" by The New York Times. The founding Dean of the Dietrich College was Erwin Steinberg. Past deans include John Patrick Crecine, Stephen Fienberg, Joel A. Tarr, Peter Stearns, and John Lehoczky, and Richard Scheines. The current Dean is information scientist Cassidy Sugimoto, who started in April of 2026. In December 2014, the Andrew W. Mellon Foundation awarded the Dietrich College a $2 million grant to develop training in digital humanities for Ph.D. students in the departments of English, History, Philosophy, and Modern Languages.

On September 7, 2011, William S. Dietrich II, the former chairman of Dietrich Industries, Inc., a subsidiary of Worthington Industries, Inc., pledged a gift of $265 million. In response to this gift, Carnegie Mellon renamed the College of Humanities and Social Sciences to the Marianna Brown Dietrich College of Humanities and Social Sciences after William Dietrich's mother.

== Departments and programs ==
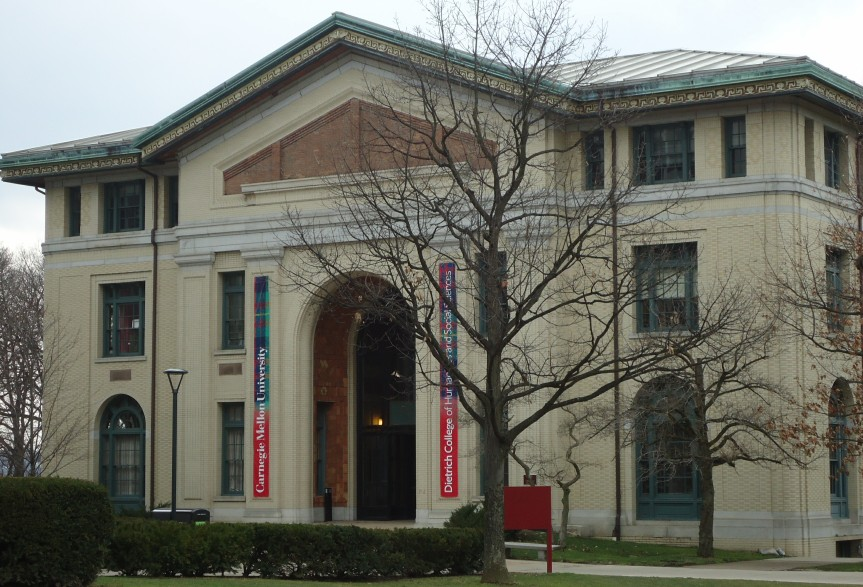
Baker Hall, home of the Dietrich College

Dietrich College manages seven departments, one institute, one center, and four interdisciplinary programs.

== Areas of study ==
Undergraduates can earn a Bachelor of Arts or Bachelor of Science in the following fields of study. Additional majors and minors are available in most fields as well. Graduate programs at the master's and doctorate levels are also available through the college.

- Behavioral Economics, Policy, and Organizations
- Chinese Studies
- Cognitive Science
- Creative Writing
- Decision Science
- Economics
- Economics and Mathematics
- Economics and Politics
- Economics and Statistics
- Environmental policy (additional major only)
- Ethics, History, and Public Policy
- European Studies
- Film and Visual media
- French and Francophone Studies
- German Studies
- Global Studies
- Hispanic Studies
- Information Systems (primary major only)
- International Relations and Politics
- Japanese Studies
- Linguistics
- Literature and Cultures
- Logic and Computation
- Neuroscience
- Philosophy
- Policy and Management
- Professional Writing
- Psychology
- Psychology and Biological Sciences
- Russian Studies
- Social and Political History
- Statistics
- Statistics and Machine Learning
- Technical Writing and Communication

In addition, undergraduate students can define their own major through consultation with their academic advisor.

=== Jointly administered undergraduate degree programs ===
The Dietrich College jointly administers the Bachelor of Humanities and Arts (BHA) and Science and Humanities Scholars (SHS) degree programs with the College of Fine Arts and the Mellon College of Science, respectively.

=== Pre-professional advising ===
The office of Carnegie Mellon's Pre-law Advising Program is located in the Dietrich College Academic Advisory Center in Baker Hall. Because it is a university program, all interested undergraduate students of the university are welcome to make use of the services offered by the program. Similarly, all interested students of the university, not just science students, can meet with the advisor for the Health Professions Program, located in Doherty Hall.

== Rankings ==
Several of the Dietrich College's graduate programs have been ranked in national and international surveys. U.S. News & World Report national rankings for graduate programs place the college's program in economics at 21st, English 50th, history 42nd, statistics 6th, and psychology 14th. The graduate program in cognitive psychology is especially highly ranked at 2nd in the country.

The 2020 Times Higher Education Supplement world university rankings placed Dietrich College at 55th in social sciences and 60th for arts and humanities.

== Research ==
The Dietrich College has particular strengths in the interdisciplinary fields of cognitive science, decision science, logic, technical writing, history and policy, and cognitive neuroscience.
