= Erwin Steinberg =

Erwin Ray Steinberg (November 15, 1920 - October 2, 2012) was an American scholar and professor.

He began teaching at the Carnegie Institute of Technology, now known as Carnegie Mellon University, in 1946, fresh from the U.S. Army Air Force. He was the dean of Carnegie Tech's Margaret Morrison Carnegie College from 1960 until it closed in 1973, and he was the first dean of the Dietrich College of Humanities and Social Sciences. He also held the Thomas S. Baker Professorship of English and Interdisciplinary Studies from 1981 to 1993, and in 1991 he was named Carnegie Mellon's first vice provost for education. In October 2006, at the 25th anniversary of the Master of Arts in Professional Writing Program that he helped found, Baker Hall A53 was named the Erwin R. Steinberg Auditorium in honor of his record of achievement and service to Carnegie Mellon. Then, at the age of 86 and after 60 years of teaching, he announced his retirement and taught his last classes in the Fall 2006 semester. He died of pneumonia in 2012.

== Education ==
- Ph.D., New York University, 1956
- M.S., State University of New York, 1942
- B.S., State University of New York at Albany, 1941

== Major research interests ==
- European novelists of the early twentieth century: esp. James Joyce, Virginia Woolf, D. H. Lawrence, and Franz Kafka.
- Style, composition, assessment of the teaching of writing.

== Recent Papers ==
- "Are Our Courses Working?" (with N. Ann Chenoweth, John R. Hayes, Paul Gripp, Eliza Beth Littleton, and David A. Van Every), Written Communication 16 (January 1999), 39–50.
- "Otto Weininger’s Sex and Character Was Never ‘Prime Material for a Comedy,'" James Joyce Quarterly, vol. 36, no. 3 (Spring 1999), 634–640.
- "Reading the Vision of Rudy Reading," James Joyce Quarterly, vol. 36, no. 4 (Summer 1999), 954–961.
- "The Source(s) of Joyce's Anti-Semitism in Ulysses," Joyce Studies Annual, ed. Thomas Staley, 10 (1999), 63–84.

== Selected books ==
- Approaches to Teaching Joyce's ULYSSES, co-ed with Kathleen McCormick. New York: Modern Language Association, 1993.
- Plain Language: Principles and Practice, ed. Detroit: Wayne State University Press, 1991.
- Communication in Business and Industry, with William M. Schutte. Malabar, Fla.: Krieger, 1991.
- Cognitive Processes in Writing, ed. Hillsdale, N. J.: Erlbaum, 1980.
- The Stream-of-Consciousness Technique in the Modern Novel, ed. Port Washington, N. Y.: Kennikat, 1979.
- The Stream of Consciousness and Beyond in ULYSSES. Pittsburgh: University of Pittsburgh Press, 1973.
- Needed Research in the Teaching of English, ed. Washington: U.S. Government Printing Office, 1963.
