= Cassidy Sugimoto =

American information scientist

Cassidy R. Sugimoto
- Education: University of North Carolina at Chapel Hill
- Scientific career
- Workplaces: Indiana University Bloomington (2010–2021); Georgia Tech (2021–2026); Carnegie Mellon University (2026--)
- Thesis: Mentoring, collaboration, and interdisciplinarity : an evaluation of the scholarly development of Information and library science doctoral students (2009)

Cassidy R. Sugimoto is an American information scientist who is the Bess Family Dean of the Marianna Brown Dietrich College of Humanities and Social Sciences at Carnegie Mellon University. Her research considers the formal and informal production, sharing and consumption of knowledge. She is the author of the 2023 Harvard University Press book Equity for Women in Science and the 2018 Oxford University Press work on Measuring Research: What everyone needs to know. She has also edited several books including the 2016 MIT Press book Big Data is Not a Monolith.

== Early life and education ==
Sugimoto was an undergraduate student at University of North Carolina at Chapel Hill, where she studied music performance. She remained at the University for graduate studies, but moved to the department of Library Science for a Master's degree and then to the Information and Library Science doctoral program. Her doctoral research considered the scholarly development of information and library science. She evaluated mentoring, collaboration and interdisciplinary training in doctoral education.

== Research and career ==
After earning her doctorate, Sugimoto joined the faculty at Indiana University Bloomington where she served as President of the Faculty Senate. From 2018 to 2020 Sugimoto worked as program director for the National Science Foundation program on Science of Science and Innovation Policy. Sugimoto was appointed Professor of Informatics at Indiana University in 2019 and served as Director of Graduate Studies in Informatics from 2020-2021. She moved to the Georgia Institute of Technology in 2021, where she was Chair and Tom and Marie Patton Professor of the School of Public Policy. In 2024, under her leadership, the school formally became the Jimmy and Rosalynn Carter School of Public Policy. She has also held several visiting professorships, including at KAIST (South Korea), Stellenbosch University (South Africa), Universiti Malaya (Malaysia), University of Granada (Spain), and Leiden University (The Netherlands). On July 1, 2026, she joined Carnegie Mellon's Dietrich College as the Bess Family Dean.

She was announced as a member of the Angewandte Chemie International Advisory board.

== Awards and honors ==
- 2002 University of North Carolina at Chapel Hill Concerto Competition Winner
- 2009 Association for Information Science and Technology James M. Cretsos Leadership Award
- 2014 Indiana University Trustees Excellence in Teaching Award
- 2014 Committee on Institutional Cooperation Academic Leadership Program Fellow
- 2020 Indiana University Bicentennial Award for service

== Publications ==
- Cronin, Blaise; Sugimoto, Cassidy R. (2014), Beyond Bibliometrics: Harnessing Multidimensional Indicators of Scholarly Impact, The MIT Press, arXiv:1209.1318, doi:10.7551/mitpress/9445.001.0001, ISBN 978-0-262-32328-4
- Sugimoto, Cassidy R.; Ekbia, Hamid R.; Mattioli, Michael (2016), Big Data Is Not a Monolith, The MIT Press, pp. 173–186, doi:10.7551/mitpress/10309.001.0001, ISBN 978-0-262-33576-8
- Sugimoto, Cassidy R. (2018). Measuring research : what everyone needs to know. Vincent Larivière. New York, NY. ISBN 978-0-19-756940-5. OCLC 1001968340.
- Sugimoto, Cassidy R.; Larivière, Vincent (2023). Equity for Women in Science: Dismantling Systemic Barriers to Advancement. Harvard University Press. ISBN 978-0-674-91929-7.
