= Carnegie Mellon School of Music =

Coordinates: 40.44474°N 79.94244°W

The Carnegie Mellon School of Music is a department-level school within the College of Fine Arts at Carnegie Mellon University, a private university in Pittsburgh, Pennsylvania.

A National Association of Schools of Music accredited school, it offers undergraduate and graduate study, as well as Pre-College Program in the summer. Students receive the highest level of individualized instruction from professional musicians and master teachers. Described as ‘the destination for the academically gifted musician,’ Carnegie Mellon School of Music offers majors in every orchestral instrument, piano, organ, guitar, bagpipes, voice and composition. In fall 2009, the school began offering a Bachelor of Science and Master of Science in Music and Technology, a tri-college curriculum that includes courses in the School of Computer Science and Carnegie Institute of Technology.

Instrumentalists are trained to perform various styles and periods of music through a range of performing ensembles. These include the Carnegie Mellon Philharmonic Orchestra, Wind Ensemble, Jazz Ensemble, Percussion Ensemble, Flute Ensemble, Contemporary Ensemble, and the interdisciplinary Exploded Ensemble, hosted within the School of Music and Carnegie Mellon's IDeATe program

Vocalists specialize in opera. Private studio instruction is augmented by choir, opera workshop and diction/ repertoire classes. Voice majors also study acting, dance and three languages. The School of Music presents two fully staged opera/music theater productions each year.

Carnegie Mellon offers a strong emphasis on contemporary music and conducting. Composition students write works for all types of instrumental and vocal groupings. All the works are performed and professionally recorded, culminating in an orchestral piece to be written during the senior year.
