= Peter Boatwright =

American academic

Peter Boatwright is the director and co-founder of the Integrated Innovation Institute at Carnegie Mellon University. He is also the Allan D. Shocker Professor of Marketing and New Product Development at the Tepper School of Business.

== Academia ==
Boatwright has an MS in Statistics from University of Wisconsin, and both his MBA and Ph.D are from University of Chicago’s Booth School of Business.

== Books ==
- Built to Love: Creating Products that Captivate Customers co-authored with Jonathan Cagan, Berrett-Koehler Publishers, 2010
- The Design of Things to Come: How Ordinary People Create Extraordinary Products co-authored with Craig M. Vogel and Jonathan Cagan, Wharton School Publishing/Pearson Education, 2005
- Managing the Unmanageable: 13 Tips for Building and Leading a Successful Innovation Team co-authored with Jonathan Cagan, Rivertowns Books Publishers, 2024.
