= Mary Ellen Bock =

American statistician

- Mary Ellen Johnston Bock
- Education: University of Illinois at Urbana-Champaign
- Scientific career
- Fields: Statistics
- Workplaces: Purdue University
- Thesis: Certain Minimax Estimators of the Mean of a Multivariate Normal Distribution (1974)

Head of the Department of Statistics, Purdue University
- In office 1995–2010
- Preceded by: Shanti S. Gupta
- Succeeded by: Rebecca Doerge

Mary Ellen Johnston Bock is a retired American statistician, now a professor emeritus at Purdue University after becoming the first female full professor of statistics and the first female chair of the department there. She was president of the American Statistical Association in 2007.

== Education and career ==
As an undergraduate at the University of Illinois at Urbana–Champaign, Bock earned a bachelor's degree in the German language in 1967. She switched to mathematics for her graduate studies at the same university, completing her PhD in 1974 under the supervision of Robert B. Ash with a dissertation on Certain Minimax Estimators of the Mean of a Multivariate Normal Distribution.

As chair of statistics at Purdue from 1995 to 2010, Bock led the department through a period of growth, and took a multidisciplinary approach to the subject that included computational statistics as well as application areas including biostatistics, statistical finance, and environmental statistics.

== Awards and honors ==
Bock is a fellow of the American Statistical Association, of the American Association for the Advancement of Science, and of the Institute of Mathematical Statistics. She won the American Statistical Association Founders Award in 2013.
