= William S. Dietrich II =

American industrialist and philanthropist

- Born: May 13, 1938; Pittsburgh, Pennsylvania, US
- Died: October 6, 2011 (aged 73); Pittsburgh, Pennsylvania, US
- Education: A.B. from Princeton University; M.A. from the University of Pittsburgh; Ph.D. from the University of Pittsburgh
- Occupations: Industrialist, Philanthropist
- Employer: Dietrich Industries (bought by Worthington Industries
- Known for: Philanthropy

William S. Dietrich II (May 13, 1938 – October 6, 2011) was a successful industrialist who took over and expanded Dietrich Industries, a steel framing manufacturer which he eventually sold to Worthington Industries. Late in life, he made two of the largest charitable contributions in higher education history, to the University of Pittsburgh and Carnegie Mellon University.

== Life ==
Dietrich was born in Pittsburgh in 1938 and spent much of his youth in Conneaut Lake, Pennsylvania, graduating from Conneaut Lake High School in 1955. He then majored in history while attending Princeton University and graduated with a bachelor's degree in 1960. He then served in the United States Marines. Following his military service, he returned to Pittsburgh to work at his father's company, originally a small lumber company that eventually grew into Dietrich Industries, which specialized in purchasing and repurposing scrap steel. Dietrich rose from salesman to president and eventually chairman and CEO and Dietrich Industries eventually grew into the United States' largest manufacture of light-metal framing for the construction industry with more than 1,800 employees at 19 plants in 17 different states. He sold Dietrich Industries in 1996 and used the proceeds to fund a charitable trust, which grew substantially from investments and from which he made his future gifts.

At the age of 40, while running his family's company, Dietrich entered the University of Pittsburgh's graduate program in political science, earning a master's degree in 1980 in and his PhD in 1984. He later authored a book in political science and was in the process of writing another at his death.

Dietrich served on the University of Pittsburgh's board of trustees, serving as chairman from 2001 to 2003, as well as the boards of the University of Pittsburgh Medical Center, Carnegie Mellon University, Chatham University, the Carnegie Museum of Art, the Pittsburgh Life Sciences Greenhouse, the Greater Pittsburgh Council of the Boy Scouts of America, the Pittsburgh Symphony Society, the Pittsburgh Ballet, the Southwest Pennsylvania Growth Alliance, and the Allegheny Conference on Community Development.

== Philanthropy ==
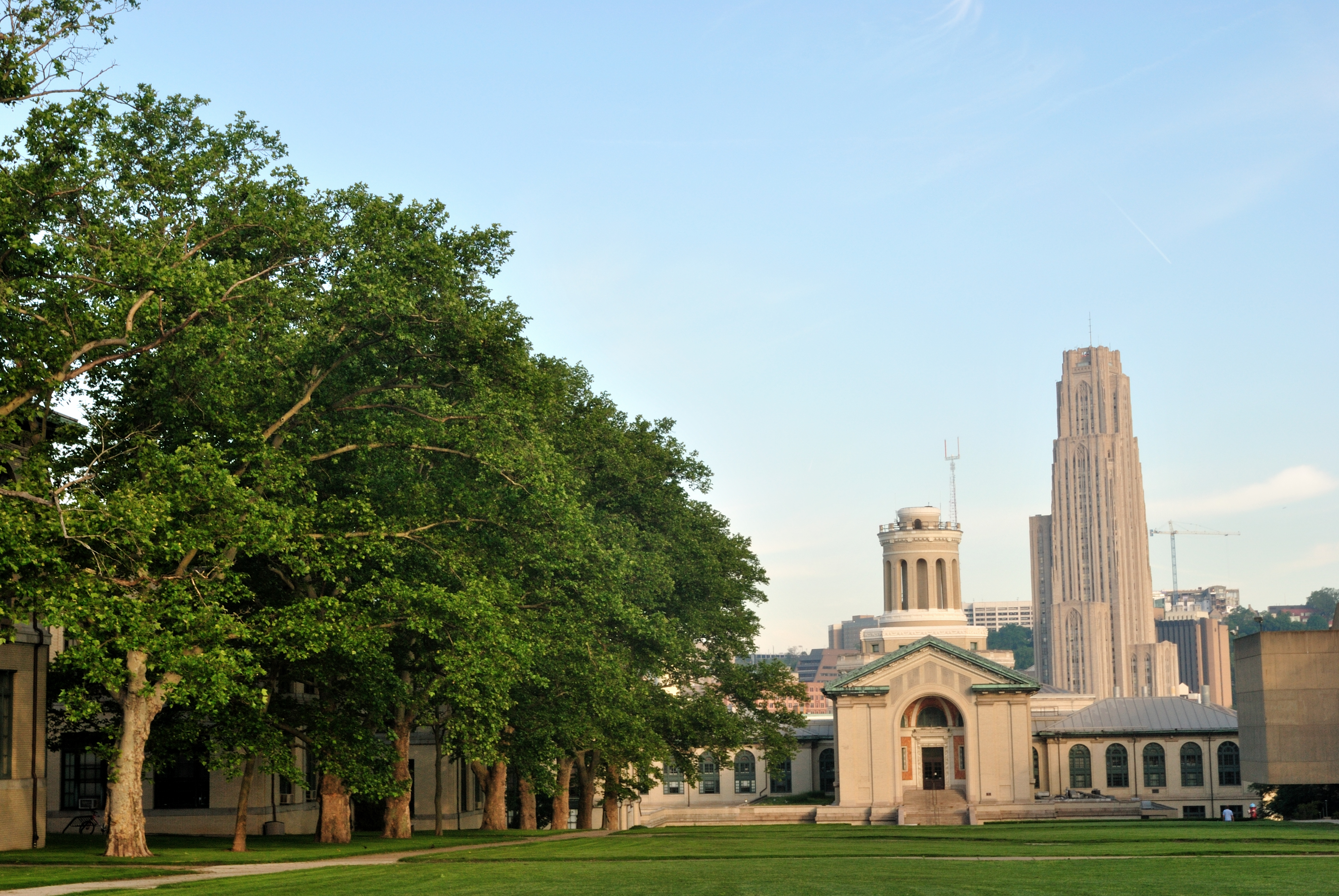
Carnegie Mellon University and the University of Pittsburgh

On September 7, 2011 Carnegie Mellon University announced a $265 million gift from Dietrich, the largest gift the university had received and one of the 10 largest by an individual to private higher education in the United States. In honor of the gift, Carnegie Mellon renamed the university's College of Humanities and Social Sciences to the Marianna Brown Dietrich College of Humanities and Social Sciences after Dietrich's mother.

Later that month, on September 22, 2011, the University of Pittsburgh, where Dietrich has earned two degrees and served on the board of trustees, announced it had received a $125 million gift from Dietrich. The gift was also the largest Pitt had received up until that time and 10th largest private gift to public higher education in the United States. To commemorate the gift, the university officially renamed its School of Arts and Sciences to the Kenneth P. Dietrich School of Arts and Sciences at the Board of Trustees meeting on October 28, 2011, after Mr. Dietrich's father.

Prior to his death, Dietrich was reported to have said that he was "moved by the thought of his parents gazing eternally at each other across Panther Hollow through the two schools that now bear their names."

Other significant contributions included $25 million to Thiel College, $12.5 million to Duquesne University, $10.6 million to the Pittsburgh Foundation, $5 million to the Boy Scouts, $5 million to the Pittsburgh Cultural Trust, $5 million to the Carnegie Museums of Pittsburgh, $5 million to Pittsburgh Symphony, $5 million to the Heinz History Center, $5 million to Chatham University, $5 million to the town of Greenville, Pennsylvania, and $2.5 million to the town of Conneaut Lake.

== Writing ==
Dietrich also was the author of two books: In the Shadow of the Rising Sun: The Political Roots of American Economic Decline, published in 1991, and Eminent Pittsburghers: Profiles of the City’s Founding Industrialists, a collection of biographical essays originally published in the Pittsburgh Quarterly but assembled into a book published in 2011. At his death, he was in the process of writing a third book, to which he had given the title American Recessional: The U.S. Decline and the Rise of China.

== Death ==
On October 6, 2011, Dietrich died from gallbladder cancer at the age of 73.
