= Jonathan Chapman (academic) =

British ecologist

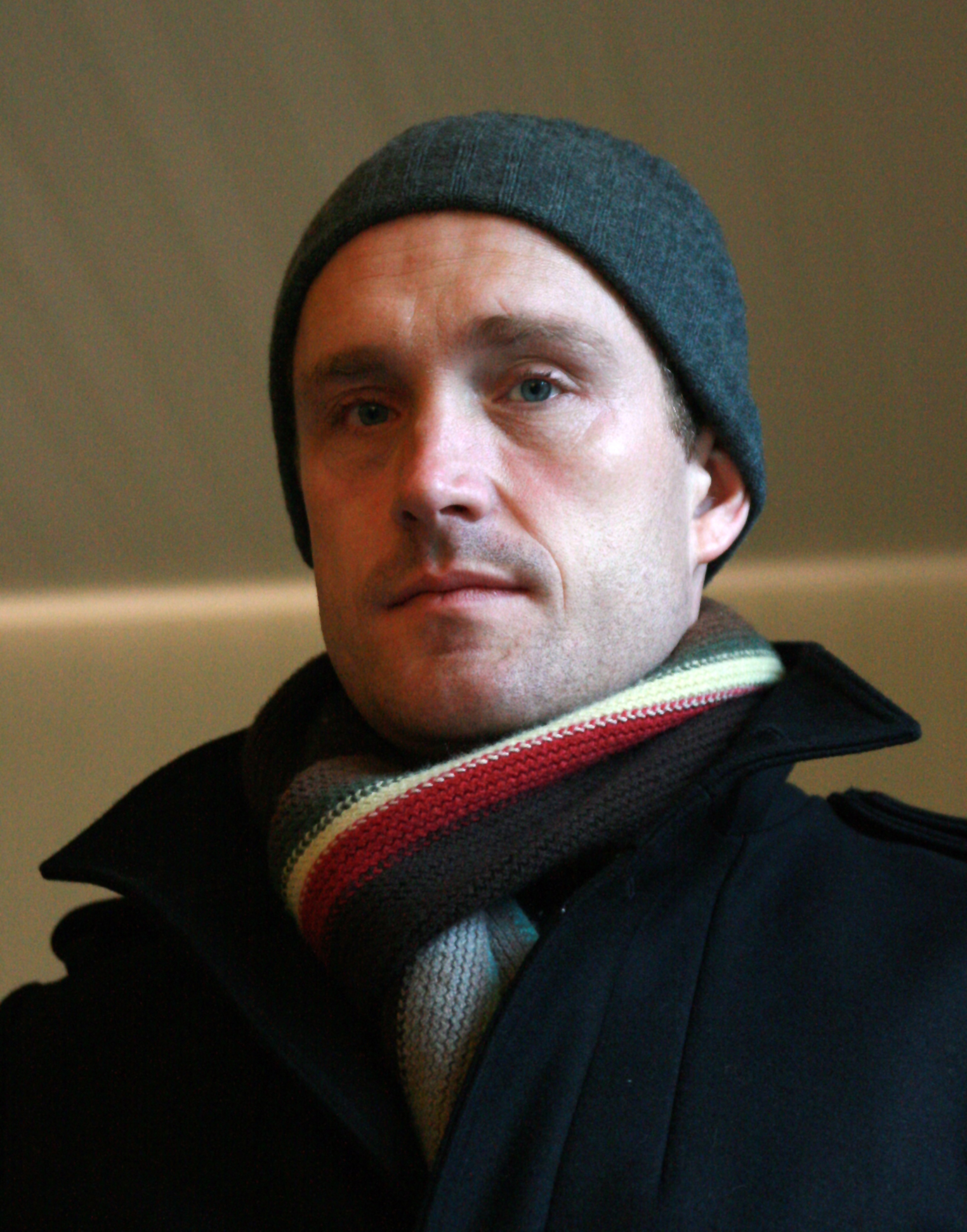
Professor Jonathan Chapman

Jonathan Chapman (born 1974) is Professor and Director of Doctoral Studies, and Head of the School of Design at Carnegie Mellon University, USA. His research tackles our throwaway society by developing design strategies for longer-lasting products, materials and user experiences – an approach he calls, emotionally durable design.

He is a visiting professor in Design at the Politecnico di Milano and serve as a thesis advisor to Master's and PhD students at MIT, Cambridge University, Royal College of Art, and KAIST. Chapman holds a PhD in design (2008), MA in Design Futures (2001), and BA (Hons) in Product Design (1997). In 2013, aged just 38, he became the youngest person in England to be awarded a Full Professorship in Design.

Chapman's work on the behavioural dimension of product longevity was first established in his book, Emotionally Durable Design: Objects, Experiences & Empathy. The theory proposes the creation of products that endure in terms of their technological, physical and emotional durability – a call to arms for professionals, students and academic creatives to think about designing things we would cherish and keep, rather than throw away. He argues that designing products should incorporate a lasting emotional as well as physical perspective. Through this design approach, we increase value, conserve resources and prevent materials from becoming waste. On describing Chapman's research, New Scientist defined him as 'a new breed of sustainable design thinker'. Chapman feels that emotionally durable design represents a core sustainable design strategy.

According to the United Nations Industrial Development Organization Chapman's work has advanced product design and business thinking in a range of settings. He advises a number of global businesses on how they can design their products and services in a more sustainable way – environmentally, socially and financially, including Puma, Philips, Sony and The Body Shop. Through publications, training, exhibitions, master-classes and films, this research has transformed understanding of sustainable design in professional, policy and cultural settings, propelling the field beyond its focus on energy and materials, towards deeper engagements that link psychosocial phenomena with ideas about consumption and waste; helping them to cut waste and to enhance product, material and brand value.

Chapman's work is cited in books, journals and a range of popular international publications and broadcast media including, New Scientist CNN International, New Statesman, New York Times, The Telegraph, The Independent and several features and interviews on BBC Radio 4, including: You & Yours, Click-On and The Today Programme.

Books

- Chapman, J., (Ed) "Meaningful Stuff: Design that Lasts", MIT Press, 2021
- Chapman, J., (Ed) "Routledge Handbook of Sustainable Product Design", Routledge, London, 2017
- Chapman, J., Emotionally Durable Design: Objects, Experiences and Empathy, Revised and expanded second edition, Routledge, London, 2015
- Chapman, J. & Gant, N. (Eds), Designers, Visionaries & Other Stories: A Collection of Sustainable Design Essays, Earthscan, London, 2007

Key Texts

- Chapman, J., 'Designing Meaningful & Lasting User Experiences', in Moran, A. and O'Brien, S. [Eds], Love Objects: Emotion, Design & Material Culture, Bloomsbury, London, 2014
- Chapman, J., 'Prospect, Seed & Activate', in Fletcher, K. & Tham, M. [Eds] The Routledge Handbook of Sustainability and Fashion (Routledge International Handbooks), Routledge, UK, 2014
- Chapman, J., 'Meaningful Stuff: Towards longer lasting products', in Karana, E., Pedgley, O. & Rognoli, V. [Eds], Materials Experience: Contemporary Issues Connecting Materials and Product Design, Elsevier, Amsterdam, 2013
- Chapman, J., 'Emotionally Sustainable Design', in Walker, S. & Giard, J. [eds], The Handbook of Sustainable Design, Berg, London, 2012
- Chapman, J., 'Subject Object Relationships and Emotionally Durable Design', a contributing chapter in Cooper, T. (Ed), Longer Lasting Products: Alternatives to the Throwaway Society, Gower, Farnham, 2010, pp61–76
- Chapman, J., 'No Alternative', in Predan. B., Krecic, P. & Subic, S. (Eds), Sustainable Alternatives in Design, Pekinpah, Slovenia, 2009, pp124–132
- Chapman, J., 'Design for [Emotional] Durability', Design Issues, vol xxv, Issue 4, Autumn, pp29–35, 2009
- Chapman, J., 'Evidence Paper', in House of Lords Science and Technology Committee 1: Enquiry into Waste Reduction, House of Lords, London, February 2008, pp56–58
- Chapman, J., 'Sustaining Relationships Between People and Things', in Desmet, M. P., van Erp, J. & Karlsonn, M., Design & Emotion Moves, Design & Emotion Society, Cambridge Scholars Publishing, 2008, pp47–65
- Margolin, V., Doordan, D., Brown, B., Woodham, J., Garland, K., Chapman, J., Cooper, R., Lee, S., Salinas, O., Boddington, A., Harper, C. and Pelcl, J., 'Brighton 05-06-07', Design Issues, Winter 2008, Vol. 24, No. 1, pp91–93
- Chapman, J., 'Desire, Disappointment and Domestic Waste', in Pavilion Commissions Programme, Pavilion, Leeds, 2007, pp4–11
