= Rebecca Doerge =

American researcher

Rebecca Whitbeck Doerge
- Citizenship: American
- Occupation: academic

Head of the Department of Statistics, Purdue University
- In office 2010–2016
- Preceded by: Mary Ellen Bock
- Succeeded by: Hao Zhang

Rebecca Whitbeck Doerge is an American researcher in statistical bioinformatics, known for her research on quantitative traits. She is currently the provost at Rensselaer Polytechnic Institute. She was previously the Trent and Judith Anderson Distinguished Professor of Statistics at Purdue University and then dean of the Mellon College of Science at Carnegie Mellon University, with joint appointments in the departments of biology and statistics.

== Education and career ==
Doerge was born in Stamford, New York. After graduating in mathematics from the University of Utah in 1986, she earned a master's degree in statistics from Utah in 1988, advised there by Simon Tavaré. She then completed a Ph.D. in statistics from North Carolina State University in 1993. Her dissertation, supervised by Bruce Weir, was Statistical Methods for Locating Quantitative Trait Loci with Molecular Markers.

After postdoctoral research with Gary Churchill at Cornell University, Doerge joined the Purdue University faculty in 1995. She chaired the Department of Statistics there from 2010 to 2015, and was appointed as Anderson Distinguished Professor in 2011. She moved to Carnegie Mellon to become dean in 2016.

== Awards and honors ==
Doerge became a fellow of the American Association for the Advancement of Science and of the American Statistical Association in 2007.

== Selected publications ==
=== Books ===
- Statistics at the Bench: A Step-by-step Handbook for Biologists (with Martina Bremer, Cold Spring Harbor Laboratory Press, 2010)
- Using R at the Bench: Step-by-Step Data Analytics for Biologists (with Martina Bremer, Cold Spring Harbor Laboratory Press, 2015)

=== Articles ===
- Churchill, G A; Doerge, R W (1994), "Empirical threshold values for quantitative trait mapping", Genetics, 138 (3): 963–971, doi:10.1093/genetics/138.3.963, PMC 1206241, PMID 7851788
- Doerge, R. W.; Churchill, G. A. (1996), "Permutation tests for multiple loci affecting a quantitative character", Genetics, 142 (1): 285–294, doi:10.1093/genetics/142.1.285, PMC 1206957, PMID 8770605
- Lippman, Zachary; Gendrel, Anne-Valérie; Black, Michael; Vaughn, Matthew W.; Dedhia, Neilay; McCombie, W. Richard; Lavine, Kimberly; Mittal, Vivek; May, Bruce; Kasschau, Kristin D.; Carrington, James C.; Doerge, Rebecca W.; Colot, Vincent; Martienssen, Rob (July 2004), "Role of transposable elements in heterochromatin and epigenetic control", Letters to Nature, Nature, 430 (6998): 471–476, Bibcode:2004Natur.430..471L, doi:10.1038/nature02651, PMID 15269773, S2CID 245772
