= Carnegie Mellon College of Fine Arts =

Fine arts school of Carnegie Mellon University

Coordinates: 40.44415745°N 79.9428695°W

College of Fine Arts
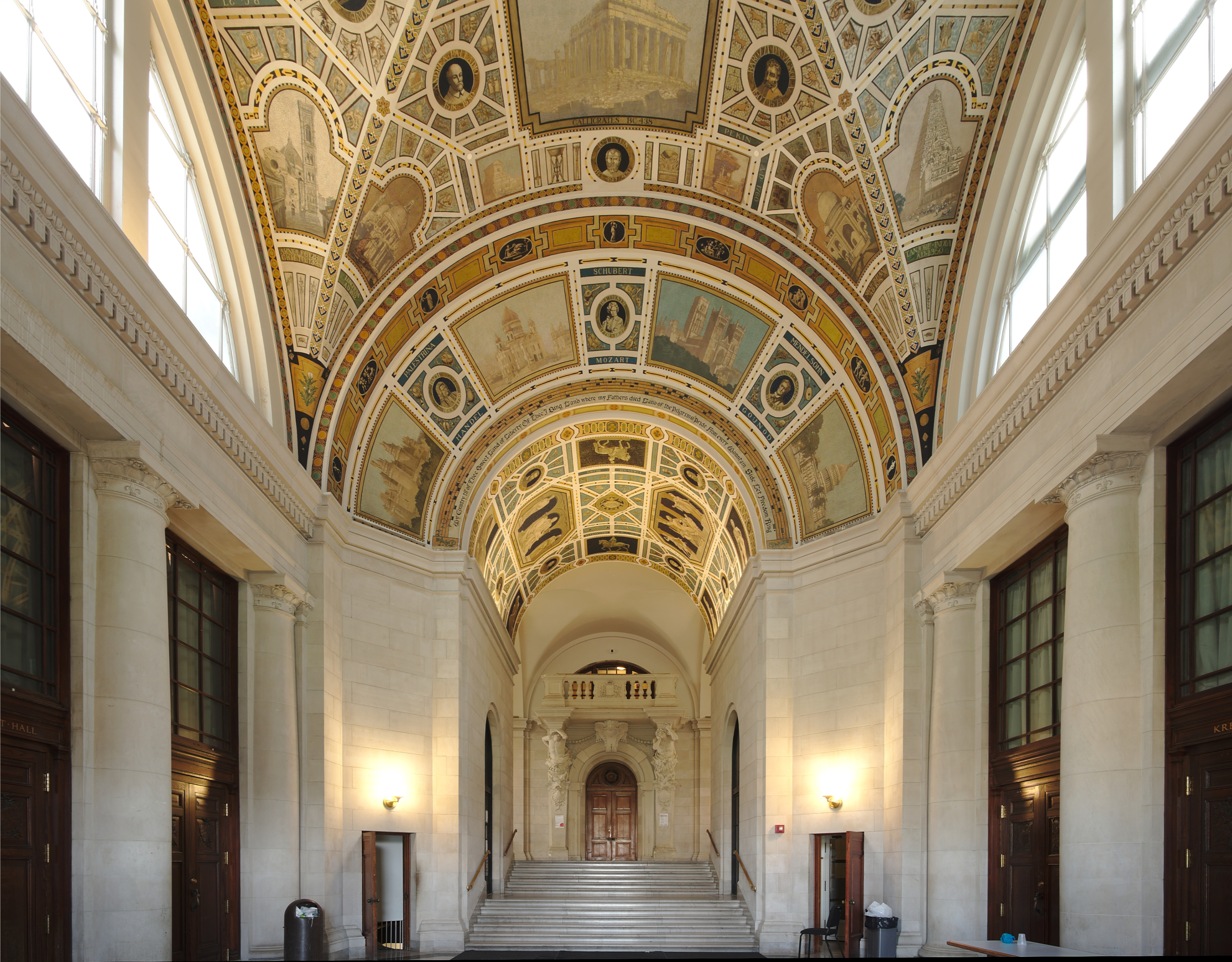
- College of Fine Arts, Carnegie Mellon University
- Type: Fine art
- Established: 1900
- Location: Pittsburgh, Pennsylvania, United States
- Language: English
- Website: cfa.cmu.edu

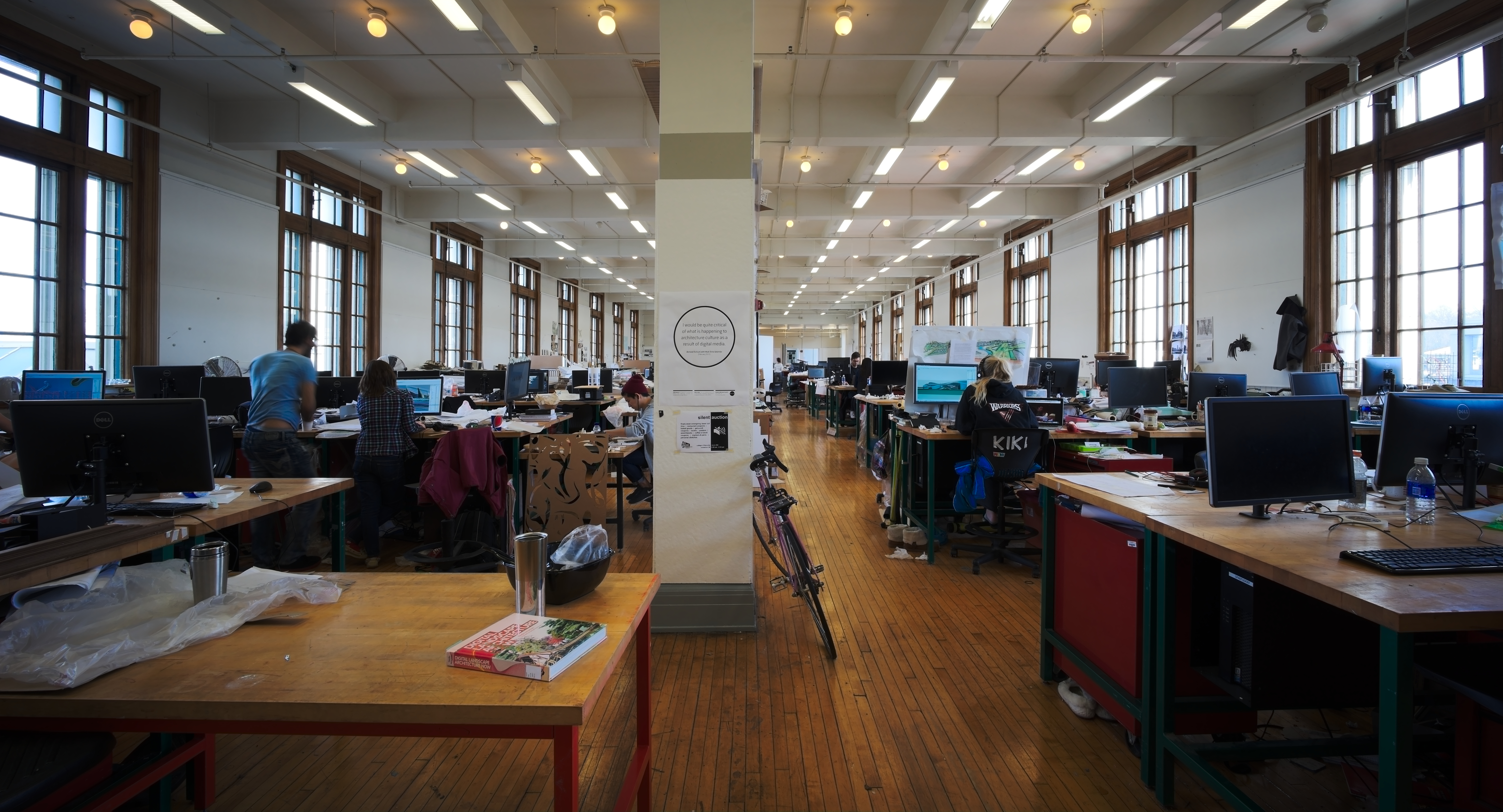
Architecture students in the CFA building

The College of Fine Arts (CFA) is the school of the arts at Carnegie Mellon University, a private university in Pittsburgh, Pennsylvania. It administers five department-level schools: the School of Architecture, the School of Art, the School of Design, the School of Drama, and the School of Music.

== History ==
The College of Fine Arts has its roots in 1900, when the institution was first founded as Carnegie Technical Schools. The School of Fine and Applied Arts was one of the original four schools within Carnegie Technical Schools and later became the College of Fine Arts. Officially founded in 1905 as the first comprehensive arts learning institution in the United States, CFA has educated outstanding artists, architects, designers, theater artists and musicians who have made important contributions to culture in the United States and the world for almost a century.

The College of Fine Arts concentrates on the education of professionals in the arts in the broader context of Carnegie Mellon University. Beyond their education in their chosen field, through required and elective course work, students are involved with other disciplines within CFA and within the other colleges of the University. Further, the college’s location in the Oakland District of Pittsburgh with its unique density of cultural resources (The Carnegie Museum of Art, The Carnegie Museum of Natural History, The Carnegie Library, the University of Pittsburgh, Hillman Library, the Frick Fine Arts Building, and Phipps Botanical Conservatory,) places CFA at the center of a premier cultural environment.

CFA also benefits from the presence of its Miller Institute for Contemporary Art (Miller ICA).

In addition, CFA actively promotes integrative and interdisciplinary practices throughout the Carnegie Mellon University campus, and currently offers the BXA Intercollege Degree Programs with Dietrich College of Humanities and Social Sciences, Mellon College of Science, and School of Computer Science. The undergraduate degrees are the Bachelor of Humanities and Arts (BHA), Bachelor of Science and Arts (BSA), and Bachelor of Computer Science and Arts (BCSA) respectively, and students are to be admitted to the two corresponding schools at CMU to be enrolled, where they will develop and experiment with their corresponding disciplines in the forms of major capstone projects.

CFA alumni have shaped the television, stage and film worlds; have created work collected in international museums; have composed for and are performing and conducting in major symphony orchestras, choruses and opera companies; have built notable buildings, designed building systems and architectural imaging systems; created significant innovations in graphic and industrial design; and are professors and deans in major arts institutions. These graduates have actively developed the innovations, inventions, techniques and information structures in their professional fields. They have also written, published and lectured extensively.

The educational and artistic life of the college is interwoven with a dense calendar of theatre performances, concert, exhibitions, film and media presentations and lectures by visiting artists, practitioners and scholars.

Notable alumni include Gabriel Macht, Christian Borle, Jonathan Borofsky, Philip Pearlstein, Steven Bochco, James Cromwell, Holly Hunter, Rob Marshall, Ricky Ian Gordon, Stephen Schwartz, Billy Porter (actor), Zachary Quinto, Ryan McGinness, Judith Light, Patrick Wilson, Ted Danson, Keith Lockhart, Matt Bomer, Josh Groban, Josh Gad, Leslie Odom, Jr. and Blair Underwood.

== See also ==
- Carnegie Mellon School of Design
- Carnegie Mellon School of Drama
- Carnegie Mellon School of Architecture
- Carnegie Mellon School of Music
- Carnegie Mellon School of Art
