= Carnegie Mellon Silicon Valley =

Branch campus in California

Carnegie Mellon University Silicon Valley
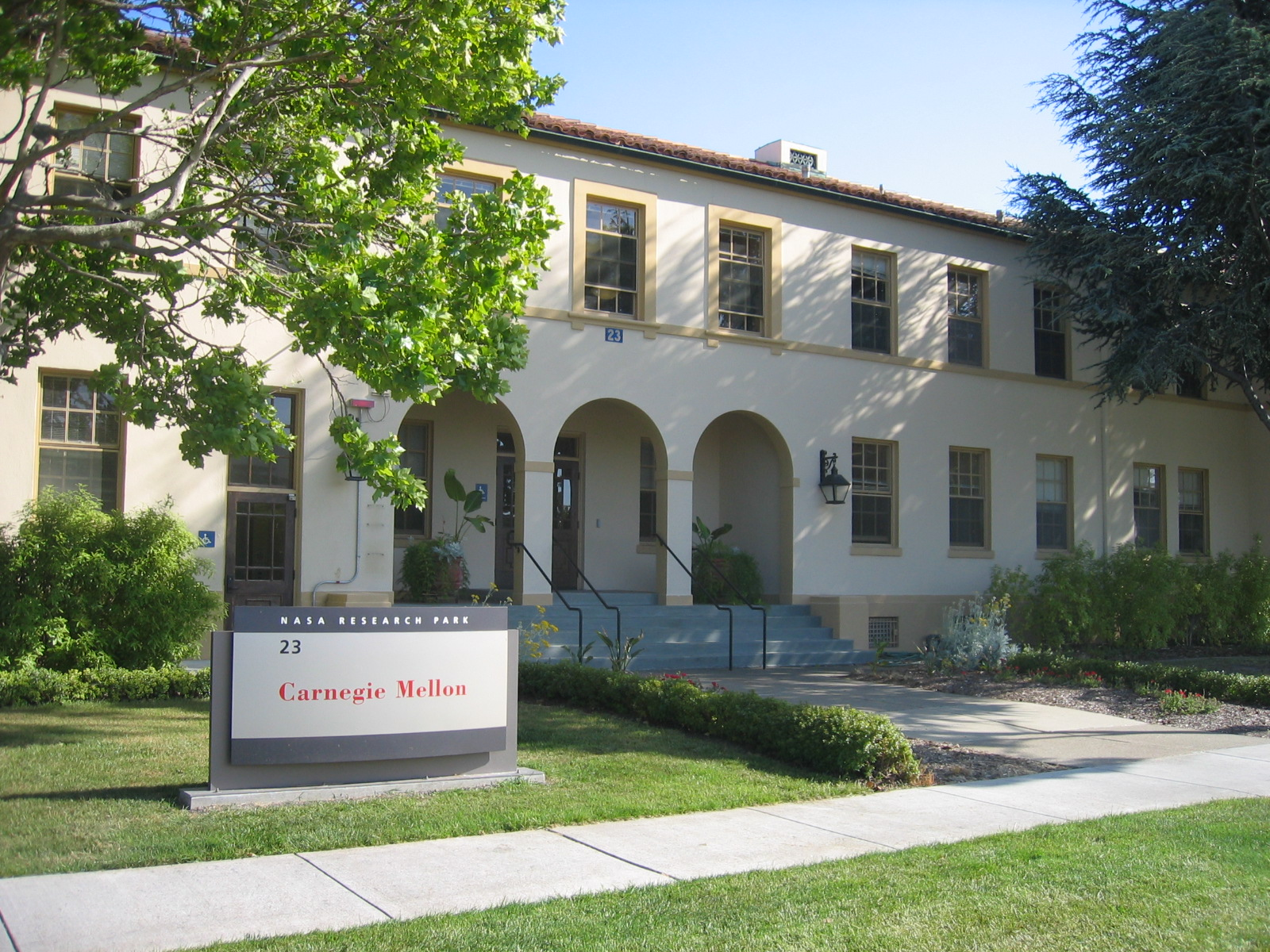
- Front entrance of Building 23
- Other names: CMU West, CMUSV
- Motto: "My heart is in the work" (Andrew Carnegie)
- Type: Private, Branch Campus
- Established: 2002
- Provost: Farnam Jahanian
- Location: Mountain View, California, U.S. 37°24′37″N 122°03′35″W
- Colors: Cardinal, gray, and Tartan plaid
- Mascot: Scotty the Scottie Dog
- Website: sv.cmu.edu
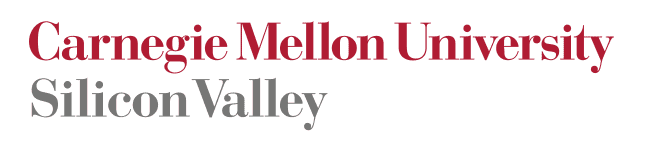

Carnegie Mellon Silicon Valley is a degree-granting branch campus of Carnegie Mellon University located in Mountain View, California. It was established in 2002 at the NASA Ames Research Center in Moffett Field.

The campus offers full-time and part-time professional Masters programs in Electrical and Computer Engineering, Software Engineering and Software Management. It has bi-coastal (split-time between Pittsburgh and Silicon Valley) Masters programs in Information Technology, and a bi-coastal Ph.D. program in Electrical, and Computer Engineering.

== History ==
Carnegie Mellon Silicon Valley opened in September 2002 under the name "Carnegie Mellon University - West Campus" to an original class of 56 students. James H. Morris, the Dean of the School of Computer Science at the Pittsburgh campus, helped establish the branch and served as the branch's first dean. Raj Reddy, a computer science professor at the Pittsburgh campus, was the school's first director. In 2008, the university's name was changed to Carnegie Mellon Silicon Valley to better reflect the proximity to Silicon Valley. In 2009, Dean Morris ended his appointment, and the College of Engineering (also known as Carnegie Institute of Technology or "CIT") at Carnegie Mellon University partnered with the Silicon Valley campus to bring more resources and a stronger connection to the main campus.

== Location ==
Carnegie Mellon Silicon Valley is located at NASA's Ames Research Center in Moffett Field. The campus is near high-tech companies such as Google, Microsoft, Yahoo, HP, and Lockheed Martin. Carnegie Mellon Silicon Valley currently occupies Building 23 and since January 2011, a wing in Building 19, which provides space for full-time masters students, faculty, and researchers. An extension for Building 19 has been in use since the Fall of 2012.

== Programs ==
=== Master of Science in Software Engineering (MS-SE) ===
In Fall 2002, Carnegie Mellon initiated a full-time and part-time Master of Science in Software Engineering degree. This program is offered under the Electrical and Computer Engineering department and is only offered at the Silicon Valley campus. It focuses on software engineering principles, and students are required to take courses in Software Engineering and Design, Analysis, and Systems.

=== Master of Science in Software Management (MSSM) ===
In Fall 2008, Carnegie Mellon initiated the Software Management Masters program. The program targets senior software developers and managers that wish to pursue senior management and executive careers. The full-time MSSM program focuses on Product Management, Strategy Development, Entrepreneurship, Enterprise Innovation, and Service Management.

For several years, Carnegie Mellon Silicon Valley operated a long-distance capability to Pittsburgh's Tepper School of Business.

=== Master of Science in Information Technology - Mobility and Information Security (MSIT-MOB and MSIT-IS) ===
In Fall 2009, Carnegie Mellon Silicon Valley initiated bi-coastal master's degree programs in Information Technology with specializations in Mobility and Information Security through the Information Networking Institute. In the bi-coastal programs, students are required to divide their time between the campuses in Pittsburgh and Silicon Valley and optionally complete an approved internship.

=== Master of Science in Electrical and Computer Engineering ===
The Masters in ECE program has equivalent course requirements between the Pittsburgh and Silicon Valley campuses. The Silicon Valley campus offers courses in the fields of software engineering, security, wireless sensors, mobile computing, machine learning, and wireless networking.

=== Master of Science in Technology Ventures (MSTV) ===
The bi-coastal Technology Ventures degree is an interdisciplinary program offered by the Integrated Innovation Institute. This program is aimed at entrepreneurs to gain the skills for launching a business or venture. Students are required to spend time at both the Pittsburgh and Silicon Valley campuses. Students gain knowledge of engineering and emerging technologies at the Pittsburgh campus, and gain skills in business, entrepreneurship, venture management, and product innovation at the Silicon Valley campus.

=== Ph.D. in Electrical and Computer Engineering ===
In Fall 2008, a Ph.D. program in Electrical and Computer Engineering was initiated, offering students opportunities for advanced studies and research in the fields of mobility, security, and wireless sensors and networking.

== Student population ==
Approximately 350 students are enrolled in Carnegie Mellon Silicon Valley's academic programs. About 25% of the part-time student population reside outside of the Bay Area. Due to it being located in Silicon Valley, many local students are from companies such as Yahoo, Google, IBM, Lockheed Martin, Oracle, Boeing and Microsoft.

Over 600 alumni have graduated from the Silicon Valley campus since 2002, adding to the over 6000 Carnegie Mellon alumni working in the Bay Area.

== Research ==
The campus has a growing research effort, which began in 2008 as a natural growth of the CyLab Mobility Research Center. The research primarily focused on software mobility, networking and security. CMUSV has now grown into a research community with initiatives in wireless sensors, machine learning, context area computing, security, energy technology, software and systems engineering and disaster management.

More recently, the research efforts have grown to include Disaster Management, Language Technologies, UAVs, Antenna Optimization, and Health Technology systems. Research centers include the CyLab Mobility Research Center, the Carnegie Mellon Innovations Lab (CMIL), the Center for Open Source Investigation (COSI), the International Center for Advanced Communication Technologies (interACT) and the Intelligent Systems Lab (ISL).

The Disaster Management Initiative (DMI) was established in 2009 with the mission to provide technical solutions to disaster prediction, management and recovery.

== Silicon Valley events ==
Carnegie Mellon Silicon Valley has also organized software-related events in Silicon Valley, such as Carnegie Mellon's Tour de Silicon Valley, where selected Carnegie Mellon students from the Pittsburgh campus are flown to Silicon Valley for a week of networking at various software companies.

Currently, the school offers TOCS - "Talks on Computing Systems", a weekly talk given by a subject expert on various topics related to software and computing. These talks are open to the public in addition to the faculty and students.

The school has also organized in association with UC Berkeley, regular software conferences for the software industry. The first of these took place on April 30, 2007, at the Microsoft Silicon Valley Campus and focused on The New Software Industry - Forces at Play, Business in Motion, while the second conference took place on April 22, 2008, at the Santa Clara Convention Center and focused on The Mobile Future - Technology Revolutionizing our Lives.

The campus has hosted a Disaster Management Workshop, focusing on its growing research division in Disaster Response. The 3-day event included a crisis camp for practitioners to come and collaborate on improving disaster relief methodologies.

== The Fence ==
In August 2008, the graduating class 2008 presented a gift to the university by installing their own Carnegie Mellon University fence on the Silicon Valley campus. The fence is a Carnegie Mellon tradition on the main campus where different student organizations repaint a long fence in the middle of the campus to promote a cause or spread a certain message. Members of the class of 2008 collected money to hire a contractor to build and install a 10-foot fence, that was then subsequently painted with images symbolizing the west coast (like the Golden Gate Bridge, or NASA's Hangar One). The fence was dedicated to Randy Pausch who died in 2008 (the top of the fence reads "Dedicated to Randy Pausch"). The remaining money was also donated and gift-matched to a total of $1000 to the Randy Pausch Memorial Fund.

== Alumni ==
Many graduates from CMUSV find employment with Silicon Valley tech giants such as Google and Facebook. Among them, ECE Ph.D. alumnus Heng-Tze Cheng developed the wide and deep learning system for Google's recommendation system. Faculty Joy Ying Zhang and the research staff of Mobile Technologies (creator of Jibbigo) were acquired by Facebook.
