= Hamid Ekbia =

Iranian-American scholar, theorist, and writer

- Citizenship: Iran, America
- Education: Abadan Institute of Technology (B.S.); University of California, Los Angeles (M.S.); Indiana University Bloomington (Ph.D.)
- Occupations: scholar, theorist, and writer
- Employer: Syracuse University

Hamid Reza Ekbia is an Iranian-American scholar, theorist, and writer. His academic writing is on AI, the political economy of computing, artificial intelligence, the future of work, and global development. Ekbia’s non-academic prose reflects on themes of solitude, war, reform, and revolution. His narratives weave together geopolitical histories with firsthand accounts of his lived experience as an activist in the aftermath of the Iranian Revolution and the rise of the Iranian Islamic regime.

== Career ==
Ekbia is currently a university professor at Syracuse University and director of the Autonomous Systems Policy Institute at Syracuse University Maxwell School of Citizenship and Public Affairs. He is the founding director of the Academic Alliance for AI Policy – a group of scholars and journalists who provide nonpartisan, interdisciplinary research, insights, and strategic analysis to inform and advise policymakers, media, and the public on issues of artificial intelligence governance. In his director roles, he advocates for responsible AI regulatory policy.

Before joining Syracuse in 2022, Ekbia was a professor of informatics, cognitive science, and international studies with the Luddy School of Informatics, Computing, and Engineering at Indiana University Bloomington. He was also the founding director of the Center for Research on Mediated Interaction. Before that, Ekbia spent a year as a visiting lecturer at the Indiana University Bloomington School of Informatics and then an assistant professor at the University of Redlands.

== Biography ==
Ekbia was born in Mashhad, the capital city of Khorasan.

Ekbia’s teenage years coincided with a period of major transformations in Iranian ways of life. The outlooks and attitudes young people like himself held also shifted dramatically, in no small part due to the introduction of an American educational model to Iranian society in the 1960’s and 70’s. In 1969, Ekbia transferred from Ibn Yamin, a high school built on the 19th century French education model, to the newly opened Alam High School at IMDb where he attended until graduating in 1973. Formerly an elite sports club, the school was established in 1969 by order of the former Prime Minister and then Minister of the Court of the Shah, Asadollah Alam. It followed the liberal American model and was run by U.S. Peace Corps volunteers.

In 1977, he received a Bachelor of Science in electrical engineering from the Abadan Institute of Technology in Iran. Ekbia then studied electrical engineering under Dr. Neville Luhmann, Jr. at the University of California, Los Angeles. Upon finishing his master's thesis in 1979, Ekbia abandoned his plans to pursue doctoral studies in plasma physics and traveled back to Iran in the aftermath of the Iranian regime change.

On February 14, 1984, Ekbia was arrested by Iranian authorities and taken to a prison where he spent the next 30 months. Upon arrest he was placed in solitary confinement, where he stayed for the first 352 days of this period. No reason for the arrest was ever provided by authorities, but it is presumed to be related to his political activism against the Iranian Islamic regime. Prior to its use as a detention center, the building where Ekbia was detained housed Alam High School, the school he attended in his teenage years. The high school had been recently converted into a prison after the Islamic Revolution.

Years later, he returned to the U.S. to pursue a dual Ph.D in computer science and cognitive science at Indiana University Bloomington, studying under Douglas Hofstadter and working closely with philosopher Brian Cantwell Smith and social informaticist Rob Kling. At Indiana University Bloomington, Ekbia became a Fargonaut at the Center for Research on Concepts and Cognition. Ekbia spent a year as a visiting lecturer at the Indiana University Bloomington School of Informatics before teaching at the University of Redlands. He then returned to Indiana, becoming a professor of informatics, cognitive science, and international studies with the Luddy School of Informatics, Computing, and Engineering at Indiana University Bloomington. He was also founding director of the Center for Research on Mediated Interaction. In 2022 Ekbia took a new position as university professor at Syracuse University and director of the Syracuse University Autonomous Systems Policy Institute in the Maxwell School of Citizenship and Public Affairs.

Ekbia was awarded an honorary doctorate from the University of West Bohemia in 2022.

== Ideas ==
Ekbia's body of research is tied together by a focus on the complexly mediated relations between humans, computing technologies, and the socio-economic, cultural, and geopolitical forces that shape our world. In his book Artificial Dreams: The Quest for Non-Biological Intelligence (2008) he introduced the notion of the attribution fallacy—the propensity for human beings to over-attribute intelligence to artifacts in unwarranted ways, similar to how we anthropomorphize our pets, toys, or other objects and phenomena. The term provides meaningful language to critique the overpromising, underdelivering nature of AI systems. His concept of heteromation accounts for transformations in the division of labor between humans and machines which have coincided with technological advances in recent decades. He co-authored the book Heteromation and Other Stories of Computing and Capitalism (2017) with Bonnie A. Nardi.

=== Political economy of computing ===
Ekbia has introduced and is developing a new area of study, which he refers to as the "political economy of computing". He approaches it as a dynamic relationship between computing and the capitalist economy. He envisions the study of the interactions between computing and the economy as a recursive process that would start at the macro scale of the social and historical (world-economies, nation-states, law, trade, infrastructures, crisis, etc.), move to the meso level of the institutional and organizational (firms, markets, platforms, innovation, jobs, automation, etc.) and finally zoom in on the micro level of the personal and psychological (affect, attention, labor, value, privacy, etc.).

=== Heteromation ===
Ekbia, together with Bonnie A. Nardi, introduced the term "heteromation" to grasp the practice of extraction of economic value from low-cost or free labor in computer-mediated networks. Heteromation is the third stage in the process of division of labor between humans and machines, following automation and augmentation.

In his book Heteromation and Other Stories of Computing and Capitalism (2017), he argues rather than simply automating tasks that were once performed by humans, digital technologies increasingly perform heteromation by pushing the workload of critical tasks onto end users, who come to act as indispensable mediators in processes of capitalist accumulation.

=== Artificial intelligence ===
Ekbia studies artificial intelligence (AI) from a socio-philosophical perspective, exploring the metaphors and language surrounding it. According to him, a great deal of confusion has currently been created through the use of "AI" as an umbrella term for a set of related technologies that are sold to the public as snake oil. The confusion, in turn, gives rise to policies and practices pursued by various social institutions (governments, businesses, media, judiciary bodies, funding agencies, etc.) the outcomes of which feed back into the underlying misconceptions about AI, generating even more confusion — a vicious cycle that seems to reproduce itself without end and without a driving vision on the horizon, let alone taking responsibility for it. The current fever about AI, which fuels these policies and practices, is symptomatic of a paradoxical situation where, on the one hand, technological innovations that, in the words of Edmund Husserl, "we can never cease to admire," allow us to tackle a wide range of health, medical, and environmental problems in a novel fashion, while, on the other hand, feeling helpless in the face of mounting economic, cultural, political, and environmental crises that seem to be spiraling out of control. It is in this sense that the crisis of AI expresses these other crises. AI does not cause these crises, nor is it a simple side effect of them; rather, it is their vivid embodiment, capturing and manifesting their coupled dynamics, their regenerative character, and their imposing logic.

=== Technology and development ===
Ekbia studies global development and the North-South geo-politics, largely from a scientific and technological perspective. He argues that technology and development have a close connection with each other. In the Western imagination, technology is often tied to modernization, progress, and social good. In modern times, various technologies (from mechanical harvesters to baby bottles and from radio sets to social media) have been introduced to the developing world with a promise of progress. The outcomes, however, have been mixed at best, with such interventions often disrupting established ways of life, replacing them with alternatives that have a fallen-from-sky feel to them. He has additionally written on the impacts of drone warfare as well as on the Iranian political situation.

== Bibliography ==
=== Books ===
- Sawhney, H. & Ekbia, H.R. (2022). Universal Access and Its Asymmetries: The Untold Story of the Last Two Centuries. Cambridge, MA: The MIT Press.
- Ekbia, H.R. & Nardi, B. (2017). Heteromation and Other Stories of Computing and Capitalism. Cambridge, MA: The MIT Press.
- Ekbia, H.R. (2008). Artificial dreams: The Quest for Non-Biological Intelligence. Cambridge, UK: Cambridge University Press.
- Sugimoto, C. Ekbia, H.R. & Mattioli, M. (eds.) (2016). Big data Is Not a Monolith. The MIT Press.

=== Selected publications ===
- Khan, S., Cole, D. and Ekbia, H. (2024). Autonomy and Free Thought in Brain- Computer Interactions: Review of Legal Precedent for Precautionary Regulation of Consumer Products, 15 Hastings Sci. & Tech. L.J. 95. https://repository.uclawsf.edu/hastings_science_technology_law_journal/vol15/iss1/5/
- Bennett, N. and Ekbia, H.R. (2024). Security or Vulnerability: The Dilemma of Refugee Crisis. Genocide Studies and Prevention 17, no. 3, 1–15. https://doi.org/10.5038/1911- 9933.17.3.1959. Special Issue on Humanitarianism Tech Governance.
- Ekbia, H. R. (2023). Killing in the Name of Precision: The Technoscientific Origins of Drone Warfare. Science for the People. 25 (3): 27-40 (Spring 2023). https://magazine.scienceforthepeople.org/vol25-3-killing-in-the-name-of/killing-in-the-name- of-precision/
- Rana, S. and Ekbia, H.R. (2021). Crisis, Rupture, and Structural Change: Re-Imagining Global Learning and Engagement While Staying in Place During the COVID-19 Pandemic. FIU Law Review. Vol. 16: 133-157.
- Ekbia, H. and B. Nardi. (2019). Keynes' Grandchildren and Marx's Gig Workers: Why Human Labor Still Matters. International Labor Review, 158 (4).
- Ekbia, H. (2018). The Tyranny of the Alter-Sphere. Figurationen. No. 1/2018. pp. 71–88.
- Ekbia, H. and Nardi, B. (2018). Automation and Algorithms: From Form to Content. Cultural Anthropology33(3): 360-367.
- Nardi, B. and Ekbia, H. (2018). The Future of Human Labor: The Case of War and Manufacturing. SIGCAS: Computer and Society Newsletter. http://www.sigcas.org/newsletter/volume-47-issue-4/7.pdf
- Blyth, P.L., Mladenovic, M., Nardi, B.A., Ekbia, H.R., and Su, N.M. (2016). Distributing Benefits and Burdens: Expanding the Design Horizon for Self-Driving Vehicles. IEEE Technology and Society Magazine.
- Ekbia, H. (2016). Digital Inclusion and Social Exclusion: The Political Economy of Value in a Networked World. The Information Society, 32 (2): 165-175.
- Qaurooni, D. & Ekbia, H. (2016). The Enhanced Warrior: Drone Warfare and the Problematics of Separation. Phenomenology and Cognitive Science.
- Ekbia, H. & Nardi, B. (2015). The Political Economy of Computing: The Elephant in the HCI Room. Interactions, pp. 46–49, Nov.-Dec.
- Ekbia, H., Matiolli, M., Kouper, I., Arave, G., Ghazinejad, A. Bowman, T., Suri, R., Tsou, A., Weingart, S., & Sugimoto, C. (2015). Big Data, Bigger Dilemmas: A Critical Review. Journal of American Society for Information Science and Technology, 66(8) 1523-1746.
- Suri, V.R. & Ekbia, H. (2015). Spatial Mediations in Historical Understanding: GIS and the Evolving Epistemic Practices of History. Journal of American Society for Information Science and Technology. DOI: 10.1002/asi
- Ekbia, H., Lee, J. & Wiley, S. (2014). Rehab Games As Components Of Workflow: A Case Study. Games for Health Journal, 3(4): 215–226.
- Ekbia, H. & Nardi, B. (2014). Heteromation And Its (Dis)Contents: The Division of Labor Between Humans And Machines. First Monday: 19(6).
- Ekbia, H. & Sawhney, H. (2014). Reason, Resistance, and Reversal: Metaphors Of Technology In Design and Law. Culture, Theory, and Critique, 56(2): 149-169.DOI: 10.1080/14735784.2014.904752
- Jozkowski, K. and Ekbia, H. (2015). Campus Craft: A Game For Sexual Assault Prevention In Universities. Games for Health Journal, 4(2): 95-106.
- Ekbia, H. & Suri, V.R. (2013). Of Dustbowl Ballads And Railroad Tables: Erudite Enactments In Historical Inquiry. Information & Culture. 48(2): 260-278.
- Day, R. & Ekbia, H. (2010). Digital Experiences. In Kallinikos, J., Lanzara, G. F. and Nardi, B.(Ed.). The digital habitat — Rethinking experience and social practice. First Monday, Volume 15, Number 6 - 7.
- Ekbia, H. (2010). Fifty Years Of Research In Artificial Intelligence. In: Cronin, B. (Ed.) Annual Review of Information Science and Technology, Volume 44. Medford, NJ: Information Today/American Society for Information Science and Technology, pp. 201–242.
- Ekbia, H. (2009). Digital Artifacts As Quasi-Objects: Qualification, Mediation, And Materiality. Journal of American Society for Information Science and Technology, 60(12), 2554-2566.
- Ekbia, H., & Evans, T. (2009). Regimes Of Information: Land Use, Management, And Policy. The Information Society, 25, 328-343.
- Ekbia, H., & Hara, N. (2008). Quality Of Evidence In Knowledge Management Research: Scholarly And Practitioner Literature. Journal of Information Science, 34, 110-126.
- Leuteritz, T., & Ekbia, H. (2008). Not All Roads Lead To Resilience: A Complex Systems Approach To The Study Of Three Habitats. Ecology and Society, 13(1), (1). [online] URL: http://www.ecologyandsociety.org/vol13/iss1/art1/
- Ekbia, H., & Kling, R. (2005). Network Organizations: Voluntary Cooperation Or Multivalent Negotiation.The Information Society, 21(3), 155–168.
- Ekbia, H. (2004). How IT Mediates Organizations: Enron And the California Energy Crisis. Journal of Digital Information,5(4). Available from: http://jodi.ecs.soton.ac.uk/Articles/v05/i04/Ekbia/
