= Carnegie Mellon School of Design =

Design school of Carnegie Mellon University

School of Design
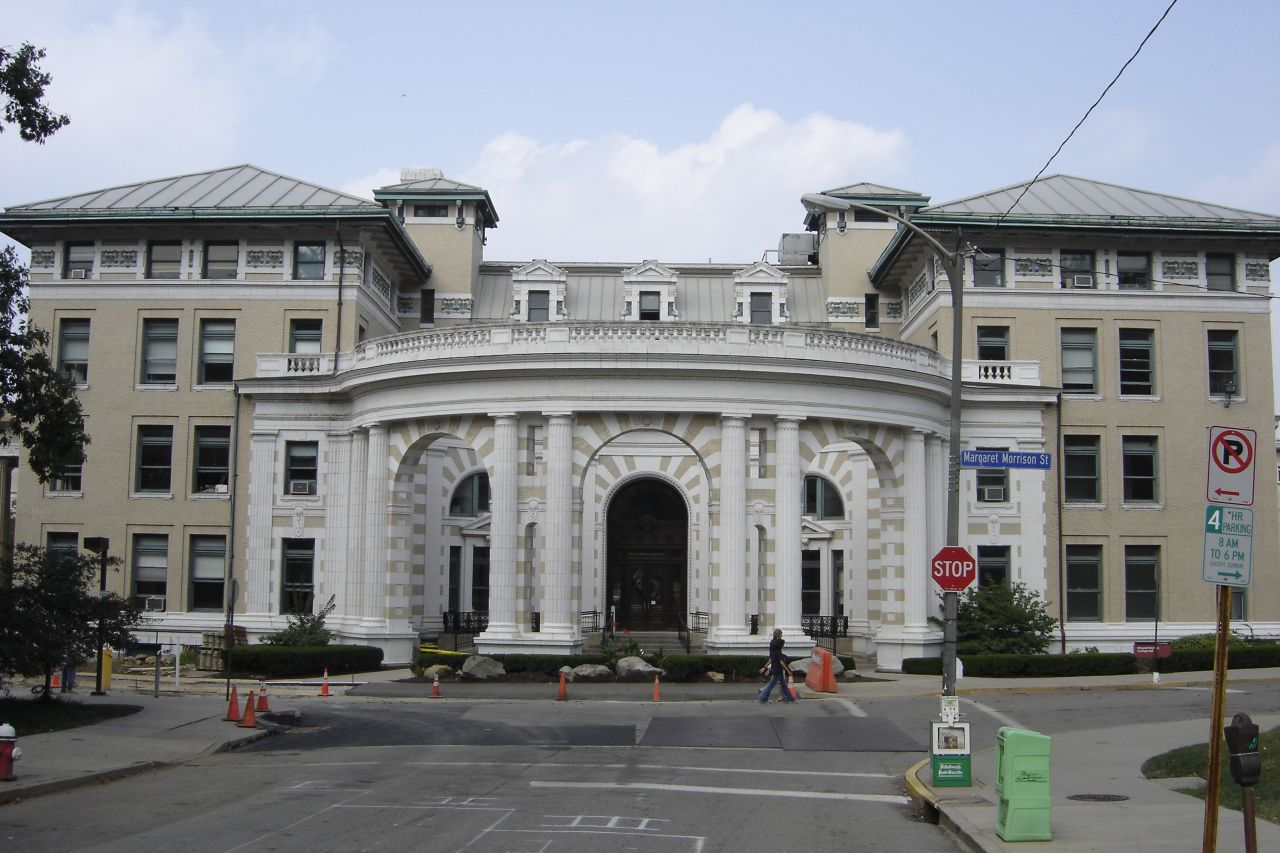
- Margaret Morrison, the principal facility of the Carnegie Mellon School of Design
- Type: Design
- Established: 1900
- Parent institution: Carnegie Mellon College of Fine Arts
- Location: Pittsburgh, Pennsylvania, United States; 40.44523°N 79.94397°W
- Language: English
- Website: design.cmu.edu

The School of Design is a department-level school within the College of Fine Arts at Carnegie Mellon University, a private university in Pittsburgh, Pennsylvania.

The school is accredited by Middle States Association of Colleges and Schools and awards BDES, MA, MDES, MPS, MII-PS, DDES, and PhD degrees. The School of Design has 21 full-time and 10 adjunct faculty.

== History ==
The university began as the Carnegie Technical Schools, founded by Andrew Carnegie in 1900, with the vision that a school would be created where the working-class of Pittsburgh could learn the skills and trades needed to enhance their careers and community. Soon after the formation of the school, it was faced with a demand for baccalaureate programs. In 1912, the school became the Carnegie Institute of Technology (“Carnegie Tech”) that offered four-year degrees for students that attended the College of Engineering and the College of Fine Arts.

The School of Design is currently housed within Margaret Morrison, a beautiful building with its iconic rotunda. Margaret Morrison is named after Andrew Carnegie's mother who played an important role in influencing Carnegie's legacy to create vocational training space for women. The women of Margaret Morrison, also known as Maggie Murphs, started taking classes in Porter Hall until their new building was completed in 1907. Originally, the school offered only vocational courses that trained women to be librarians, secretaries, seamstresses, and bookkeepers. However, it didn’t take long for the curriculum to evolve in response to female student demand. At a time when American women still didn’t have the right to vote, these changes were a harbinger for the way in which a woman’s role would transform in society over the next century.

In 1917, within the College of Fine Arts, the School of Applied Design was started with a series of focuses including commercial illustration, costume design, textile design, interior decoration, stage design, and printing—all within the Painting, Decorating and Sculpture departments. In 1928, a letter was written to Professor Keeble from Westinghouse Electric Corporation requesting that an Industrial Design course should be formed saying:

“The demand for the course in the fine art of design as applied to electrical machinery is one which we must meet within the next year .. . I hope that you and your faculty members will bear it in mind so that material may be selected and plans developed. I am sure that there is not a doubt in the world but that we shall bring this matter up with you a year hence.”

In the fall of 1934, Carnegie Institute of Technology was the first educational institution to introduce a bachelor's degree programme for industrial design. Precursors for the program was the School of Applied Art and the Westinghouse Electric Corporation. Donald Dohner, ‘The Father of Industrial Design Education in America’ and faculty member at CIT until 1935, was the main person responsible for the program's curriculum. His experience in industrial design at Westinghouse paired with his knowledge of tools and manufacturing made it clear that he knew what industrial design was and what it could be. The program he created is still being used by most industrial design programmes in the United States. Soon after, both the school and Westinghouse lost interest in the programme and, without a dean, it stayed a 2-year option until 1954. In 1954, a dean was placed to lead the industrial design program but it continued to have very little school and student interest. In 1967, Industrial Design merged with graphics, creating the Department of Design. It was officially established with four-year degree programs in industrial and graphic design. Also in 1967, the Carnegie Institute of Technology merged with the Mellon Institute of Industrial Research to form Carnegie Mellon University. In 1997, the department changed ‘graphic’ to communication design.

In 1994, The School of Design became the first institution to offer a degree in Interaction Design with the launch of a two-year master's degree (MDes). It was one of the first schools in North America to offer a PhD in Design (2000) and is one of four or five schools in the U.S. to offer the program. The program is built on information and communication design and teaches students the process needed in order to design desirable systems and interactions for the future.

The school, in 2004, helped launch the Service Design Network (with Koln International School of Design, Linkopings Universitet, Politecnico di Milano and Domus Academy) and its faculty have contributed to a growing body of research in this area.

In 2014 the School introduced a new area of specialty: Transition Design. Transition Design trains design students to think in systems and to think in terms of intervening in the system rather than designing a product or artifact. With this shift in perspective towards a new tradition in design, the program frames design as having a crucial role in creating a societal shift towards sustainable futures in a range of systems—transportation, healthcare, education, food and water, etc. Through transition design, these complex issues are addressed through interventions in all design specialties, alongside experts of other disciplines. This allows the research necessary to go beyond design on its own and get acquainted with interdisciplinary practice .

== Programs of study ==
Human/user-centered design research methods, traditional and emerging processes and technological innovations are employed in the design of products, communications and environments. Three broad areas of focus inform programs and curricula: Design for Service, Design for Social Innovation and Transition Design.

The School offers degrees at the undergraduate, graduate and doctoral levels:

=== Undergraduate degrees ===
- Undergraduate Degree in Design (BDes): communication design, product design and design for environments
- Undergraduate Minor in Design
- Undergraduate Interdisciplinary Degree (BXA)

=== Graduate degrees ===
- MDes degree (Master of Design) - 2-year degree (terminal degree)
- MPS degree (Master of Professional Studies) - 1-year course
- MA degree (Master of Arts in Design) - 1-year course

=== Doctoral degrees ===
- DDes degree in Design Studies (Doctor of Design): 3-year professional doctorate
- DDes degree in Transition Design
- PhD degree (Doctor of Philosophy in Design)
- PhD degree in Transition Design

== Rankings ==
Carnegie Mellon's School of Design is annually ranked as one of the top design schools in the United States. in 2016, U.S. News & World Report ranked the School of Design's Interaction Design program first in the country Communication Design (graphic) program 5th and the Industrial Design program third. CMU's Industrial Design program has historically ranked in the top 10 design schools in the U.S. in the annual Design Intelligence survey of architecture and design schools. In 2014 and 2015, LinkedIn ranked Carnegie Mellon's Design program as number one on their list: Best Undergraduate Universities for Designers. It was also ranked as number one for Graduate Universities for Designers.

== Previous Heads of the School of Design ==
- 1970–1985: Joe Ballay
- 1985–1987: Alex Bally
- 1987–1991: Carroll Gantz
- 1991–1992: Steve Stadelmeier (interim)
- 1992–2002: Richard Buchanan
- 2002–2008: Dan Boyarski
- 2008–2009: Steve Stadelmeier (interim)
- 2009–2019: Terry Irwin
- 2019–2022: Bruce Hanington
- 2022–2025: Eric Anderson (interim)
- 2025-2026: Ana Maria Pinto da Silva
- 2026-current: Jonathan Chapman

== See also ==
- Design engineer

== Bibliography ==
- Fenton, Edwin (2000). Carnegie Mellon 1900–2000: A Centennial History. Pittsburgh: Carnegie Mellon University Press. ISBN 978-0-88748-323-3.
