= Mellon College of Science =

College of Carnegie Mellon University

Coordinates: 40.44616°N 79.95098°W

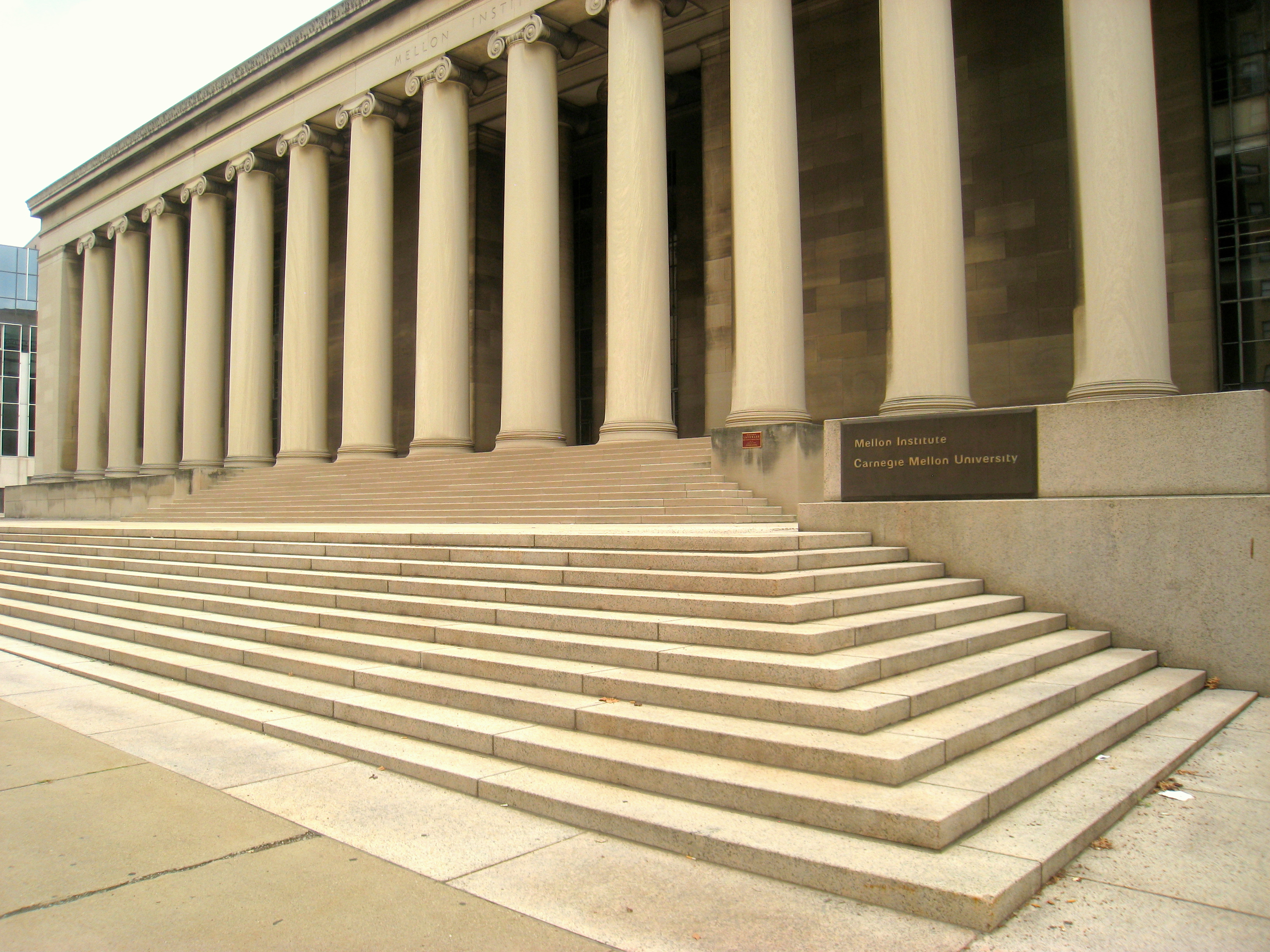
- The Mellon Institute of Industrial Research is one of the principal facilities of the Mellon College of Science
- Established: 1967
- Parent institution: Carnegie Mellon University
- Dean: Rebecca Doerge
- Undergraduates: 793
- Postgraduates: 315
- Location: Pittsburgh, Pennsylvania, United States of America

The Mellon College of Science (MCS) is part of Carnegie Mellon University in Pittsburgh, Pennsylvania, US. The college is named for the Mellon family, founders of the Mellon Institute of Industrial Research, a predecessor of Carnegie Mellon University.

The college offers various bachelor's, master's, and doctoral degrees. It also awards the Dickson Prize in Science. Since January 2025, the Glen de Vries Dean of the Mellon College of Science is Barbara Shinn-Cunningham, an American bioengineer and neuroscientist. She succeeds Interim Dean Curtis A. Meyer, and the previous Dean Rebecca Doerge, who served in the role from 2016-2023.

== History ==
The Mellon College of Science was founded in 1967, when the Carnegie Institute of Technology merged with the Mellon Institute of Industrial Research to form Carnegie Mellon University. The scientific faculty and staff of both institutions became part of the new college, then named the Mellon College of Engineering and Science. As the college grew and scientific research advanced, the Carnegie Mellon College of Engineering was split off in 1970, and the Carnegie Mellon School of Computer Science split off in 1988.

== Facilities ==
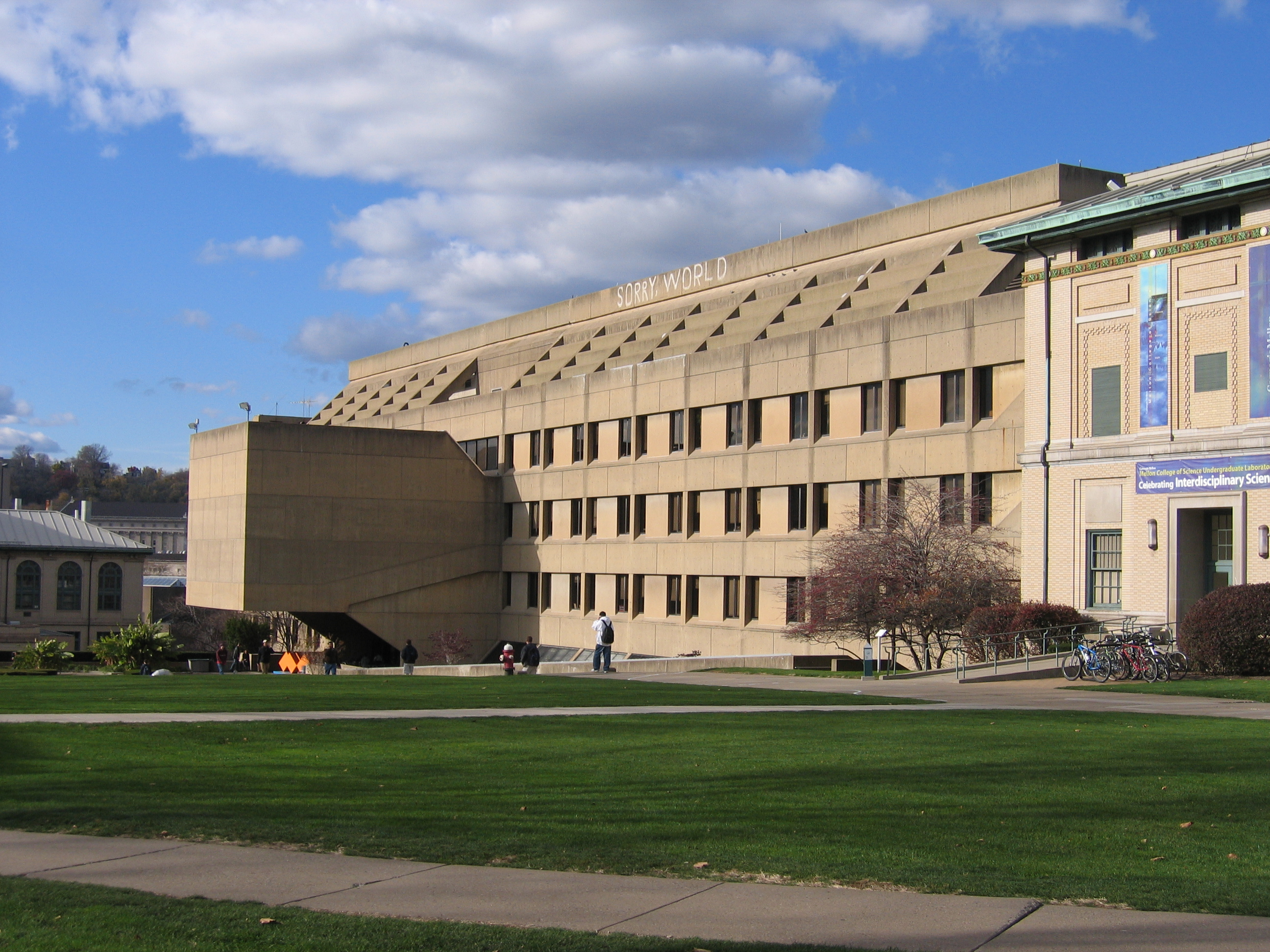
Wean Hall

The administration of MCS, as well as most of its biological sciences and chemistry faculty and research labs, and the college's library, are based in the Mellon Institute, which was constructed in 1937. The neoclassical building was added to the National Register of Historic Places in 1983, and was designated as a National Historic Chemical Landmark in 2013 by the American Chemical Society. The college's physics and mathematical sciences departments are based in Carnegie Mellon's main campus in Wean Hall, a Brutalist building constructed in 1971.

== Organization ==
The Mellon College of Science houses four academic departments: Chemistry, Biological Sciences, Physics, and Mathematical Sciences, each of which grants a variety of undergraduate and graduate degrees. In addition, the college also oversees or is affiliated with a number of interdisciplinary research centers, including the Pittsburgh Supercomputing Center.

== Notable people ==
- Ada Yonath (Post-doctoral fellow, 1969; Honorary Doctorate in Science and Technology, 2018), 2009 Nobel Prize in Chemistry
- Krzysztof Matyjaszewski (Professor), discoverer of atom transfer radical polymerization
- Clarence Zener (Professor, 1968–1993), theoretical physicist, discoverer of Zener effect
- John Pople (Professor, 1964–1993) 1998 Nobel Prize in Chemistry
- Walter Kohn (Professor, Carnegie Institute of Technology, 1950–1960) 1998 Nobel Prize in Chemistry
- Shafi Goldwasser (BS, 1979; Honorary Doctorate in Science and Technology, 2018) 2012 Turing Award
- Clifford Shull (BS, Carnegie Institute of Technology, 1937) 1994 Nobel Prize in Physics
- Paul Flory (Executive Director of Research, Mellon Institute of Industrial Research, 1957–1961) 1974 Nobel Prize in Chemistry
- Otto Stern (Professor, Carnegie Institute of Technology, 1933–1945) 1943 Nobel Prize in Physics
- Clinton Davisson (assistant professor, Carnegie Institute of Technology, 1911–1917) 1937 Nobel Prize in Physics
- John Nash (BS, MS, Carnegie Institute of Technology, 1948) 1994 Nobel Memorial Prize in Economic Sciences, inspiration for A Beautiful Mind
- John L. Hall (BS, MS, PhD, Carnegie Institute of Technology, 1956, 1958, 1961) 2005 Nobel Prize in Physics
- Paul Lauterbur (research associate, Mellon Institute of Industrial Research, 1951–1953, 1955–1963) 2003 Nobel Prize in Physiology or Medicine
