= Morency =

Morency may refer to:

== People ==
- Doug Morency, Canadian actor and comedian
- Jean-Frédéric Morency (born 1989), French basketball player
- Louis-Philippe Morency (born 1977), Canadian researcher
- Pascal Morency (born 1982), Canadian former professional ice hockey forward
- Pete Morency, American politician
- Pierre Morency (born 1942), Canadian writer, poet and playwright
- Vernand Morency (born 1980), American former professional football player

== Places ==
- Morency, Haiti, a village
- Morency Paint Shop and Apartment Building, a historic building
- Morency Island, a component of the Kvinge Peninsula in Antarctica
- Laval-Morency, Ardennes, France, a commune

== See also ==
- Morenci (disambiguation)
- Montmorency (disambiguation)
