= Eric Nyberg =

- Born: Eric H. Nyberg III
- Education: Boston University (BA, 1983); Carnegie Mellon University (PhD, 1992)
- Known for: OpenEphyra, IBM Watson (DeepQA), Multi-strategy question answering
- Title: Professor, Language Technologies Institute
- Awards: IBM Faculty Award
- Scientific career
- Fields: Computer science, Computational linguistics
- Workplaces: Carnegie Mellon University
- Doctoral advisor: Jaime Carbonell

Eric Nyberg is a Professor in the Language Technologies Institute of the School of Computer Science at Carnegie Mellon University. He is currently the Associate Director for Education and Curriculum, and previously served (from 2004-2022) as the Director for the Master of Computational Data Science program (formerly known as the M.S. in Very Large Information Systems).

Nyberg has made significant research contributions to the fields of automatic text translation, information retrieval, and automatic question answering. He received his Ph.D. from Carnegie Mellon University (1992), and his B.A. from Boston University (1983). He has pioneered the Open Advancement of Question Answering, an architecture and methodology for accelerating collaborative research in automatic question answering.

In 2011, Nyberg received the Allen Newell Award for Research Excellence for his scientific contributions to the field of question answering and his work on the Watson project. He received the BU Computer Science Distinguished Alumna/Alumnus Award on September 27, 2013.
