= Jian Ma (computational biologist) =

American computer scientist

- 马坚
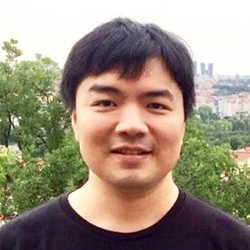
- Citizenship: United States
- Awards: Guggenheim Fellowship (2020); AAAS Fellow (2022); ISCB Fellow (2025); ACM Fellow (2025)
- Scientific career
- Fields: Computational biology; Computational genomics; Machine learning; Systems Biology
- Workplaces: Carnegie Mellon University (since 2016); University of Illinois Urbana–Champaign (2009–2015)
- Academic advisors: David Haussler (postdoc advisor), Webb Miller (PhD advisor)
- Website: www.cs.cmu.edu/~jianma/

Jian Ma (Chinese: 马坚) is an American computer scientist and computational biologist. He is the Ray and Stephanie Lane Professor of Computational Biology in the Kenneth C. Griffin School of Computer Science at Carnegie Mellon University. He is a faculty member in the Ray and Stephanie Lane Computational Biology Department.

His lab develops AI/ML methods to study the structure and function of the human genome and cellular organization and their implications for health and disease. During his Ph.D. and postdoc training, he developed algorithms to reconstruct the ancestral mammalian genome and evolutionary history. His research group has recently pioneered a series of new machine learning solutions for 3D genome organization, single-cell epigenomics, spatial omics, and complex molecular interactions. His lab also explores large language models, generative AI, and agentic AI to uncover gene regulatory mechanisms and the intricate connections among cellular components, with the aim of driving autonomous discovery and experimentation.

He received an NSF CAREER award in 2011. In 2020, he was awarded a Guggenheim Fellowship in Computer Science. He received the Allen Newell Award for Research Excellence (2025). He is an elected Fellow of the American Association for the Advancement of Science, the American Institute for Medical and Biological Engineering, the International Society for Computational Biology, and the Association for Computing Machinery.

He led an NIH 4D Nucleome Center to develop machine learning algorithms to better understand the cell nucleus. He served as the Program Chair for RECOMB 2024. He is also a member of the Scientific Advisory Board of the Chan Zuckerberg Biohub Chicago (CZ Biohub Chicago) and the RECOMB Steering Committee. He is an editor of Genome Research.

In 2024, he launched the Center for AI-Driven Biomedical Research (AI4BIO) at CMU, which will be a catalyst for innovations at the intersection of AI and biomedicine across the School of Computer Science and campus.

== Selected Recent Publications ==
- Zhang Y^{#}, Lu X^{#}, Kunisky AK^{‡}, Alam S^{‡}, Tang J^{‡}, Zhang R^{‡}, Wang S, Zhang H, Baroudi J, Ichcho W, Jia D, Ghorbanikalateh S, Ghorbanikalateh S, Wang S, Bennett DA, Mathys H*, Duan Z*, and Ma J*. Single-cell multiomics connects 3D genome and transcriptome alterations in Alzheimer's disease. Science, 393(6809):eadz1652, 2026.
- Chen V^{#}, Yang M^{#}, Cui W, Kim JS, Talwalkar A*, and Ma J*. Applying interpretable machine learning in computational biology - pitfalls, recommendations and opportunities for new developments. Nature Methods, 21(8):1454-1461, 2024.
- Xiong K^{#}, Zhang R^{#}, and Ma J. scGHOST: Identifying single-cell 3D genome subcompartments. Nature Methods, 21(5):814-822, 2024.
- Zhou T, Zhang R, Jia D, Doty RT, Munday AD, Gao D, Xin L, Abkowitz JL, Duan Z*, and Ma J*. GAGE-seq concurrently profiles multiscale 3D genome organization and gene expression in single cells. Nature Genetics, 56(8):1701-1711, 2024.
- Zhang Y, Boninsegna L, Yang M, Misteli T, Alber F, and Ma J. Computational methods for analysing multiscale 3D genome organization. Nature Reviews Genetics, 5(2):123-141, 2024.
- Chidester B^{#}, Zhou T^{#}, Alam S, and Ma J. SPICEMIX enables integrative single-cell spatial modeling of cell identity. Nature Genetics, 55(1):78-88, 2023.
- Zhang R^{#}, Zhou T^{#}, and Ma J. Ultrafast and interpretable single-cell 3D genome analysis with Fast-Higashi. Cell Systems, 13(10):P798-807.E6, 2022.
- Zhu X^{#}, Zhang Y^{#}, Wang Y, Tian D, Belmont AS, Swedlow JR, and Ma J. Nucleome Browser: An integrative and multimodal data navigation platform for 4D Nucleome. Nature Methods, 19(8):911-913, 2022.
- Zhang R, Zhou T, and Ma J. Multiscale and integrative single-cell Hi-C analysis with Higashi. Nature Biotechnology, 40:254–261, 2022.
