= Ziv Bar-Joseph =

Israeli computational biologist

- זיו בר-יוסף
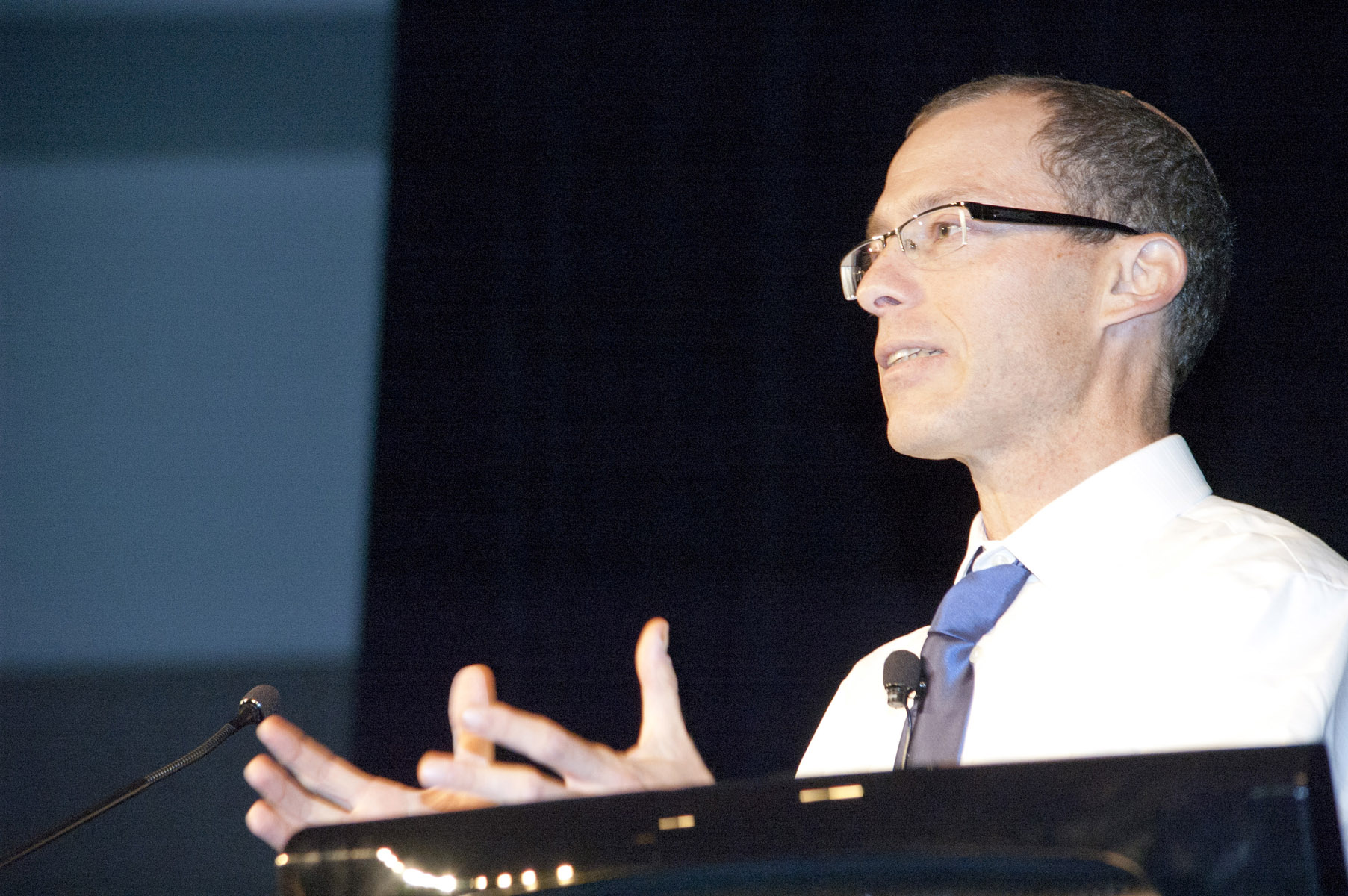
- Ziv Bar-Joseph speaking at ISMB in 2012
- Born: 1971 (age 54–55)
- Education: Hebrew University of Jerusalem (BSc, MSc); Massachusetts Institute of Technology (PhD)
- Awards: Overton Prize (2012)
- Scientific career
- Fields: Bioinformatics; Computational biology; Machine learning
- Workplaces: Carnegie Mellon University; Whitehead Institute
- Thesis: Inferring Interactions, Expression Programs and Regulatory Networks from High Throughput Biological Data (2003)
- Doctoral advisor: David K. Gifford; Tommi Jaakola
- Website: www.cs.cmu.edu/~zivbj/

Ziv Bar-Joseph (Hebrew: זיו בר-יוסף) is an Israeli computational biologist and Professor in the Computational Biology Department and the Machine Learning Department at the Carnegie Mellon School of Computer Science. Bar-Joseph is also a co-founder and Chief Scientific Officer at GenBio AI.

== Education ==
Bar-Joseph studied computer science at Bachelor of Science (1997) and Master of Science (1999) level, both at the Hebrew University of Jerusalem. He gained his PhD from the Massachusetts Institute of Technology in computer science in 2003, under the supervision of David K. Gifford and Tommi S. Jaakkola. Following this, he was a postdoctoral associate at the MIT Computer Science and Artificial Intelligence Laboratory (CSAIL) and the Whitehead Institute.

== Research ==
Bar-Joseph's research at Carnegie Mellon is primarily focused on developing computational methods to allow greater understanding of the interactions and dynamics of complex biological systems, particularly systems that change with time, such as the cell cycle.

At MIT, Bar-Joseph's group developed a novel algorithm to discover regulatory networks of gene modules in yeast. These modules are groups of genes that work together to perform tasks such as respiration, protein synthesis and response to external stress.

He is also interested in how insights from both computer science and biology can be used to affect the other field, in particular how algorithms from nature can be used in order to improve algorithms in distributed computing.

Bar-Joseph was the VP and Head of R&D Data and Computational Sciences for Sanofi in 2022. In 2025, He joined GenBio AI as co-founder and chief scientific officer.

== Awards and honours ==
Bar-Joseph has been awarded the DIMACS-Celera Genomics Graduate Student Award in Computational Molecular Biology and the NSF CAREER award. He was awarded the ISCB Overton Prize in 2012 in recognition of his significant and lasting impact in computational biology.

He co-chaired the Research in Computational Molecular Biology (RECOMB) conference in 2009 and 2010 and joined the board of the journal Bioinformatics as an Associate Editor in 2013.

== Personal life ==
Bar-Joseph is a keen runner and has run several sub-3 hour marathons. He lives in Pittsburgh and Shoham with his wife and three children.

== See also ==
- Michal Linial
