= Ray and Stephanie Lane Computational Biology Department =

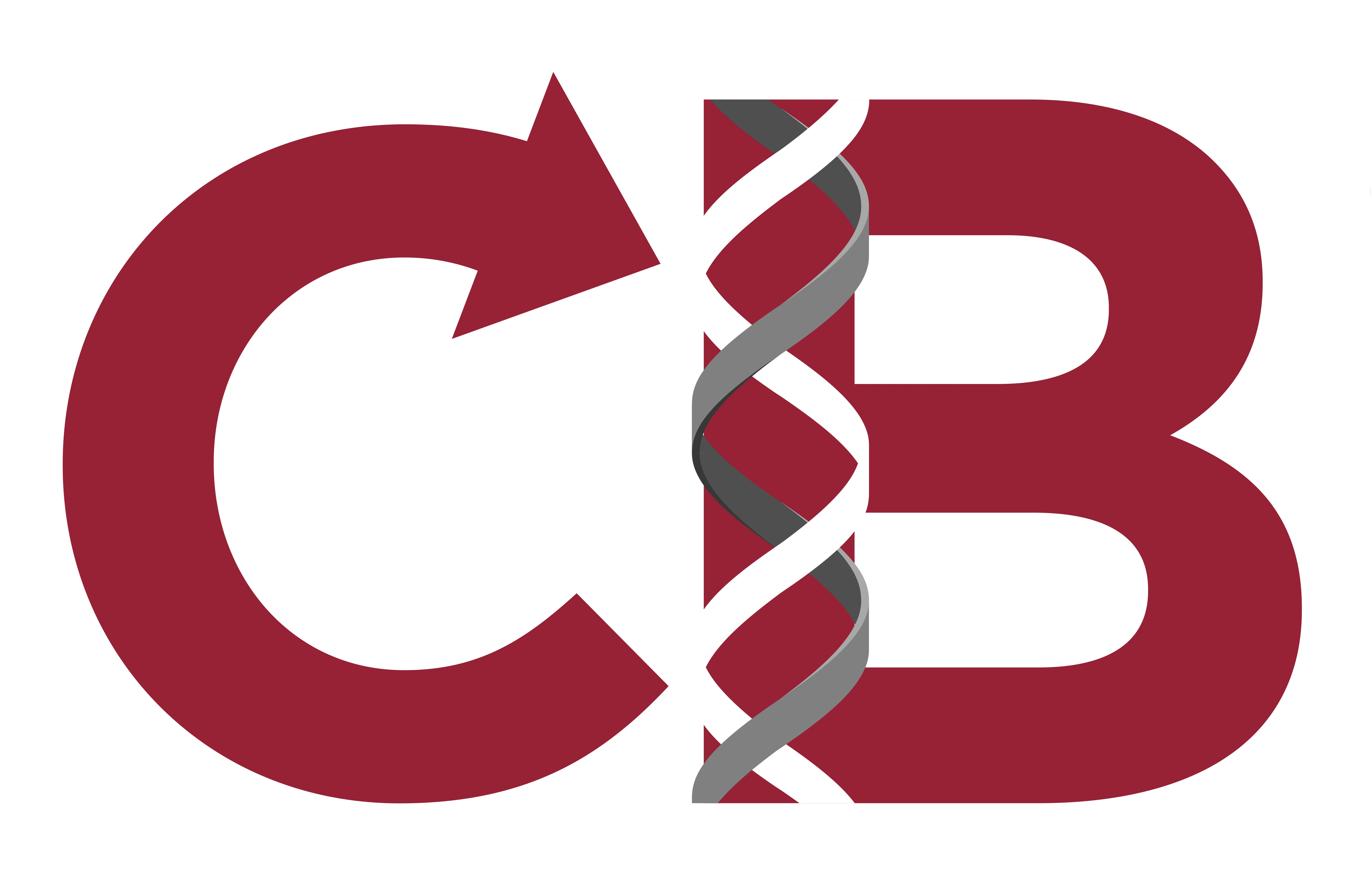
- Type: Private
- Established: 2007 (as Lane Center for Computational Biology)
- Location: Pittsburgh, Pennsylvania
- Campus: Urban
- Website: cmu.edu/cbd

The Ray and Stephanie Lane Computational Biology Department (CBD) is an academic departments within the Kenneth C. Griffin School of Computer Science at Carnegie Mellon University in Pittsburgh, Pennsylvania, United States.

== Introduction ==
Now situated in the Gates-Hillman Center, CBD was established in 2007 as the Lane Center for Computational Biology by founding department head Robert F. Murphy. The establishment was supported by funding from Raymond J. Lane and Stephanie Lane, CBD officially became a department within the School of Computer Science in 2009. In November 2023, Carnegie Mellon named the department as the Ray and Stephanie Lane Computational Biology Department, in recognition of the Lanes' significant investment in computational biology at CMU.

CBD specializes in genomics, systems biology, and biological imaging, pioneering advanced computational methods, including AI and machine learning. The accolades of its faculty (current and former) include leadership roles such as president of the National Science Foundation and the International Society of Advanced Cytometry, and as membership in the National Institutes of Health Council of Councils. They have received numerous prestigious awards, including the Overton Prize, Guggenheim Fellowship, Okawa Award, United States Air Force Young Investigator Award, Presidential Young Investigator Award, NSF CAREER Award, Sloan Fellowship, and New Innovator's Award from the NIH, among others. Additionally, faculty members have been elected to the National Academy of Sciences, Association of Computing Machinery, American Association for the Advancement of Science, and the International Society of Computational Biology.

As part of the HHMI-NIBIB Interfaces Initiative, CBD received funding from Howard Hughes Medical Institute and the National Institute of Biomedical Imaging and Bioengineering (NIBIB) to develop an interdisciplinary Ph.D. program in computational biology with the University of Pittsburgh, which was founded as the Joint CMU-Pitt Ph.D. Program in Computational Biology in 2005. This program is currently receiving training support through a National Institutes of Health T32 Training Grant. CBD is the home of the B.S. in Computational Biology, one of the four B.S. degree programs within Carnegie Mellon School of Computer Science.

CBD is the home of an NIH Center for the HuBMAP Integration, Visualization & Engaging (HIVE) Initiative led by Ziv Bar-Joseph and an NIH Center for Multiscale Analysis of 4D Nucleome Structure and Function by Comprehensive Multimodal Data Integration led by Jian Ma.

CBD houses the Center for AI-Driven Biomedical Research (AI4BIO) at CMU, a catalyst for innovations at the intersection of AI and biomedicine across the School of Computer Science and campus.

== Notable faculty ==
- Robert F. Murphy (founding department head)
- Russell Schwartz (former department head)
- Ziv Bar-Joseph
- Jaime Carbonell
- Jian Ma (interim head)
- Kathryn Roeder
- Roni Rosenfeld
- Eric Xing

== Degree programs ==
- Joint CMU-Pitt Ph.D. Program in Computational Biology (with University of Pittsburgh)
- M.S. in Computational Biology (joint with the Department of Biological Sciences)
- M.S. in Automated Science
- B.S. in Computational Biology
- Minor in Computational Biology
