= Ray Lane =

Ray Lane may refer to:

- Ray Lane (sportscaster) (1930–2025), American sportscaster
- Raymond J. Lane (born 1946), American business executive

== See also ==
- Raymond Lane (disambiguation)
