= Raymond Lane =

Raymond Lane may refer to:

- Raymond Aloysius Lane (1894–1974), American Roman Catholic missionary and bishop
- Raymond J. Lane (born 1946), American business executive and strategist
- Raymond Lane Jr., sculptor

== See also ==
- Ray Lane (disambiguation)
