= Angel G. Jordan =

Angel G. Jordan (born as Ángel Jordán Goñi; September 19, 1930 – August 4, 2017) was a Spanish-born American electronics and computer engineer known as the founder of the Software Engineering Institute (SEI) and co-founder of the Robotics Institute at Carnegie Mellon University (CMU) and served on its faculty for 55 years, since 2003 as Emeritus. He was instrumental in the formation of the School of Computer Science (SCS) at Carnegie Mellon. He has made contributions to technology transfer and institutional development. He served as Dean of Carnegie Mellon College of Engineering and later as the provost of Carnegie Mellon University.

== Early life and education ==
He was born in Pamplona, Spain, in 1930 and raised in Ansó until he was 9 years old. He then moved to Zaragoza where he did his secondary education in the Institute Goya and later his university education in the University of Zaragoza where he obtained the degree of Licenciado en Ciencias Físicas in 1952. During 1952-56 he moved to Madrid where he worked as a research engineer in the Laboratorio y Taller de Investigación del Estado Mayor de la Armada (LTIEMA). He emigrated to the US in 1956 with his wife Nieves, and enrolled at CMU as a graduate teaching assistant in the Department of Electrical Engineering. He received his PhD in Electrical Engineering from Carnegie Mellon in 1959.

== Career ==
At (LTIEMA), in Madrid, Spain, during the period 1952–56, he conducted basic and applied research in Servomechanisms and Electronics engineering technology for the Spanish Navy. He introduced the foundations of semiconductor devices and Electronics engineering technology in the Spanish equivalent of the United States Naval Research Laboratory. As a research fellow at Mellon Institute of Industrial Research in 1951–52, he conducted basic and applied research in semiconductor Photo-diodes and solar cells. This work resulted in technology implemented in an industrial company.

As a researcher and faculty member at Carnegie Mellon University, he has made numerous scientific and technical contributions in semiconductor devices and materials science and engineering, including: tunnel diodes, junction devices, photodiodes, high frequency semiconductor devices, behavior of semiconductor devices at low temperatures, noise in semiconductor devices, effects of imperfections in the electrical properties of Semiconductors, radiation damage in Semiconductors, thin films, gas detection devices, semiconductor metal Oxide, and Microprocessor controlled systems.

These contributions have made advances in the understanding and theory of semiconductor phenomena and devices, and have contributed to technological developments that have made impacts on Microelectronics, environmental monitoring and control, biomedical instrumentation, coal mining safety, and automated systems. He has published extensively in refereed journals. He has written numerous reports and monographs, and has made numerous presentations at national and international meetings.

As a faculty member in the Department of Electrical Engineering, now Department of Electrical and Computer Engineering (ECE) he was instrumental in building one of the country's first and finest university laboratories in solid state devices. In this laboratory, a large number of graduate students completed doctoral work in the period 1958-1990 while he was active in the department. He supervised many of them and launched them and numerous master students to illustrious careers. He attracted considerable funding from the government and industry. He taught many undergraduate and graduate courses. As a department head of ECE he extended areas in which this department was prominent; recognized and fostered new areas, such as computer-aided design, computer hardware, robotics, and optoelectronics; initiated new interdisciplinary programs, such as magnetic devices and electronic materials; and propelled the department to a leading position (in seven years the funded research support more than quadrupled and the level of enrollment and quality in both undergraduate and graduate programs increased substantially). He participated in the foundation of the Department of Computer Science at CMU, one of the leading departments of its kind in the nation.

As dean of Carnegie Institute of Technology, the engineering college, he extended the scope of the Engineering Design Research Center; led all departments to higher levels of excellence; introduced manufacturing and automation in the research and educational programs of several engineering departments; was a leading force in the formation of the Robotics Institute, encouraging participation in it from computer science, all engineering departments, and the Graduate School of Industrial Administration, now the Tepper School of Business. The Robotics Institute is now the largest of its kind in the US); supported the formation of the interdisciplinary Magnetics Technology Center now Data Storage Systems Center (one of the few, and the largest center of its kind, in the US, funded by industry and government agencies); fostered close cooperation among departments and centers; and led the college to a dramatic increase in funded research. As faculty member, department head, and dean he participated in educational and search committees, inside and outside his department or college, and in university-wide committees with the central administration. In concert with the Development Office and the President, he participated in a development campaign for the college to raise funding for renovations, construction, equipment, and facilities. As dean of the engineering college and later as provost of CMU, he led the faculties of the Carnegie Institute of Technology and the Graduate School of Industrial Administration in putting together innovative curriculums in integrated manufacturing systems engineering and management to educate a new breed of manufacturing engineers and managers. He was a co-author of the report by the Business-Higher Education Forum entitled, "The New Manufacturing: America's Race to Automate."

As a technology leader, he was the founder and first chairman of the Pittsburgh High Technology Council, now Pittsburgh Technology Council an organization to help change Pittsburgh from a smoke-stack city to a high-technology city. He is now emeritus on its board of directors. As member (appointed by the Governor) of the Pennsylvania Science and Engineering Foundation, he was one of the leading forces in creating and launching the Ben Franklin Partnership Program, now the Ben Franklin Technology Partners of Pennsylvania.

As provost of Carnegie Mellon, he fostered close cooperation among colleges. All the research programs in CMU expanded. He fostered close cooperation between the School of Computer Science (in whose formation he played a leading role) at CMU and the rest of the university, particularly the Dietrich College of Humanities and Social Sciences. For example, the Computational Linguistics Program, whose locus is in the Philosophy Department, is based on linguistics, philosophy, and computer science. A large research institute based in computational linguistics is the Center for Machine Translation, now Language Technologies Institute, funded by government agencies and industry, which then reported directly to the provost because of its university-wide scope. The engineering college and the Graduate School of Industrial Administration, now the Tepper School of Business collaborate in interdisciplinary programs in manufacturing and information technologies. He was an active participant in development and fund raising and supported the President and the Development Office, now University Advancement, in a development campaigns for the university. He himself has been instrumental in attracting to CMU a number of endowed professorships and gifts and grants from individuals, foundations, and corporations.

He was the orchestrator and driving force behind the national campaign to attract the Software Engineering Institute to CMU and to Pittsburgh. This federally funded research and development center (FFRDC), is to enhance the productivity of software development and set the standards of software engineering for the Department of Defense and industrial corporations. This institute, together with the School of Computer Science and the Engineering College at CMU, are acting as catalysts for spin-offs to attract a large number of software companies to Pittsburgh and Western Pennsylvania. During two periods of transition in the Software Engineering Institute, he served as its acting director.

In 1986 CMU attracted to its Engineering College a national Engineering Research Center block funded by NSF. It was named the Engineering Design Research Center, now Institute for Complex Engineered Systems (ICES), and was based on the Design Research Center and the Robotics Institute, both programs launched and nurtured when Dr. Jordan was dean of engineering. A second Engineering Research Center funded by NSF was later attracted. It is now named the Data Storage Systems Center, based on the Magnetics Technology Center, established when Dr. Jordan was dean of engineering.

He fostered research collaborations between Carnegie Mellon University and the University of Pittsburgh in areas where the two institutions complemented each other. For example, in magnetic resonance and in cancer research between CMU's Biological Sciences and Computer Science Departments and Pitt's Medical School; in biomedical informatics between CMU's Computational Linguistics and the Center for Machine Translation, now Department of Machine Learning, and Pitt's Linguistics Department and the Medical School. Under the umbrella of MPC, at the time the Mellon Pittsburgh Corporation, the two institutions formed the Pittsburgh Supercomputing Center, at the time one of the five supercomputing centers in the nation funded by the National Science Foundation. Because of its university-wide scope this center reported directly to the Provost.

While department head of Electrical and Computer Engineering he reorganized the interdisciplinary Biomedical Engineering Program in the college of engineering and served as acting chairman fostering collaborations between the program and the medical school at the University of Pittsburgh and between the program and Allegheny Singer Research Institute (the basic and clinical research branch of Allegheny General Hospital). He continued fostering these collaborations as dean of engineering, and as provost he expanded them to include collaborations between Allegheny Singer Research Institute and CMU's science and engineering colleges, the Robotics Institute and the School of Computer Science. He served on the research committee of Allegheny Singer Research Institute and on its board of directors. He also served on the board of directors of the Allegheny Heart Institute (a division of Allegheny General Hospital) and chaired its Research Committee.

As department head, dean, and provost, he has initiated and encouraged industry university research partnerships, local, national, and international. He has been a leading force in technology transition with the university acting as source for economic development in Pittsburgh and Western Pennsylvania. In addition to his role in the Pittsburgh High Technology Council, he played an important role in the formation and implementation of the Enterprise Corporation (where he was on its board of directors), whose mission is to help start new companies in Greater Pittsburgh; participated in the conversion of the Jones and Laughlin Steel Site into an Industrial Park, the Pittsburgh High Technology Center, which attracted advanced technology companies to Pittsburgh, some of them to work closely with Carnegie Mellon University; served on the Allegheny County Airport Advisory Commission for the construction and expansion of the Mid-Field Terminal; and has worked with community groups in Pittsburgh and Pennsylvania to foster economic development through education and technology. He was active in a number of community action groups and served on the board of directors (or trustees) of several non-profit corporations.

== Other activities and honors ==
As a faculty member and later as a university administrator he has been a consultant to industry, universities, and government agencies, in the US and abroad. He has served on the board of directors of three companies, served on the Science Advisory Committee of two others, was a director or trustee of several not-for-profit organizations, and served on visiting committees or board of visitors of several universities. He is the recipient of a Doctor Honoris Causa from the Universidad Politécnica de Madrid, Universidad Pública de Navarra and Universidad Carlos III de Madrid Spain. He is the recipient of an Enterprise Award presented by the Pittsburgh Business Times "in recognition of his foresight and leadership in bringing the Software Engineering Institute to Pittsburgh". He is a Fellow of the IEEE and Fellow of the AAAS. He is a Distinguished Fulbright Scholar and was made the 1987 Vectors Pittsburgh Man of the Year in Education. He is a member of the American Physics Society. He was elected a Member of the National Academy of Engineering with the citation, "For contributions to solid-state device research and for innovative leadership in engineering education."

He has lectured extensively in American universities and abroad on interdisciplinary education, industry/university relations, technology transfer, and strategic planning; has fostered and participated in collaborative efforts between CMU and universities and research establishments abroad; and has initiated a number of international research and educational programs in science and technology and in the humanities and social sciences.
