= Some Institutes for Advanced Study =

Consortium of institutes for advanced study

The Some Institutes for Advanced Study (SIAS) consortium organizes ten "institutes for advanced study" founded on the same principles as the Institute for Advanced Study in Princeton, New Jersey. The members are:

- Institute for Advanced Study in Princeton, New Jersey, United States
- Center for Advanced Study in the Behavioral Sciences in Stanford, California, U.S.
- National Humanities Center in Durham County, North Carolina, U.S.
- Radcliffe Institute for Advanced Study in Cambridge, Massachusetts, U.S.
- Netherlands Institute for Advanced Study in Amsterdam, Netherlands
- Swedish Collegium for Advanced Study in Uppsala, Sweden
- Berlin Institute for Advanced Study in Berlin, Germany
- Israel Institute for Advanced Studies in Jerusalem
- Nantes Institute for Advanced Study Foundation in Nantes, France
- Stellenbosch Institute for Advanced Study in Stellenbosch, South Africa

== Overview ==
SIAS members were founded explicitly to follow the Princeton model (with certain variations—not all maintain a permanent faculty, for instance), and place an emphasis on granting one-year fellowships. According to Bjorn Wittrock (2003), the Princeton institute model was "like a traditional university…devoted to the promotion of learning, but its scale was smaller and it did not offer formal instruction. Nor did it have large laboratories. It was to be a place for the most highly specialised research, yet provide an atmosphere open to intellectual exchange across all disciplinary boundaries".

The SIAS consortium has stated several conditions any candidate institution should fulfill in order to be accepted as a new member:

1. "It should be a true place for advanced study in terms of a commitment to the highest standards of scholarship",
2. "It must offer a genuine and competitive fellowship programme - and, one may add, a programme where each individual candidate is subjected to a thorough assessment, not just accepted as part of a thematic group of scholars or selected by the convener of such a group",
3. "Its funding should be stable enough to ensure that it will continue to operate into the foreseeable future", and
4. "The institution should be part of the academic system but be independent and not be narrowly directed by any single university, or by any commercial enterprise or government department".
