= Dave rule =

Silicon Valley inside joke about the workplace gender gap

The Dave rule is an inside joke in Silicon Valley startup culture that posits that if a work team includes as many women as it does people named Dave, it has achieved acceptable gender balance. The joke is a reference to Silicon Valley's infamous gender gap.

The concept was in use in the Carnegie Mellon School of Computer Science under the name "Dave-to-girl ratio" or "Dave-to-female ratio" at least as early as 1999. It was first documented in Silicon Valley, which employs many Carnegie Mellon SCS alumni, under the name "Dave rule" in 2014 by Guardian newspaper correspondent Rory Carroll in an article about a sexual harassment lawsuit filed against dating application startup Tinder by a female former executive.
