= Robotics Institute at Carnegie Mellon University =

Division of the School of Computer Science at Carnegie Mellon University

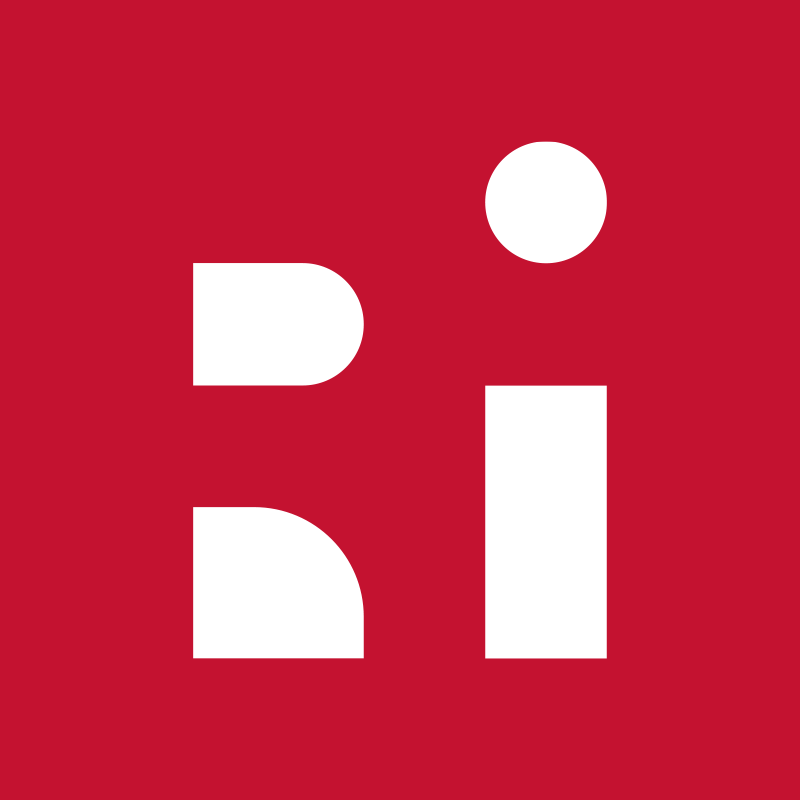
- Type: Private nonprofit research institute
- Established: 1979; 47 years ago
- Parent institution: Carnegie Mellon University
- Location: Pittsburgh, Pennsylvania, U.S. 40°26′35.7″N 79°56′44.8″W
- Campus: Urban
- Website: ri.cmu.edu

The Robotics Institute at Carnegie Mellon University is an academic department within the School of Computer Science at Carnegie Mellon University, a private research university in Pittsburgh, Pennsylvania. The Robotics Institute is widely acknowledged as being among the world’s top robotics research institutions. It is noted for its work in computer vision. autonomous vehicles. space exploration. disaster relief. and assistive robotics.

The Robotics Institute has facilities on Carnegie Mellon’s campus in the Gates and Hillman Centers and Newell-Simon Hall, and in the Squirrel Hill, Lawrenceville, and Hazelwood neighborhoods of Pittsburgh.

== History ==
The Robotics Institute was the first academic department in the world devoted exclusively to robotics. It was founded in 1979 by Carnegie Mellon University professors Raj Reddy and Angel Jordan, with the assistance of a $3 million grant from the Westinghouse Corporation. Reddy served as its founding director from 1979 to 1991.

The Robotics Institute introduced a Ph.D. program in 1988, also the first of its kind. Carnegie Mellon became the first computer science school to offer an undergraduate robotics major when it added that program in 2023. To that point, robotics had mostly been the domain of engineering.

RI is home to three research centers: the National Robotics Engineering Center (NREC), the Field Robotics Center (FRC), and the Extended Reality Technology Center (XRTC).

=== National Robotics Engineering Center ===
Established in 1994, and supported by a $2.5m NASA seed grant, the National Robotics Engineering Center (NREC) is an operating unit within the Robotics Institute that works with government and industry clients to apply robotic technologies to real-world processes and products, including unmanned vehicle and platform design, autonomy, sensing and image processing, machine learning, manipulation, and human–robot interaction.

=== Field Robotics Center ===
Established in 1994, the Field Robotics Center (FRC) researches, develops, and builds mobile robots for use in field environments, such as natural terrain, agricultural settings, subterranean environments, underwater, and other work sites.

=== Robotics Innovation Center ===
CMU launched the Robotics Innovation Center (RIC) in February 2026.

=== Mill 19 ===
Mill 19 is a repurposed steel mill located at the Hazelwood Green site along the Monongahela River. The facility was built in 2019 to support larger projects needing industrial-sized space.

== Notable work ==
=== Autonomous vehicles ===
The Robotics Institute has been at the forefront of research on self-driving vehicles since it began working on Navlab in the mid-1980s as part of the DARPA Strategic Computing Initiative. Navlab consisted of a series of vehicles designed for varying purposes, including off-road scouting, automated highway driving, and driver assistance in crowded city environments. In 1995, Navlab 5 autonomously traversed 2,849 miles from Pittsburgh to San Diego on a road trip that researchers Dean Pomerleau and Todd Jochem called “No Hands Across America".

In the 2005 DARPA Grand Challenge, CMU vehicles Sandstorm and H1ghlander finished in second and third place, respectively. The RI-based Tartan Racing team won the 2007 DARPA Grand Challenge with their vehicle, a modified Chevrolet Tahoe called Boss. Boss completed the 55-mile course in just over 4 hours and 20 minutes to win the $2 million top prize.

RI faculty and graduate students made up Team Explorer, which competed in the DARPA Subterranean Challenge between 2019 and 2021. Team Explorer won the tunnel circuit event and placed second in the urban circuit before finishing fourth in the final event.

=== Space exploration ===
Andy, a four-wheeled, solar-powered lunar rover named for university founders Andrew Carnegie and Andrew Mellon, was unveiled in 2014 as part of the competition for the Google Lunar X Prize.

In January 2024, Iris, a shoebox-sized lunar rover designed and built entirely by CMU students, was part of the payload aboard Astrobotic Technology’s Peregrine lunar lander. Carnegie Mellon installed a mission control center on campus for Iris, as well as planned future space missions. A propellant leak prevented the lander from reaching the moon and deploying the rover.

Another RI-built lunar rover, MoonRanger, is scheduled to be part of a Moon mission in 2029.

=== Assistive robotics ===
HERB (Home Exploring Robot Butler) was an autonomous mobile robot designed and built in the Personal Robotics Lab that was capable of delicately manipulating objects to assist with household tasks. In 2013, a video of HERB separating an Oreo cookie was part of the brand’s “Cookie vs. Creme” campaign.

In 2015, RI’s Cognitive Assistance Lab launched NavCog, a smartphone app which used computer vision and a network of Bluetooth beacons to help visually impaired users navigate spaces.

RI faculty member Christopher G. Atkeson’s work on soft robotics for human interaction in nursing homes directly inspired the design of Baymax, the health care robot in the 2014 animated Disney movie Big Hero 6.

=== Exploration and disaster relief ===
In 1983, a team from RI led by faculty member Red Whittaker sent a four-wheeled robot called Workhorse to Three-Mile Island to assist in the cleanup following the partial nuclear meltdown that occurred there in 1979.

Nomad, an autonomous four-wheeled robot built in RI’s Field Robotics Center in the late 1990s, searched for meteorites in Antarctica in 2000. Over the course of 10 days, Nomad studied about 50 indigenous rocks and identified three meteorites in-situ.

Zoë, a solar-powered autonomous robot designed to detect microorganisms, trekked 120 miles through Chile’s Atacama desert in 2004, mapping signs of life.

In 2015, CHIMP, a 5-foot-11-inch humanoid robot designed and built by RI-based team Tartan Rescue, finished third in the DARPA Robotics Challenge.

== Notable faculty ==
- Chris Atkeson
- Howie Choset
- Jessica Hodgins
- Matthew Johnson-Roberson
- Takeo Kanade
- Pradeep Khosla
- Matt Mason
- Hans Moravec
- Raj Reddy
- Katia Sycara
- Sebastian Thrun
- David Touretzky
- Manuela Veloso
- Red Whittaker

== Patents ==
- Field Robotics Center patents
- NREC patents
