= Raymond J. Lane =

American business executive (born 1946)

- Born: December 26, 1946 (age 79); McKeesport, Pennsylvania
- Occupations: Entrepreneur, consultant
- Known for: Investment Strategy, Business Consulting, Technology, Alternative Energy
- Title: Managing Partners at GreatPoint Ventures
- Spouse: Stephanie
- Children: 5
- Website: KPCB

Raymond J. Lane (born December 26, 1946) is an American business executive and strategist specializing in technology and finance. Lane is best known for assisting corporations with technology strategy, organizational development, team building, and sales and growth management.

Lane led a "go to market" overhaul of Oracle Corporation, which led to an increase in sales and its stock price in the 1990s. He is cited as being the catalyst for "Oracle's success, ‘past, present and future.’"

Lane is a partner emeritus at Kleiner, Perkins, Caufield & Byers, a venture capital firm in Silicon Valley. He managed investments and held board memberships in startup companies, and was involved in the development of enterprise technology and alternative energy.

== Early life and education ==
Raymond Jay Lane was born on December 26, 1946, in McKeesport, Pennsylvania, near Pittsburgh. Lane grew up in rural western Pennsylvania where his father was employed as a design engineer for steel production plants. Lane was heavily influenced by his father, who had emerged from the Depression-era steel business as the first member of his family to go to college, graduating from Carnegie Mellon as a mechanical engineer.

Lane attended public schools, graduating from Moon High School in 1964. Wishing to follow in his father's footsteps, Lane first pursued a degree in aeronautical engineering at West Virginia University (WVU). He later changed his major and graduated with a bachelor's degree in mathematics in 1968.

== Career ==
=== IBM ===
After graduating, Lane joined IBM's data processing division in a sales position. In 1969, Lane was drafted by the U.S. Army, and assigned to the 1st Infantry Division at Fort Riley, Kansas. Because of his computer knowledge, he was made a systems analyst responsible for logistical computer systems. He completed two years of military service and resumed his career at IBM in 1971, achieving top sales awards for three years and being promoted to a product manager responsible for large mainframe and storage systems in one of IBM's largest regions.

=== Electronic Data Systems ===
After eight years with IBM, Lane was recruited by Electronic Data Systems (EDS), led at the time by Ross Perot. He was given responsibility for a new division that provided services to large manufacturers, distributors, and retail and transportation companies. Lane ran the new division for nearly four years.

=== Booz Allen Hamilton ===
In 1981 Lane accepted a principal position with Booz Allen Hamilton in Chicago. At Booz Allen, he helped develop information technology strategies. Lane became a partner in three years and a senior partner by 1986. He led the development in the late 1980s of what became known as Information Systems Group, one of two functional practices, and four industry practices that were the firm's primary organization. He sat on the firm's executive committee and board of directors from 1987 to 1992.

=== Oracle ===
After Oracle Corporation in the early 1990s experienced serious financial issues, Lane was recruited in 1992 to turn around the firm's sales, service, consulting and marketing, and named president of Oracle USA in June. Oracle, suffering from rapid growth in the late '80s without checks and balances on its customer practices, was also falling behind technologically. The rapid turnaround in the mid-90s, fueled by a new database technology, Oracle 7, and by Lane's organization of sales and services at the company, led to the rise of Oracle's business applications division. Apple founder Steve Jobs recalled that "Larry [Ellison] told me that 15 minutes into the meeting, he knew Ray was the only guy he had met who was near smart enough to run Oracle". In 1996, Lane was named the president and chief operating officer of Oracle. Lane and Jeff Henley brought what a rival described as "professional management and responsible people of integrity" to the company, and what Oracle's Jerry Held described as "bring in the adults". Under his leadership, along with Ellison and Henley, Oracle expanded from 7,500 to 40,000 employees, defeating its main database rivals Sybase and Informix, to become the leader in the database industry while building major businesses in ERP applications and consulting. In mid-2000, Lane suddenly left the company, leading to speculation Oracle's business needs had outgrown him.

=== Kleiner Perkins Caufield & Byers ===
In 2000, Lane accepted a position with Kleiner Perkins Caufield & Byers (KPCB). Lane's work at KPCB centered on enterprise technology and alternative energy. As of 2013 Lane became partner emeritus of Kleiner Perkins. He serves as chairman of the board of Elance, an online staffing platform, and of Aquion Energy.

=== Hewlett-Packard ===
Lane served as non-executive chairman on Hewlett-Packard (HP)'s board of directors from 2010 to 2011, and as executive chairman from 2011 to 2013. Lane restructured the board to add seven new directors, replaced the short-tenured CEO Leo Apotheker, and led the placement of Meg Whitman as CEO. Lane was chairman when HP decided to acquire Autonomy Corporation, a controversial acquisition that led him to step down as chairman, but remain on the board of directors.

=== GreatPoint Ventures ===
Lane served as a Managing Partner at GreatPoint Ventures, a venture capital firm headquartered in San Francisco.

=== Tax dispute ===
In 2013, it was reported that Lane was involved in a personal tax dispute. The case stemmed from a tax year 2000 audit that reviewed an investment in a tax strategy used by Lane's advisors called POPS (Partnership Option Portfolio Securities) to offset a minority of Lane's income. Lane agreed to settle in excess of $100 million.

On January 3, 2014, Lane filed a lawsuit against Deutsche Bank, and BDO Seidman, LLP alleging that he had suffered damage as a result of their having designed an allegedly "fraudulent" tax shelter.

== Personal life and philanthropy ==
Lane has three children, Kristi, Kelley, and Kari, with his first wife, Donna. He is married to Stephanie (Herle) Lane, with whom he has two children, Raymond Jay Lane III ("RJay") and Catherine Victoria ("Tori").

Lane is actively involved in philanthropic endeavors, with a focus on higher education, the Special Olympics, and Cancer Research.

As the chairman of the board of trustees of Carnegie Mellon University, Lane spearheaded the institution's capital campaign and played a pivotal role in establishing its Silicon Valley campus in 2002. A significant contribution came in 2010 when the Lanes funded Carnegie Mellon's Computational Biology program (The Lane Center for Computational Biology), which has since involved into the Computational Biology Department, one of seven degree-granting departments in the School of Computer Science. Additionally, Lane endowed a professorship chair (The Ray and Stephanie Lane Endowed Professorship), initially held by Robert F. Murphy, the founding head of the Computational Biology Department. The chair is currently held by Jian Ma.

Lane also supports his alma mater, West Virginia University (WVU), where he serves on its board of governors. He led a WVU capital campaign in the early 2000s. In recognition of a $5 million donation by the Lanes in September 2007, aimed at bolstering the university's Computer Science and Electrical Engineering programs, WVU named the department The Lane Department of Computer Science and Electrical Engineering.

Lane served as vice chairman of Special Olympics International for several years. In October 2011, Ray and Stephanie funded the organization's international expansion project, Unify, aimed at fostering inclusivity by bringing together school-aged youth with intellectual disabilities and their non-disabled peers.

Ray and Stephanie Lane are also contributors to the American Cancer Society, organizing and sponsoring events to raise funds. They initiated and funded the Stephanie H. Lane Cancer Research Network in California, dedicated to providing cancer patients with essential information and treatment resources.

== Recognition ==
- TechAmerica, "David Packard Lifetime Medal of Achievement," 2011.
- Inducted into West Virginia University's Business Hall of Fame (2003) Academy of Distinguished Alumni (2004) and the Order of the Vandalia (2005).
- Smithsonian Leadership Award for Collaborative Innovation, 2001.
- Kappa Sigma Man of the Year, 2000.
- Honorary Ph.D.'s, West Virginia University, Golden Gate University.
- West Virginia University, Lane Department of Computer Science and Electrical Engineering.
- Carnegie Mellon, Lane Center for Computational Cancer Research.
