= Yan Liu (computer scientist) =

Chinese-American computer scientist

Yan Liu (刘燕） is a computer scientist whose research focuses on machine learning for time series, explainable machine learning, physics-informed AI, and their applications to climate modeling, transportation planning, social media, and biomedicine. She is Fletcher Jones Foundation Endowed Chair Professor in the Departments of Computer Science, Electrical and Computer Engineering, and Biomedical Sciences in the USC Viterbi School of Engineering of the University of Southern California.

== Education and career ==
Liu received a bachelor's degree in 2001 from the Peking University Department of Computer Science and Technology. She continued her studies in computer science at Carnegie Mellon University, where she received a master's degree in 2004 and completed her Ph.D. in 2007. Her dissertation, Conditional Graphical Models for Protein Structure Prediction, supervised by Professor Jaime Carbonell, received the honorable mention of ACM Doctoral Dissertation Award.

She was a research staff member at IBM Thomas J. Watson Research Center in Yorktown Heights, New York, from 2006 to 2010. In 2010 she joined the University of Southern California as an assistant professor of computer science. She was promoted to associate professor in 2016, and promoted to full professor in 2021. She was a visiting faculty at Google in 2022 to 2023, and is currently an Amazon Scholar.

== Recognition ==
Liu was named to the 2026 class of IEEE Fellows, "for contributions to the methodology and application of machine learning and data mining". She was also named as AAAI Fellow, for "significant contributions to machine learning and development of widely recognized models for time series and spatiotemporal data analysis".
