= Matthew Johnson-Roberson =

American roboticist, researcher, entrepreneur and educator

- Education: University of Sydney; Carnegie Mellon University
- Awards: NSF CAREER award
- Scientific career
- Fields: Robotics; Computer Vision; Artificial Intelligence
- Workplaces: University of Michigan; Carnegie Mellon University; Vanderbilt University

Matthew Johnson-Roberson is an American roboticist, researcher, entrepreneur, and educator. He is the dean of Vanderbilt University’s College of Connected Computing, and previously was director of the Robotics Institute at Carnegie Mellon University and a professor at the University of Michigan College of Engineering, where he co-directed the UM Ford Center for Autonomous Vehicles (FCAV) with Ram Vasudevan. His research focuses on computer vision and artificial intelligence, with the specific applications of autonomous underwater vehicles and self-driving cars. He is also the co-founder and CTO of Refraction AI, a company focused on providing autonomous last mile delivery.

== Education ==
Johnson-Roberson received his Bachelor's degree in computer science from Carnegie Mellon University in 2005 and his doctorate in robotics from the University of Sydney in 2010.

== Career and research ==
After completing his PhD, Johnson-Roberson held postdoctoral appointments at both the Australian Centre for Field Robotics and the Centre for Autonomous Systems (CAS) at KTH Royal Institute of Technology. Following his postdoctoral positions, he joined the University of Michigan College of Engineering in 2013 as a professor in the Naval Architecture and Marine Engineering department with a joint appointment in Computer Science and Engineering. From January 2022 through April 2025 he served as the sixth director of the Robotics Institute at Carnegie Mellon University. On 1 May 2025 he became the inaugural Dean of the College of Connected Computing at Vanderbilt University.

Johnson-Roberson's research interests center around autonomous vehicles, including both underwater and ground vehicles. This focus leads to publications in Computer vision, Control theory and Artificial intelligence. At Michigan, Johnson-Roberson founded the DROP (Deep Robot Optical Perception) Lab, which conducts research to advance perception capabilities for autonomous systems operating in dynamic environments, especially in the areas of 3D reconstruction, segmentation, data mining, and visualization. This research aims to enable scientists to remotely access scientific sites through abstractions and reconstructions. Johnson-Roberson also co-directs the UM Ford Center for Autonomous Vehicles (FCAV), which researches technologies for autonomous driving.

In addition to his academic work, Johnson-Roberson also co-founded and serves as the CTO of Refraction AI, a start-up focused on providing autonomous last-mile delivery. Refraction began a pilot delivery program with their REV-1 autonomous vehicle in Ann Arbor, Michigan in 2020 to deliver takeout and groceries.

== Awards and honors ==
Johnson-Roberson was a recipient of the NSF CAREER award in 2015 for work in 3D reconstruction in underwater environments with AUVs (Autonomous Underwater Vehicles).

== Selected publications ==
- W. Zhi, H. Tang, T. Zhang and M. Johnson-Roberson, "Unifying Representation and Calibration With 3D Foundation Models," in IEEE Robotics and Automation Letters, vol. 9, no. 10, pp. 8953-8960, Oct. 2024. https://doi.org/10.1109/LRA.2024.3451396
- J. Zhang, M. S. Ramanagopal, R. Vasudevan and M. Johnson-Roberson, "LiStereo: Generate Dense Depth Maps from LIDAR and Stereo Imagery," 2020 IEEE International Conference on Robotics and Automation (ICRA), Paris, France, 2020, pp. 7829-7836. https://doi.org/10.1109/ICRA40945.2020.9196628
- M. Yu, R. Vasudevan and M. Johnson-Roberson, "Occlusion-Aware Risk Assessment for Autonomous Driving in Urban Environments," in IEEE Robotics and Automation Letters, vol. 4, no. 2, pp. 2235-2241, April 2019. https://doi.org/10.1109/LRA.2019.2900453
- M. S. Ramanagopal, C. Anderson, R. Vasudevan and M. Johnson-Roberson, "Failing to Learn: Autonomously Identifying Perception Failures for Self-Driving Cars," in IEEE Robotics and Automation Letters, vol. 3, no. 4, pp. 3860-3867, Oct. 2018. https://doi.org/10.1109/LRA.2018.2857402
