= Rita Singh =

Indian and American computer scientist

Rita Singh is an Indian and American computer scientist. Educated in India, she works in the US as a research professor in the Language Technologies Institute of the Carnegie Mellon University School of Computer Science, where she is the founding director of the Center for Voice Intelligence and Security. She works in speech processing, and is an expert on speaker recognition and on speech forensics, determining the likely characteristics of a human speaker from samples of their speech. She is the author of the book Profiling Humans from their Voice (Springer, 2019).

== Education and career ==
Singh was a student at Banaras Hindu University in India, where she received a bachelor's degree in physics and a master's degree in geophysics. She completed her Ph.D. in 1996 at the National Geophysical Research Institute in Hyderabad, with a dissertation involving nonlinear systems in geophysics.

After continuing her research as a postdoctoral scholar at the Tata Institute of Fundamental Research from 1996 to 1997, she joined Carnegie Mellon University in the US in 1997, and began working there on speech processing.

== Recognition ==
Singh was recognized as a Fellow of the International Speech Communication Association in 2026, "for pioneering advancements in human voice profiling and computational voice forensics".
