= Israel Institute for Advanced Studies =

Research institute in Jerusalem

Institute for Advanced Studies
- המכון ללימודים מתקדמים
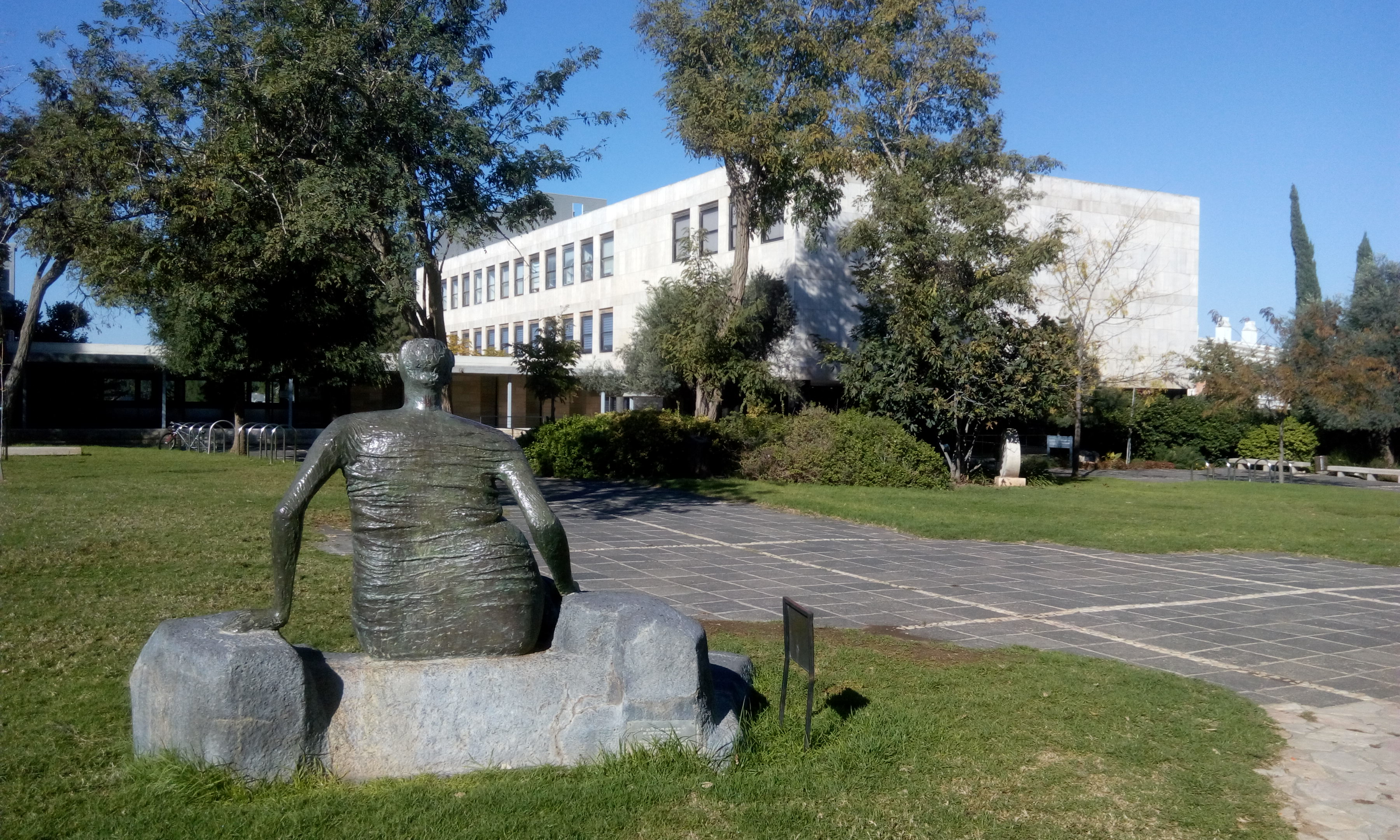
- Israel Institute for Advanced Studies
- Established: 1975; 51 years ago
- Field of research: Physics, mathematics, life sciences, economics, comparative religion
- Director: Yitzhak Hen
- Location: Edmond J. Safra Campus; Givat Ram, Jerusalem; 9190401; 31°46′41″N 35°11′46″E
- Affiliations: SIAS
- Operating agency: Hebrew University of Jerusalem
- Website: as.huji.ac.il

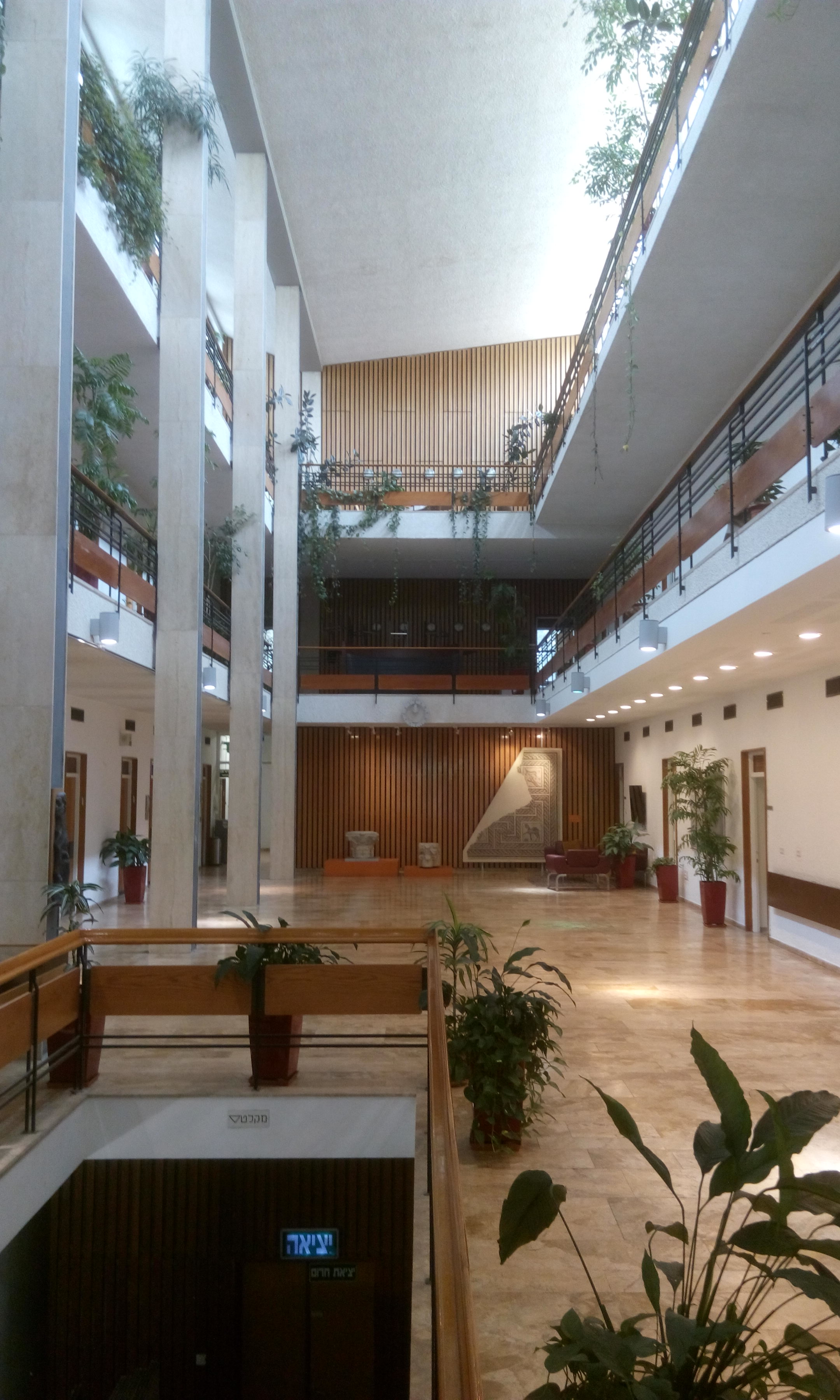
View of the main atrium in the Israel Institute for Advanced Studies building

The Israel Institute for Advanced Studies (Hebrew: הַמָכוֹן לְלִימוּדִים מִתְקַדְמִים; IIAS, or IAS in Israel) is a research institute in Jerusalem, devoted to academic research in physics, mathematics, the life sciences, economics, and comparative religion. It is a self-governing body, both in its administrative function as well as its academic pursuits. It is one of the ten members of the symposium Some Institutes for Advanced Study (SIAS).

The IIAS is located at the Edmond J. Safra Campus of the Hebrew University of Jerusalem in Givat Ram. The Institute brings together scholars from around the world to engage in collaborative research projects for periods of four to twelve months. Throughout over forty years of existence it has been dedicated to unrestricted academic research.

== History ==
The Institute for Advanced Studies in Jerusalem was founded in 1975 by Israeli mathematician Aryeh Dvoretzky, winner of the Israel Prize for Mathematics. Visits to the Institute for Advanced Study in Princeton, New Jersey inspired Prof. Dvoretzky to establish an IAS in Jerusalem in 1975. In March, 1976 Dvoretzky wrote:

The Institute is similar in concept to several existing Institutes of Advanced Study, notably the Princeton Institute. An IAS in Israel will fulfill a long-acknowledged need for an appropriate setting to encourage scientific and academic leadership, along with promoting the highest standard of research. The proliferation of universities in Israel, along with the overall trend toward mass higher education, has heightened the need for an IAS here in Israel. The inspiration and achievement of these Institutes are essential to strengthening and advancing Israel's scientific and academic landscape.

In 1982, Yuval Ne'eman, Professor of Physics and Minister of Science, established the first School in Theoretical Physics at the Jerusalem IAS. Prof. Steven Weinberg, Nobel laureate in Physics, was asked to become the director of the School, a post he held for twelve years. Four additional Schools were established, based on the same model, in the following fields: Economics, Life Sciences, Jewish Studies and Comparative Religion, and Mathematics. Each School is headed by a preeminent scholar in his or her field.

== Directors ==
- Aryeh Dvoretzky (1975–1985)
- Menahem Yaari (1986-1989, 1990-1992)
- Hanoch Gutfreund (1989-1990)
- David Dean Shulman (1992–1998)
- Alexander Levitzki (1998–2001)
- Benjamin Z. Kedar (2001–2005)
- Eliezer Rabinovici (2005–2012)
- Michal Linial (2012–2018)
- Yitzhak Hen (2018–present)

== Advanced schools ==
The Institute annually hosts five schools under the auspices of the Victor Rothschild Memorial Symposia. Each lasts seven to twelve days, and is headed by an internationally preeminent scholar, working alongside an Israeli co-director. Attendees include senior scholars, doctoral students, and postdoctoral researchers. The Institute subsidizes participants in the form of travel grants, tuition or hotel expenses. The Israeli coordinator allocates scholarships to candidates and assumes responsibility for technical arrangements. Scholars have come to the institute from Western and Eastern Europe, South and North America, East Asia, and North Africa.

The IIAS also hosts conferences and lecture series, sometimes associated with schools, such as the Ada Lovelace Bicentenary Lectures on Computability during 2015–16.

Current directors of the advanced schools are as follows:

- School in Theoretical physics: David Gross
- School in Economics Theory: Eric Maskin
- Midrasha Mathematicae: Peter Sarnak
- School in Jewish Studies and Comparative Religion: Haym Soloveitchik
- School in Life Sciences: Roger D. Kornberg
