= Language Technologies Institute =

- Type: Private
- Established: 1986
- Founder: Jaime Carbonell
- Director: Mona Diab
- Faculty: 33
- Location: Pittsburgh, Pennsylvania, US
- Campus: Urban
- Website: www.lti.cs.cmu.edu

The Language Technologies Institute (LTI) is a research institute at Carnegie Mellon University in Pittsburgh, Pennsylvania, United States. It focuses on the area of language technologies. The institute is home to 33 faculty with the primary scholarly research of the institute focused on machine translation, speech recognition, speech synthesis, information retrieval, parsing, information extraction, and multimodal machine learning. Until 1996, the institute existed as the Center for Machine Translation, which was established in 1986. Subsequently, from 1996 onwards, it started awarding degrees, and the name was changed to The Language Technologies Institute. The institute was founded by Professor Jaime Carbonell, who served as director until his death in February 2020. He was followed by Jamie Callan, and then Carolyn Rosé, as interim directors. In August 2023, Mona Diab became the director of the institute.

== Academic programs ==
The institute currently offers two Ph.D. programs, four different types of master degrees and an undergraduate minor. The master's programs each offer a different focus or career target. The Master of Language Technologies (MLT) is a research-focused masters in which students take all the same classes as Ph.D. students, and are frequently funded through sponsored research projects. In effect, this means they work on grants with faculty the same as Ph.D. students, so most transition to Ph.D. programs after completion. The MLT serves as a bridging masters for students from non-traditional backgrounds or with limited research experience in language technologies. In contrast, the Master of Science in Intelligent Information Systems (MIIS), Master of Computational Data Science (MCDS), and Master of Science in Artificial Intelligence and Innovation (MSAII) focus more heavily on coursework and projects that prepare students for industry jobs. The MIIS and MCDS programs are also targeted at shorter (e.g. 16 month) completion times and require an industry internship during the program.

== Faculty ==
Notable faculty include Alan W Black (Speech), Louis-Philippe Morency (Multimodal Machine Learning), Scott Fahlman (Knowledge Representation), Justine Cassell (Human-computer interaction), Eric Nyberg (Information Retrieval), Carolyn Rosé (Learning Sciences), Eric Xing, and Alex Waibel (Speech Recognition), Rita Singh (voice forensics).

== Spinoffs and Affiliated Companies ==
=== Safaba Translation Systems ===
Co-founded by LTI faculty member Alon Lavie in 2009, Safaba was acquired in 2015 by Amazon and incorporated into the company's Pittsburgh offices. Once incorporated into Amazon's corporate structure, the Safaba team became known as the Amazon Machine Translation R&D Group, and would go on to contribute to the development of Amazon Alexa.

=== CognistX ===
Co-founded by LTI Professor and MCDS program director Eric Nyberg, The company's projects include work in targeted advertising, oil and gas, and psychedelic drug research.

== See also ==
- Human Computer Interaction Institute at Carnegie Mellon University
- School of Computer Science at Carnegie Mellon University
