= Joint CMU-Pitt Ph.D. Program in Computational Biology =

The Joint CMU-Pitt Ph.D Program in Computational Biology (CPCB) is an interdisciplinary graduate training program in computational biology. It is a joint program between Carnegie Mellon University and the University of Pittsburgh in Pittsburgh, Pennsylvania.

The Department of Computational Biology (DCB) at the University of Pittsburgh and the Computational Biology Department at Carnegie Mellon University together serve as the administrative homes of the CPCB. Dr. Ivet Bahar, the John K. Vries Chair of the Department of Computational Biology at Pitt, and Dr. Robert F. Murphy, Director of the Computational Biology Department at Carnegie Mellon, are the founding directors of the CPCB.

In 2009, the CPCB was selected as one of ten programs nationwide to receive an NIH T32 Training Grant as part of the NIBIB-HHMI Interfaces Program (award T32-EB009403).
