= Michal Linial =

Israeli computational biologist

- מיכל ליניאל
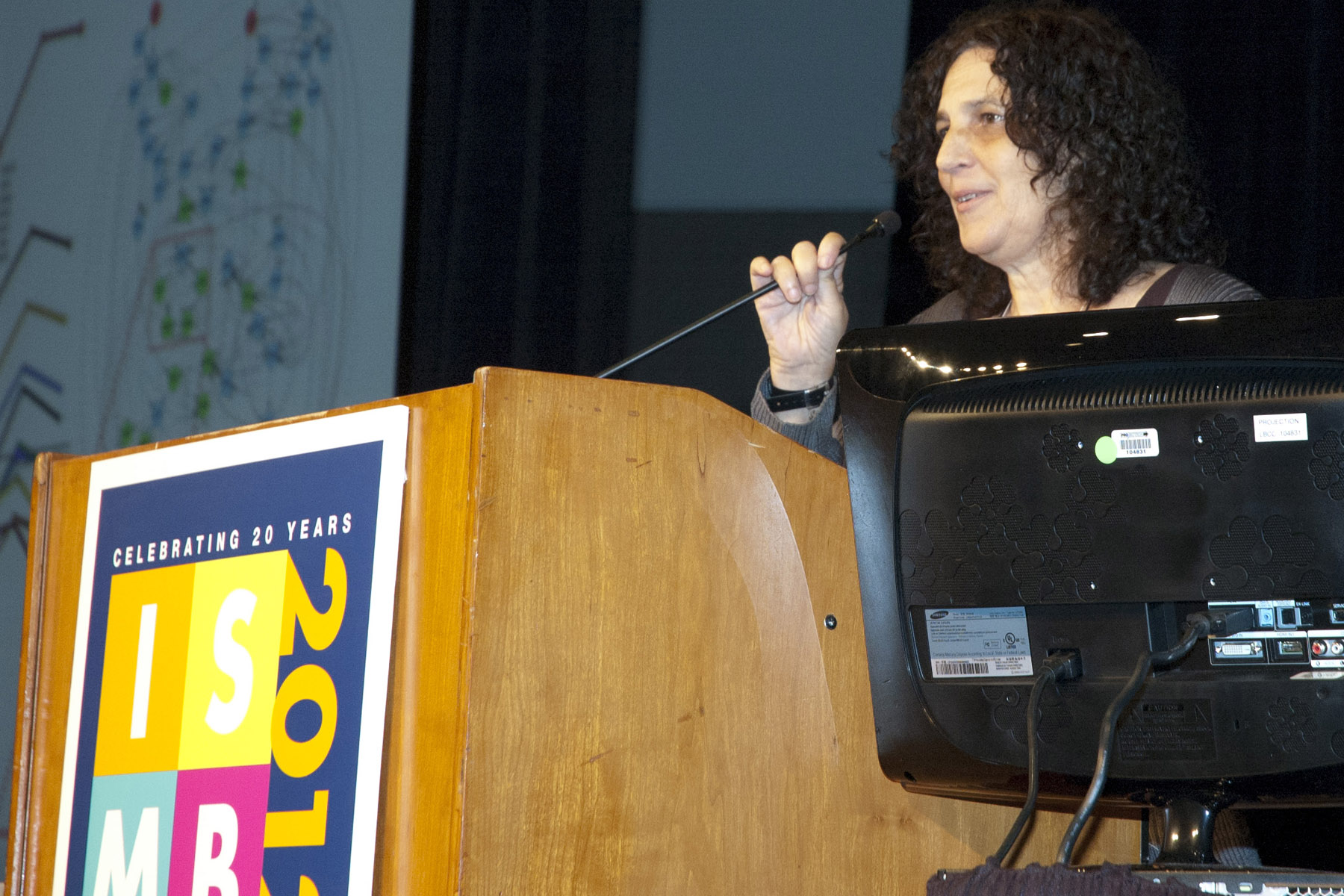
- Michal Linial speaking at the ISMB conference in Long Beach, California, in 2012
- Education: Tel Aviv University (BA, 1979); UCLA (MA, 1981); Hebrew University of Jerusalem (PhD, 1986)
- Awards: ISCB Fellow (2016)
- Scientific career
- Fields: Bioinformatics; Molecular biology; Computational Biology; Neuroscience
- Workplaces: Hebrew University of Jerusalem; Israel Institute for Advanced Studies; Stanford University
- Notable students: Roy Varshavsky
- Website: The Michal Linial Lab

Michal Linial (Hebrew: מיכל ליניאל) is a Professor of Biochemistry and Bioinformatics at the Hebrew University of Jerusalem (HUJI). Linial is the Director of The Sudarsky Center for Computational Biology at HUJI. Since 2015, she is head of the ELIXIR-Israel node (European life-sciences Infrastructure for biological Information).

Linial was elected a fellow of the International Society for Computational Biology (ISCB) in 2016, for outstanding contributions to the fields of computational biology and bioinformatics and served on the Board of Directors (2005–2016), and as a Vice-President (2007–2016), of the ISCB.

She was a Director at the Israel Institute for Advanced Studies (IIAS) from 2012 to 2018. She earned her BA from Tel Aviv University in 1979, her MA from UCLA in 1981, and her PhD in molecular biology from HUJI in 1986. Linial completed her post-doctoral training at Stanford University in cellular neurochemistry. She joined the faculty of HUJI in 1989, and she founded and has chaired since 1999, the educational program for computational biology in HUJI.

Linial came to wider public prominence during the COVID-19 pandemic as her research and forecasts on the virus were carried in mainstream media.

== See also ==
- Ziv Bar-Joseph
- COVID-19 pandemic
- ELIXIR
