= Marine Carpuat =

Computer scientist

- Education: Hong Kong University of Science & Technology (PhD in Computer Science and MPhil in Electrical Engineering); French Grande Ecole Supelec (Diplome d’Ingenieur)
- Known for: Machine Translation; Multilingual Natural Language Processing
- Scientific career
- Fields: Computer Science
- Workplaces: University of Maryland; National Research Council Canada
- Thesis: Word sense disambiguation for statistical machine translation (2008)
- Doctoral advisor: Dekai Wu
- Website: Personal website

Marine Carpuat is a computer scientist who works on machine translation and natural language processing. She is known for her research connecting cross-lingual semantics with machine translation. She has been recognized with a NSF Career Award in 2018, a Google Research award in 2016, and Amazon Faculty Awards in 2016 and 2018.

== Education ==
Marine Carpuat obtained her MPhil and PhD from Hong Kong University of Science and Technology in 2008 under the supervision of Dekai Wu. Her PhD thesis was on the topic of machine translation, and demonstrated the first results showing that explicit modeling of lexical semantics could improve the accuracy of a machine translation system.

== Career ==
After completing her education, Carpuat worked at the National Research Council Canada as a researcher. In 2015, she joined University of Maryland as an assistant professor in Computer Science where she is a member of the CLIP lab. Carpuat works in the area of natural language processing with a focus on machine translation and cross-lingual semantics. She has published over 100 peer-reviewed research papers. Her work is published in the proceedings of computer science conferences, including the Annual Meeting of the Association for Computational Linguistics and Empirical Methods in Natural Language Processing.

== Selected honors and distinctions ==
- 2016 Google Research Award
- 2016, 2018 Amazon Research Awards
- 2018 NSF Career Award
