= Carolyn Rosé =

Computer scientist

Carolyn Penstein Rosé
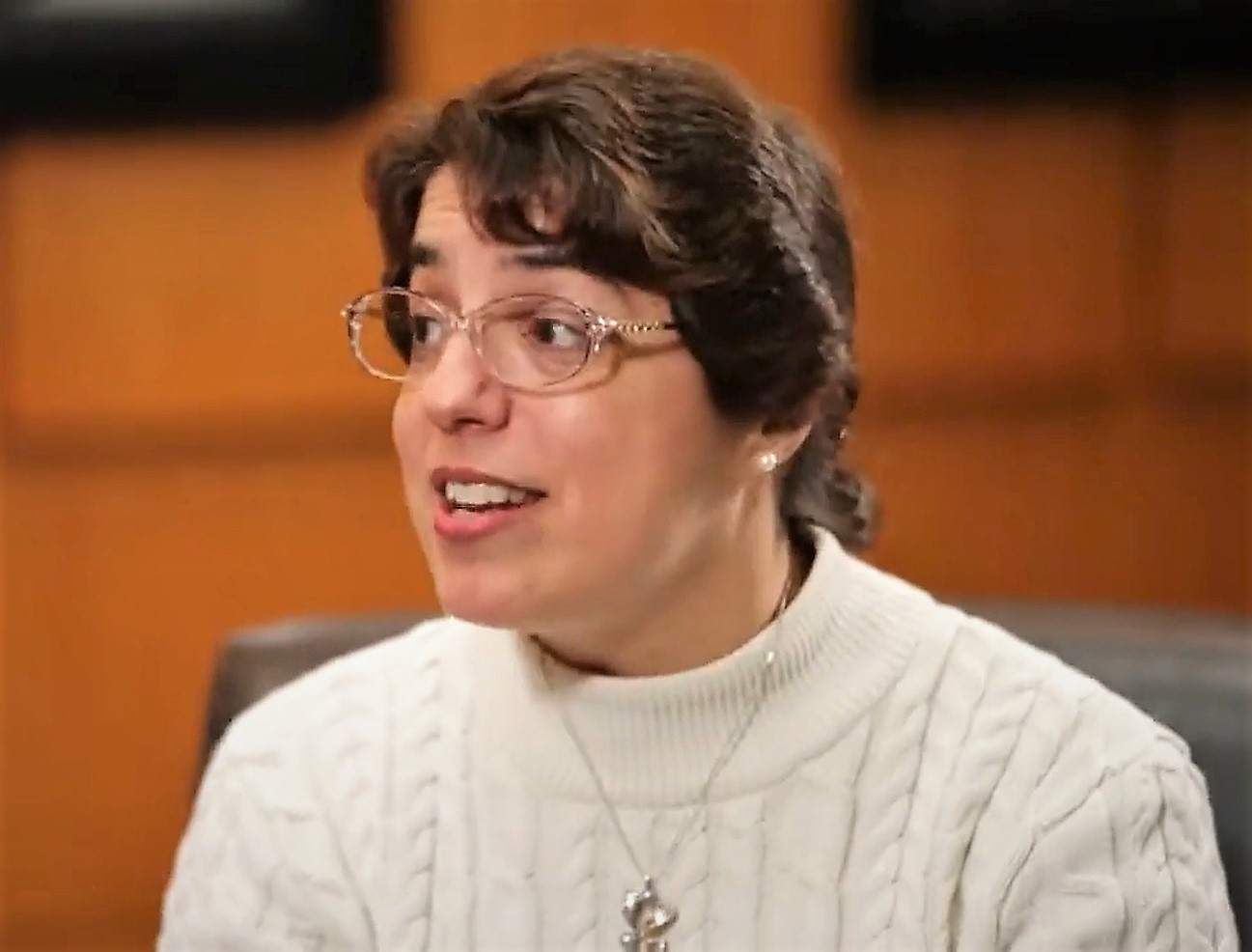
- Rosé in 2013
- Education: Carnegie Mellon University; University of California, Irvine
- Scientific career
- Workplaces: University of Pittsburgh; Carnegie Mellon University
- Thesis: Robust interactive dialogue interpretation (1997)
- Doctoral advisor: Lori Levin

Carolyn Penstein Rosé is an American computer scientist who is a Professor of Language Technologies at Carnegie Mellon University. Her research looks to understand human conversation, and use this understanding to build computer systems that support effective communication in an effort to improve human learning. She has previously served as President of the International Society for the Learning Sciences and a Leshner Fellow of the American Association for the Advancement of Science.

== Early life and education ==
Rosé studied computer science at the University of California, Irvine. She moved to the Carnegie Mellon University for her graduate studies, first completing a master's degree in computational linguistics and then her doctorate in language technologies. Rosé worked under the supervision of Lori Levin. After completing her doctorate, Rosé was appointed to the faculty at the University of Pittsburgh.

== Research and career ==
Rosé returned to Carnegie Mellon University in 2003, where she was awarded tenure in 2014 and made Professor in 2017. Rosé believes that for computer systems to be as useful and efficient as possible, they must be capable of making meaning from conversation. Rosé studies the mechanics of human conversation and uses the findings to computer-supported learning interventions. These programs were shown to improve educational outcomes. At Carnegie Mellon, Rosé directs the Discussion Affordances for Natural Collaborative Exchange (DANCE) programme.

Rosé served as president of the International Society of the Learning Sciences in 2015. In 2020 Rosé was awarded an American Association for the Advancement of Science Leshner Leadership Fellowship. The 2020 fellowships supported public engagement in artificial intelligence.

Rosé was a founding chair of the International Alliance to Advance Learning in a Digital Era (IAALDE).

== Selected publications ==
- Kurt Vanlehn; Arthur C Graesser; G Tanner Jackson; Pamela Jordan; Andrew Olney; Carolyn P Rosé (1 February 2007). "When are tutorial dialogues more effective than reading?". Cognitive Science. 31 (1): 3–62. doi:10.1080/03640210709336984. ISSN 0364-0213. PMID 21635287. Wikidata Q48557166.
- Arthur C. Graesser; Kurt VanLehn; Carolyn P. Rose; Pamela W. Jordan; Derek Harter (15 December 2001). "Intelligent Tutoring Systems with Conversational Dialogue". AI Magazine. 22 (4): 39. doi:10.1609/aimag.v22i4.1591. ISSN 0738-4602. Wikidata Q106171529.
- Jaime Arguello; Brian S. Butler; Lisa Joyce; Robert Kraut; Kimberly S. Ling; Carolyn Rosé; Xiaoqing Wang (2006), Talk to me: foundations for successful individual-group interactions in online communities, Association for Computing Machinery, doi:10.1145/1124772.1124916, Wikidata Q61782983
