= Morenci =

Morenci is the name of some communities in the United States

- Morenci, Arizona
- Morenci, Michigan
- North Morenci, Michigan

== See also ==
- Morenci Mine, the largest copper mining operation in North America
