= Morency, Haiti =

Morency
- Village
- Location in Haiti
- Coordinates: 18.2379862°N 73.6973793°W
- Country: Haiti
- Department: Sud
- Arrondissement: Les Cayes
- Elevation: 18 m (59 ft)

Morency is a village in the Les Cayes commune of the Les Cayes Arrondissement, in the Sud department of Haiti.
