= Robert F. Murphy (computational biologist) =

American computational biologist

Bob Murphy
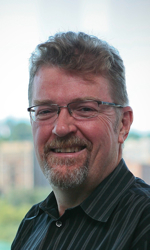
- Education: Columbia University (BA); California Institute of Technology (PhD)
- Scientific career
- Fields: Computational biology; Machine learning
- Institutions: Carnegie Mellon University; Albert Ludwig University of Freiburg
- Doctoral advisor: James F. Bonner
- Website: www.andrew.cmu.edu/user/murphy/

Robert F. Murphy is an American computational biologist. He is the Ray and Stephanie Lane Professor of Computational Biology Emeritus at Carnegie Mellon University, where he is the director of the M.S. Program in Automated Science. He was previously a professor of biological sciences, biomedical engineering, and machine learning. He co-founded the Center for Bioimage Informatics at Carnegie Mellon with Jelena Kovacevic and founded the Joint CMU-Pitt Ph.D. Program in Computational Biology. He also founded the Computational Biology Department at Carnegie Mellon University (originally the Lane Center for Computational Biology) and served as its head from 2009 to 2020.

== Biography ==
Prior to arriving at Carnegie Mellon, Murphy was a Damon Runyon Cancer Research Foundation postdoctoral fellow with Charles R. Cantor at Columbia University from 1979 through 1983. Murphy earned a B.A. in biochemistry from Columbia College in 1974 and a Ph.D. in biochemistry from the California Institute of Technology in 1980. He received a Presidential Young Investigator Award from the National Science Foundation shortly after joining the faculty at Carnegie Mellon in 1983. In 2005, NIH selected him as the first full-term chair of its new Biodata Management and Analysis Study Section. In 2006, he was named a Fellow of the American Institute for Medical and Biological Engineering. In 2019, he was elected as a Fellow of the IEEE for his contributions to machine learning algorithms for biological images. Murphy has received research grants from the National Institutes of Health, the National Science Foundation, the American Cancer Society, the American Heart Association, the Arthritis Foundation, and the Rockefeller Brothers Fund. He has co-edited two books and two special journal issues on "Cell and Molecular Imaging," and published over 200 research papers. He served as President of the International Society for the Advancement of Cytometry, was named as the first External Senior Fellow of the School of Life Sciences in the Freiburg (Germany) Institute for Advanced Studies, and has been named as an Honorary Professor at the University of Freiburg. He was a member of the National Advisory General Medical Sciences Council and the National Institutes of Health Council of Councils.

Murphy's career has centered on combining fluorescence-based cell measurement methods with quantitative and computational methods. He and his collaborators did extensive work on the application of flow cytometry to analyze endocytic membrane traffic beginning in the early 1980s and pioneered the application of machine learning methods to high-resolution fluorescence microscope images depicting subcellular location patterns in the mid-1990s. This work led to the development of the first systems for automatically recognizing all major organelle patterns in 2D and 3D images.

Murphy's leadership experience includes developing the first formal undergraduate program in computational biology in 1987 and founding the Merck Computational Biology and Chemistry program at Carnegie Mellon in 1999. These programs were important forerunners to the 2005 establishment of a Ph.D. program in computational biology in partnership with the University of Pittsburgh. Murphy cofounded Quantitative Medicine, LLC based upon work from his research group. The company was sold to Predictive Oncology, Inc. in 2020.
