= Kenneth C. Griffin School of Computer Science =

School for computer science in the United States

Coordinates: 40.44371°N 79.94443°W

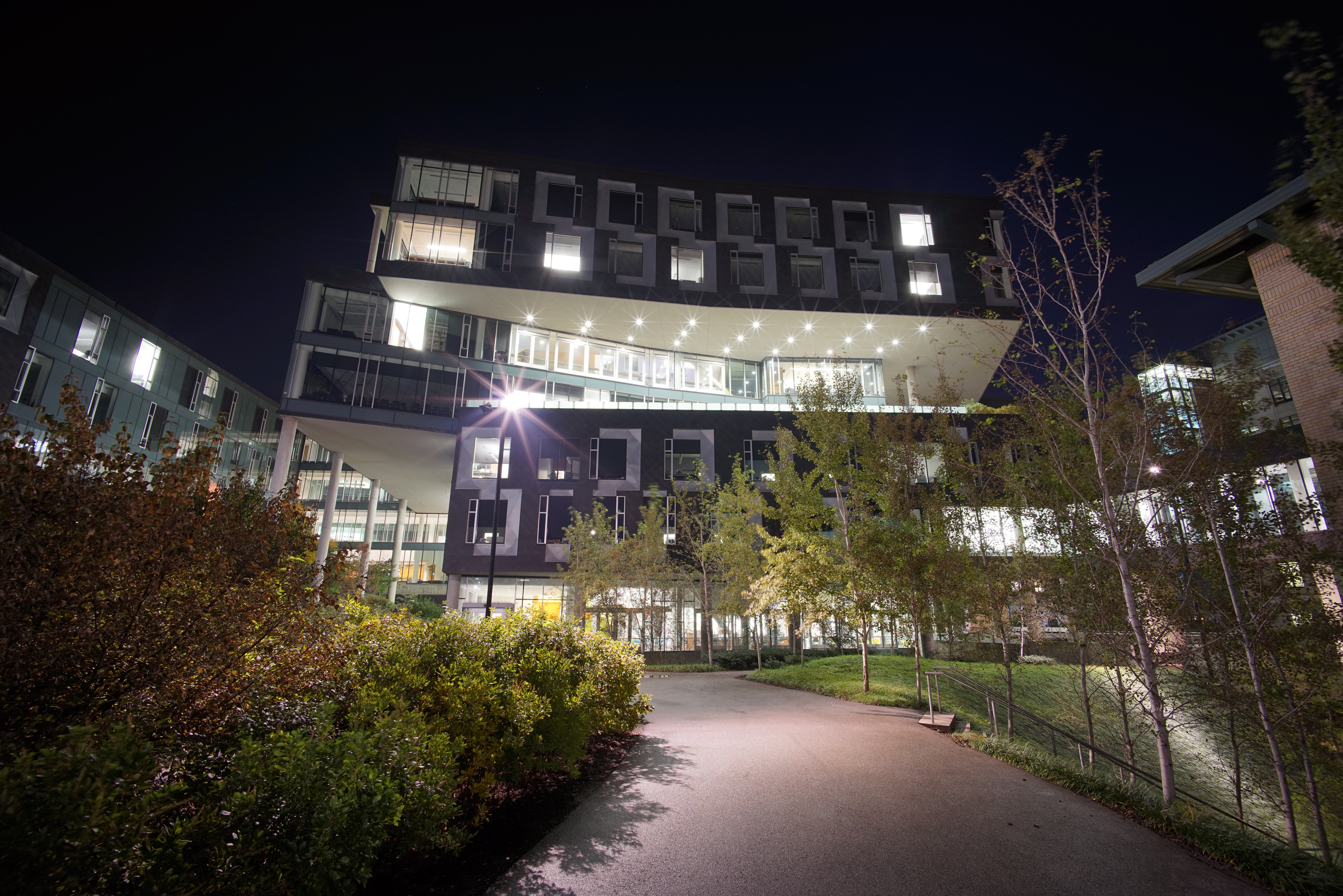
SCS at Carnegie Mellon

The Kenneth C. Griffin School of Computer Science (SCS), formerly known as the School of Computer Science from 1988 until September 2026, is a constituent school of Carnegie Mellon University in Pittsburgh, Pennsylvania. It was established in 1988.

The Gates-Hillman Complex, home to Carnegie Mellon University's School of Computer Science

== History ==
=== As a department ===
In July 1965, Allen Newell, Herbert A. Simon, and Alan J. Perlis, in conjunction with the faculty from the Graduate School of Industrial Administration (GSIA, renamed Tepper School of Business in 2004), staff from the newly formed Computation Center, and key administrators created the Computer Science Department, one of the first such departments in the nation. Their mission statement was "to cultivate a course of study leading to the PhD degree in computer science, a program that would exploit the new technology and assist in establishing a discipline of computer science." The educational program, formally accepted in October 1965, drew its first graduate students from several existing academic disciplines: mathematics, electrical engineering, psychology, and the interdisciplinary Systems and Communications Sciences program in the Graduate School of Industrial Administration. The department was housed within the Mellon College of Science.

During the 1970s the Computer Science Department offered only a PhD study program, with no master's degree as an intermediate step. The PhD program required a minimum of six years of residency. It was called the "do or die" program among the graduate students, because a student could not drop a PhD and receive a master's degree. It had quickly focused on computer networking, operating systems (Hydra, Accent, Mach), and robotics.

=== As a school ===
With support from Newell, Simon, Nico Haberman, Provost Angel Jordan and President Richard Cyert, the computer science department began a two-year status as a "floating" department in the early months of 1986. Then, the Department began to grow, both academically and financially. In 1988, the School of Computer Science was established, among the first such schools in the country. The Computer Science Department was the original department within the school.

On September 30, 2026, the School of Computer Science was renamed the Kenneth C. Griffin School of Computer Science following a $3 billion donation to CMU from Kenneth C. Griffin, including $500 million designated for the school.

== Organization ==
- Ray and Stephanie Lane Computational Biology Department (CBD)
- Computer Science Department (CSD)
- Human–Computer Interaction Institute (HCII)
- Software and Societal Systems Department (S3D)
- Language Technologies Institute (LTI)
- Machine Learning Department (MLD)
- Robotics Institute (RI)

== Culture ==
=== Traditions ===
- Carnegie Mellon's Mobot Races, now in their 14th year, are hosted by the School of Computer Science during every Spring Carnival celebration. The Mobots (short for mobile robots) follow a slalom course painted in the sidewalk outside of Wean Hall. The Mobot Races used to include a MoboJoust competition, but it has not been held since 2002 to avoid damaging the Mobots.
- SCS Day is a yearly celebration of computer science that started in 2003. The event features a variety of activities, including exhibits, workshops and games, in addition to an evening talent show.

=== Smiley face ===
SCS research professor Scott Fahlman is credited with the invention of the smiley face emoticon. He suggested the emoticon on an electronic board in 1982 as a way for board readers to know when an author was joking. The text of Fahlman's original post was lost for nearly 20 years but was later recovered from backup tapes:

19-Sep-82 11:44    Scott E  Fahlman             :-)
From: Scott E  Fahlman <Fahlman at Cmu-20c>
I propose that the following character sequence for joke markers:
:-)
Read it sideways.  Actually, it is probably more economical to mark
things that are NOT jokes - given current trends.  For this, use
:-(

=== Tartan Racing ===
Tartan Racing is a collaboration between Carnegie Mellon and General Motors Corporation that competes in the DARPA Grand Challenge. The Grand Challenge is a competition for driverless cars sponsored by Defense Advanced Research Projects Agency (DARPA). Tartan Racing is led by Carnegie Mellon roboticist William L. "Red" Whittaker.

In 2007, Tartan Racing won the DARPA Urban Challenge, in which 11 autonomous ground vehicles raced over urban roadways. In the challenge, team vehicles were required to obey all California driving laws, share the road with other drivers and robotic cars, and complete the course in under six hours. Tartan Racing won the $2 million cash prize with Boss, a reworked 2007 Chevy Tahoe. Averaging about 14 miles (23 km) an hour for a 55-mile (89 km) trip, Boss beat the second-place team, Stanford Racing, by just under 20 minutes.

=== SCS honors and awards ===
The School established a number of honors and awards.

- SCS Endowed Chairs
- Finmeccanica Chair
- A. Nico Habermann Chair in the School of Computer Science
- Litton Faculty Fellows
- Allen Newell Award for Research Excellence
- Herbert A. Simon Award for Teaching Excellence in Computer Science
- The Robert Doherty Prize for Excellence in Education
- Carnegie Mellon University Undergraduate Academic Advising Award

=== Gates and Hillman Centers ===
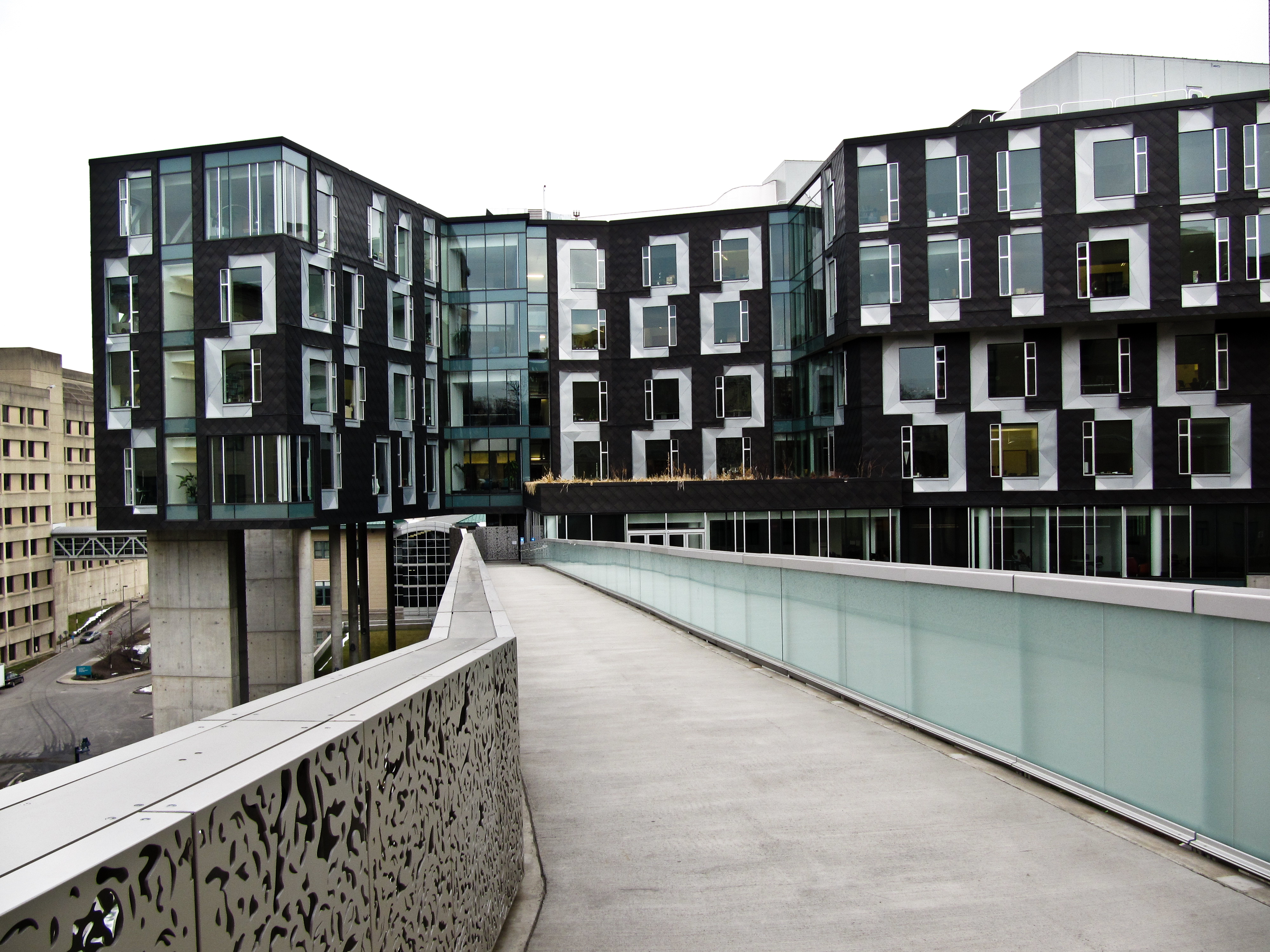
Gates and Hillman Centers

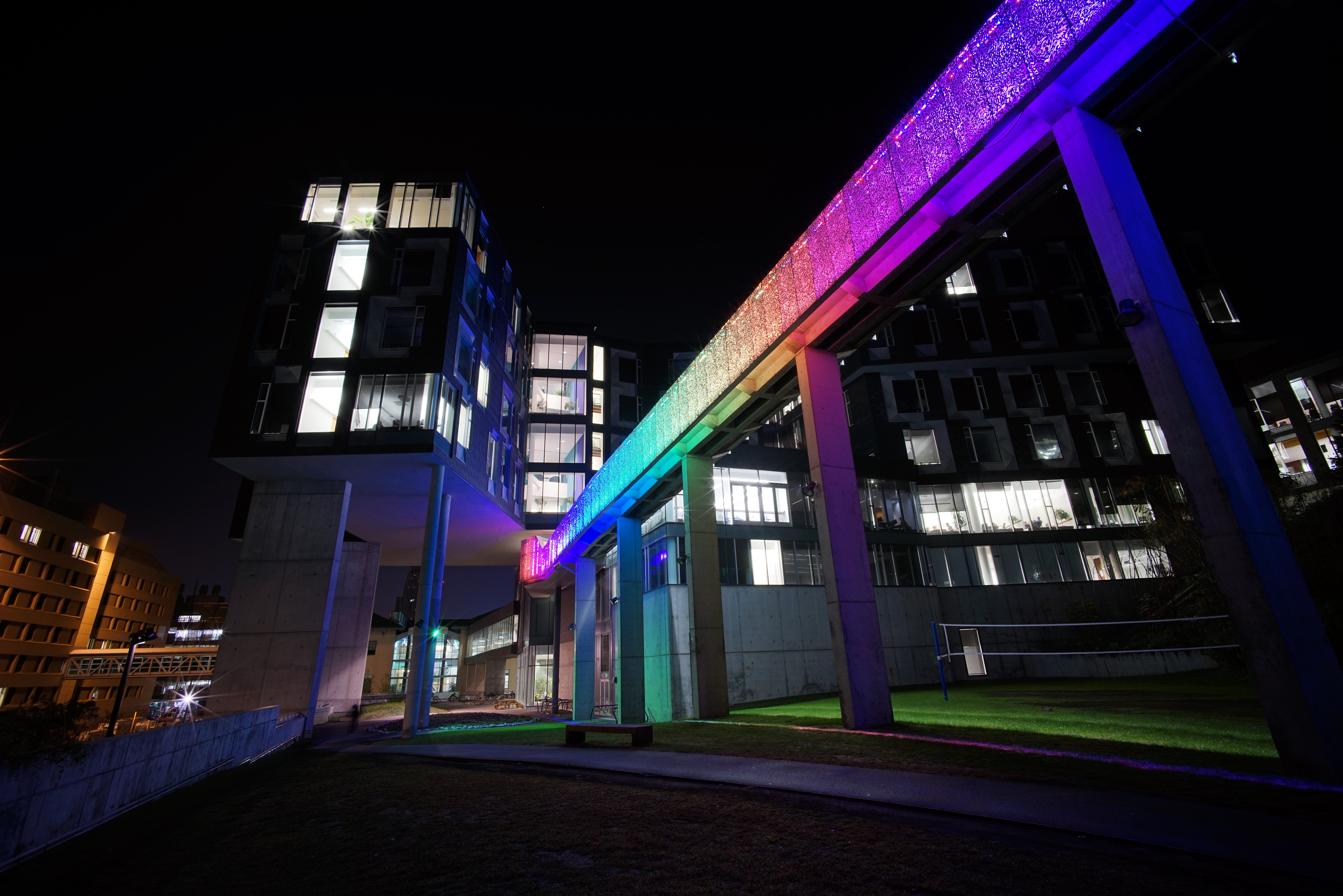
The Randy Pausch memorial bridge has LEDs that glow different colours at night.

The Gates Center for Computer Science and the Hillman Center for Future-Generation Technologies are home to much of the School of Computer Science. The $98 million complex was opened in 2009. It has 217,000-square-foot (20,200 m^{2}) of floor space, including about 310 offices, 11 conference rooms, 32 labs, 8,000 square feet (740 m^{2}) of project space and the Planetary Robotics Center. It also houses 12 classrooms, including a 250-seat auditorium.

Additionally, the Gates Center connects to the Purnell Center, which houses the School of Drama, via the Randy Pausch Memorial Footbridge. The bridge represents Professor Pausch's own devotion to linking computer science and entertainment, as he was a co-founder of Carnegie Mellon's Entertainment Technology Center.

Mack Scogin Merril Elam Architects of Atlanta, Georgia were the lead architects. The Gates and Hillman Centers have received LEED Gold Certification.

== Faculty ==
Faculty members from the School of Computer Science have received international recognition for achievements within their fields. These honors include memberships and fellowships in the National Academy of Sciences, the National Academy of Engineering, the American Association for the Advancement of Science, the Association for Computing Machinery, the Institute for Electrical and Electronic Engineers, the Alfred P. Sloan Foundation, the MacArthur Fellowship Program, and the Guggenheim Fellowship Program. Notably, thirteen SCS faculty and alumni have won the A. M. Turing Award, the Association for Computing Machinery's most prestigious award, often called the "Nobel Prize of computing." These include Raj Reddy, Manuel Blum and Edmund M. Clarke of the recent active faculty, in addition to Emeritus Faculty Dana Scott and former faculty Geoffrey Hinton.

=== List of notable faculty members ===
- Randy Pausch was a professor of computer science, human-computer interaction and design. Pausch was also a best-selling author, who became known around the world after he gave "The Last Lecture" speech on September 18, 2007 at Carnegie Mellon. Pausch was instrumental in the development of Alice, a computer teaching tool. He also co-founded Carnegie Mellon's Entertainment Technology Center. Randy Pausch died on July 25, 2008.
- Mary Shaw is the Alan J. Perlis Professor of Computer Science in the Institute for Software Research at Carnegie Mellon University. Shaw published seminal work on software engineering, and has lately become well known for her work on computer science education. Shaw was awarded the National Medal of Technology and Innovation on November 21, 2014.
- Luis von Ahn is a Consulting Professor in the Computer Science Department, where he also received his PhD in 2005. Von Ahn was named a MacArthur Fellow in 2006 (called the "genius" grant). He also created Games With a Purpose, a website where users can play games to help train computers to solve complicated problems, in addition to reCAPTCHA and Duolingo.
- William L. "Red" Whittaker is a roboticist and research professor of robotics at Carnegie Mellon who led the Tartan Racing team to victory in the 2007 DARPA Grand Challenge. He is also leading a team of Carnegie Mellon students to win the Google Lunar X Prize. Whittaker is the Fredkin Professor of Robotics at the Robotics Institute and the director of the Robotics Institute's Field Robotics Center since its creation in 1983. Whittaker earned his master's and doctoral degrees in Civil Engineering from Carnegie Mellon in the late 1970s.
- Raj Reddy is the University Professor of Computer Science and Robotics and Moza Bint Nasser Chair at the School of Computer Science at Carnegie Mellon University. His areas of interest include artificial intelligence and human-computer interaction. He received the ACM Turning award in 1994. He received the French Legion of Honour in 1984 and Padma Bhushan award in 2001. He was also awarded the Honda Prize in 2005, and the Vannevar Bush Award in 2006. Reddy was the founding director of the Robotics Institute and the Dean of School of Computer Science. He was one of the founders of the American Association for Artificial Intelligence and was its President from 1987 to 1989.
- Takeo Kanade is a U.A. and Helen Whitaker University Professor of Computer Science and Robotics. He is the director of the Quality of Life Technology Engineering Research Center at Carnegie Mellon. His main areas of interest include computer vision, multi-media, manipulators, autonomous mobile robots, and sensors.
- Hans Moravec is a research professor at the Robotics Institute with interests in mobile robots and artificial intelligence. He worked in the RI's Mobile Robot Lab, a research space designed to produce robots able to move through intricate indoor and outdoor areas. He also helped develop Moravec's paradox in the 1980s, which states that it is more difficult for computers to learn basic human instincts than human reason.
- Manuela M. Veloso is the Herbert A. Simon Professor at the School of Computer Science, Carnegie Mellon University. She is the President of the International RoboCup Federation that she co-founded.
- Manuel Blum is the Bruce Nelson Professor of Computer Science and a Turing Award winner. His wife Lenore Blum and son Avrim Blum are also professors in the School of Computer Science.
- Lorrie Cranor is the FORE Systems Professor in the Institute for Software Research and served as the Chief Technologist at the Federal Trade Commission.
- Alexander Waibel has introduced cross-lingual communication systems, such as consecutive and simultaneous interpreting systems on a variety of platforms. In fundamental research on machine learning, he is known for the Time Delay Neural Network, the first Convolutional Neural Network trained by gradient descent, using backpropagation.
- Kathleen Carley is a computational social scientist and a professor at the Software and Societal Systems Department.
- David Garlan is a professor at the Software and Societal Systems Department.
- Randal Bryant is a Founders University Professor of Computer Science Emeritus and former Dean of the School of Computer Science.
- Daniel Siewiorek is the Buhl University Professor Emeritus at CMU.
- Michael Ian Shamos is a Distinguished Career Professor in the Software and Societal Systems Department and Language Technologies Institute.

== See also ==
- Ray and Stephanie Lane Computational Biology Department
- Robotics Institute
- Software Engineering Institute
- Language Technologies Institute
- Human-Computer Interaction Institute
- Dave Rule
