= Carnegie Mellon School of Art =

Academic unit of the Carnegie Mellon College of Fine Arts

Coordinates: 40.44156°N 79.94292°W

The College of Fine Arts Building

The Carnegie Mellon School of Art is a department-level school within the College of Fine Arts at Carnegie Mellon University, a private university in Pittsburgh, Pennsylvania.

The School of Art was preceded by the School of Applied Design, founded in 1906. In 1967, the School of Art (then known as the Department of Painting & Sculpture) separated from the School of Design and became devoted to visual fine arts.

The School of Art grants a four-year Bachelor of Fine Arts degree and a three-year interdisciplinary Master of Fine Arts degree. It has more than 200 undergraduate students and 18 graduate students. U.S. News & World Report's most recent (2026) survey of academics at art and design programs ranks Carnegie Mellon University as the second Best Masters of Fine Arts program in the United States.

== History ==
In 1906 Andrew Carnegie added the School of Applied Design to the recently founded Carnegie Technical Schools. In 1911 the School of Applied Design became the Department of Painting and Design, and over the next 40 years it absorbed programs in sculpture and design from throughout Carnegie Mellon, and went through multiple renamings. In 1967, Carnegie Tech merged with the Mellon Institute of Industrial Research to become Carnegie Mellon University. That same year a separate Department of Design was formed and the modern incarnation of the School of Art emerged, with an emphasis on visual fine arts.

== Academic programs ==
The undergraduate program offers a Bachelor of Fine Arts with concentrations in four major fields: drawing, painting, printmaking, and photography; Electronic and Time-Based Media; sculpture, installation and site-specific work; and contextual practices. All undergraduate students take two years of foundation studio in various 2D, 3D, and time-based media, alongside art history and theory courses. A unique feature of the program is the inclusion of Concept Studio courses, alongside foundation studios, that emphasize non-medium specific approaches to artmaking. Advanced upper-level coursework is completed in one of the four aforementioned concentrations. Students must complete either a self-generated year-long project or series of projects in their senior year to fulfill their Senior Thesis.

The School of Art offers three interdisciplinary bachelor's degrees: a Bachelor of Arts and Humanities (BHA), a Bachelor of Science and Arts (BSA), and a Bachelor of Computer Science and Arts (BCSA). These degrees require fulfillment of full coursework from two selected majors, one in the School of Art, and one in the other respective college, as well as BXA General Education and course requirements in the forms of seminars.

The Master of Fine Arts program is a three-year interdisciplinary studio-focused program, with an emphasis on "contextual" art practices that manifest themselves in non-traditional ways, from institutional critique to public interventions and culture hacking. Graduate students work closely with faculty advisors throughout the three years, but are encouraged to take coursework outside of the School of Art. The MFA program requires a substantial written thesis. The program is small and highly selective, admitting 6 students per year.

U.S. News & World Report's most recent (2026) survey of academics at art and design programs ranks Carnegie Mellon University as the second Best Masters of Fine Arts program in the United States. In 2020, the program was ranked first in time-based & new media art, and seventh overall. In 2016, the program was also ranked first in time-based & new media art, and sixth best fine arts program overall.

The School of Art places a strong emphasis on interdisciplinary work and encourages undergraduate and graduate students to engage with the broader Carnegie Mellon community. The College of Fine Arts houses the Studio for Creative Inquiry, directed by artist and faculty member Golan Levin. The STUDIO provides artist residencies, artist grants, technical resources, and hosts lectures and conferences, bringing students from the School of Art, Human-Computer Interaction, Computational Design, and other programs throughout the University, into conversation.

The Carnegie Mellon School of Art further benefits from the surrounding Pittsburgh art scene, which includes museums like the Carnegie Museum of Art, the Andy Warhol Museum, and the Mattress Factory. Students can also cross-register for classes offered at Pittsburgh Filmmakers, as well as through the University of Pittsburgh's extensive Art History and Creative Writing programs.

== Current and recent full-time faculty ==
- Bob Bingham
- Jon Rubin
- James Duesing
- Kim Beck
- Golan Levin
- Susanne Slavick
- Suzie Silver
- Imin Yeh
- Devan Shimoyama
- Andrew Johnson
- Carol Kumata
- Joseph Mannino
- Ali Momeni
- Paolo Pedercini
- Richard Pell
- Martin Prekop
- Melissa Ragona
- Angela Washko
- Clayton Merrell
- John Carson
- Charlie White, Head of School

== Notable alumni ==
- Norman Daly (evening classes with Roy Hilton (1932–34)
- Virgil Cantini (BFA, 1946)
- Andy Warhol (BFA, 1949)
- Philip Pearlstein (BFA, 1949)
- Don Celender (BFA, 1956)
- Raymond Saunders (BFA 1960)
- Mel Bochner (A, 1962)
- Jonathan Borofsky (BFA, 1964)
- Joyce Kozloff (BFA, 1964)
- Raymond Kaskey (BFA, 1967)
- Deborah Kass (BFA, 1974)
- Elizabeth Carpenter (1976)
- Renee Stout (BFA, 1980)
- John Currin (BFA, 1984)
- Burton Morris (BFA, 1986)
- Ragnhildur Stefánsdóttir (MFA, 1987)
- Mia Brownell (BFA, 1993)
- Ryan McGinness (BFA,1994)
- Peter Coffin (MFA, 2000)
- Shana Moulton (MFA, 2004)
- Jacob Ciocci (MFA, 2005)
- Eileen Maxson (MFA, 2008)
