= Culturescapes =

Swiss arts festival

Culturescapes (or: CULTURESCAPES) is a multidisciplinary Swiss arts festival devoted to inter-cultural exchange. The festival, which takes place in autumn, showcases the cultural landscape of a different region, nation or city. Although based in Basel the festival extends to many other places in Switzerland, such as Aarau, Bern, Chur, Zurich, Geneva or Bellinzona. Founded in the year 2002, the festival mainly focussed on Eastern European countries at the beginning. However, with festival editions devoted to countries like Turkey, Azerbaijan, China or Israel the festival gradually expanded its scope. To mark its tenth anniversary in 2012 Culturescapes focussed on Moscow, for the first time placing the topography of a city at the centre of the festival. The 2013 Balkans festival edition highlighted not only a country but an entire cultural region. 2015 Iceland was presented. At the same time was also announced that in the future the festival will take place in the biennial rhythm. The next two editions took place in 2017 with a focus on Greece and in 2019 with a focus on Poland.

From 2021, CULTURESCAPES is opening a new festival series dedicated to critical zones that extend beyond the boundaries of nation states. In 2021, the focus was on the Amazon region and Sahara was the region of choice for the 2023 edition. In 2025, the African desert and its surroundings will be the focus of the festival for the second time.

CULTURESCAPES is a network festival, cooperating with existing arts venues in Switzerland, such as the Kaserne Basel or the Museum Tinguely. The festival is usually supported by Swiss federal agencies, e.g. DEZA, county authorities as well as state departments of the guest country. The festival is interdisciplinary. Next to performing arts like theatre and dance the festival also presents fine arts, graphic arts, craft, literature, film and new Media. In the programming section entitled „Focus" the history, current affairs and popular culture of the focus region are discussed and analysed. This largely happens in cooperation with Swiss education institutions such as the University of Basel or the University of Zurich. Some of the countries and topics chosen have led to protests and debate. Such topics include the Armenian genocide or the Conflicts in the Middle East. In a public letter, Culturescapes was requested by BDS Switzerland, a group advocating the boycott of Israel, not to host the Culturescapes Israel 2011 festival. The BDS Switzerland also protested at some of the events of the festival.

== Foundation ==
The original idea behind CULTURESCAPES was to draw attention to the transformative processes taking place in the less well-known countries of the former Eastern Bloc, as manifested in the art produced there. Gradually, however, the focus shifted to cultural landscapes with a long tradition of artistic diversity, whose current form bears the stamp of a unique combination of historical, political, social and economic factors. Founder and curator of all the festival editions to date is Dutch and Swiss arts manager Jurriaan Cooiman. Since 2009 CULTURESCAPES functions as a charitable foundation. Before this date, the festival had been run by the group Performing Arts Services Basel (PASS).

== Festivals ==
Festival edition	Guest region	Features
2003	Georgia	i. a. Gija Kantscheli as Composer in Residence
2004	Ukraine	i. a. Topics: Chernobyl; Literature from Chernivtsi, Music from Valentin Silvestrov
2005	Armenia	i. a. First Public conference about the Armenian genocide, Tigran Mansurian as composer in Residence
2006	Estonia	i. a. Estland in Wandel, von Kraahl Theater, Arvo Pärt, Erkki-Sven Tüür, first composition contest
2007	Romania	i. a. Monday theatre with Peca Stefan, Gianna Carbunariu; Stefan Niculescu, Aurel Stroe, Horațiu Rădulescu, Ana Blandiana
2008	Turkey	i. a. Fazıl Say; Mercan Dede,
2009	Azerbaijan	i. a. Frangiz Ali-Sade, Aziza Mustafa Zadeh, Pantomime Theatre Baku, first artists in residence program for young artists
2010	China	i. a. Co-production with Wang Jianwei; Jin Xing, Composition request to Wang Xilin, opera from Hangzhou
2011	Israel	i. a. Batsheva Dance Company; Composition by Chaya Czernowin; Co-Productions Ofira Henig, Yasmeen Godder, Daniel Landau
2012	Moscow	i. a. Dimtri Krymov, Yuri Bashmet, Co-operation with Musma (music masters on air), Composition by Alexander Raskatov, Alexey Sysoev und Pavel Karmanov, Vladimir Sorokin
2013	Balkans	i. a. Miljenko Jergović, Dubioza Kolektiv, Oliver Frljic, EnKnapGroup, Rambo Amadeus, Vlatko Stefanovski, Damir Imamović
2014	Tokyo	Part of 150 years anniversary of diplomatic relationships between Switzerland and Japan
2015	Iceland	i.a. Jón Gnarr, Ragnar Kjartansson, Ragna Róbertsdóttir, Egill Sæbjörnsson, Andri Snær Magnason, Einar Falur Ingólfsson, Erna Ómarsdóttir, Sóley, ADHD, Skúli Sverrisson, Ólöf Arnalds
2017	Greece	i.a. Dimitris Papaioannou, Rosarte Children's Choir, Rimini Protokoll, Vassilis Varvaresos, Mönchen vom Berg Athos (Monks of Mount Athos), Milo Rau
2019	Poland	i.a. Krzysztof Warlikowski, Marta Górnicka, Paweł Pawlikowski, Olga Tokarczuk, Vladyslav Sendecki, Kinga Głyk
2021	Amazonia	i.a. Davi Kopenawa Yanomami, Claudia Andujar, Ernesto Neto, Victor Moriyama, Alessandra Korap Munduruku.
2023	Sahara	i.a. Va-Bene Elikem Fiatsi, Keziah Jones, Qudus Onikeku, Felwine Sarr & Étienne Minoungou, Kader Tarhanine, Lionel Loueke, Temitayo Ogunbiyi, Nadia Beugré, Radouan Mriziga, Bouchra Ouizguen, Ami Yarewolo
2025	Sahara	i.a. N'Goné Fall, Radouan Mriziga, Kamel Daoud

== Literature ==
- Culturescapes Aserbaidschan: Kultur, Geschichte und Politik zwischen Kaukasus und Kaspischem Meer. Christoph Merian Verlag, Basel 2009, ISBN 978-3-85616-488-1.
- Culturescapes China: Chinas Kulturszene ab 2000. Christoph Merian Verlag, Basel 2010, ISBN 978-3-85616-514-7.
- Culturescapes Israel: Kultur im Spannungsfeld des Nahen Ostens. Christoph Merian Verlag, Basel 2011, ISBN 978-3-85616-528-4.
- Culturescapes Moskau: Schauplatz der Inszenierungen. Christoph Merian Verlag, Basel 2012, ISBN 978-3-85616-572-7.
- Culturescapes Balkan: Kosovo 2.0 - Balkart. Christoph Merian Verlag, Basel 2013, ISBN 978-3-85616-626-7.
- Culturescapes Island: Zwischen Sagas und Pop. Christoph Merian Verlag, Basel 2015, ISBN 978-3-85616-676-2.
- Culturescapes Greece/ Griechenland: Archaeology of the Future / Archäologie der Zukunft. Christoph Merian Verlag, Basel 2017, ISBN 978-3-85616-845-2.
- «ON THE EDGE»: Culturescapes Poland. ISBN 978-3-033-07245-9.
- CULTURESCAPES 2021 Amazonia: Amazonia. Anthology as Cosmology. Sternberg Press, Berlin 2021, ISBN 978-3-95679-611-1.
- CULTURESCAPES 2023 Sahara: Sahara: A Thousand Paths Into the Future. Culturescapes, Basel; Sternberg Press, London 2023, ISBN 978-1-915609-20-5.
