= Pavel Karmanov =

Russian composer (1970–2024)

- Павел Карманов
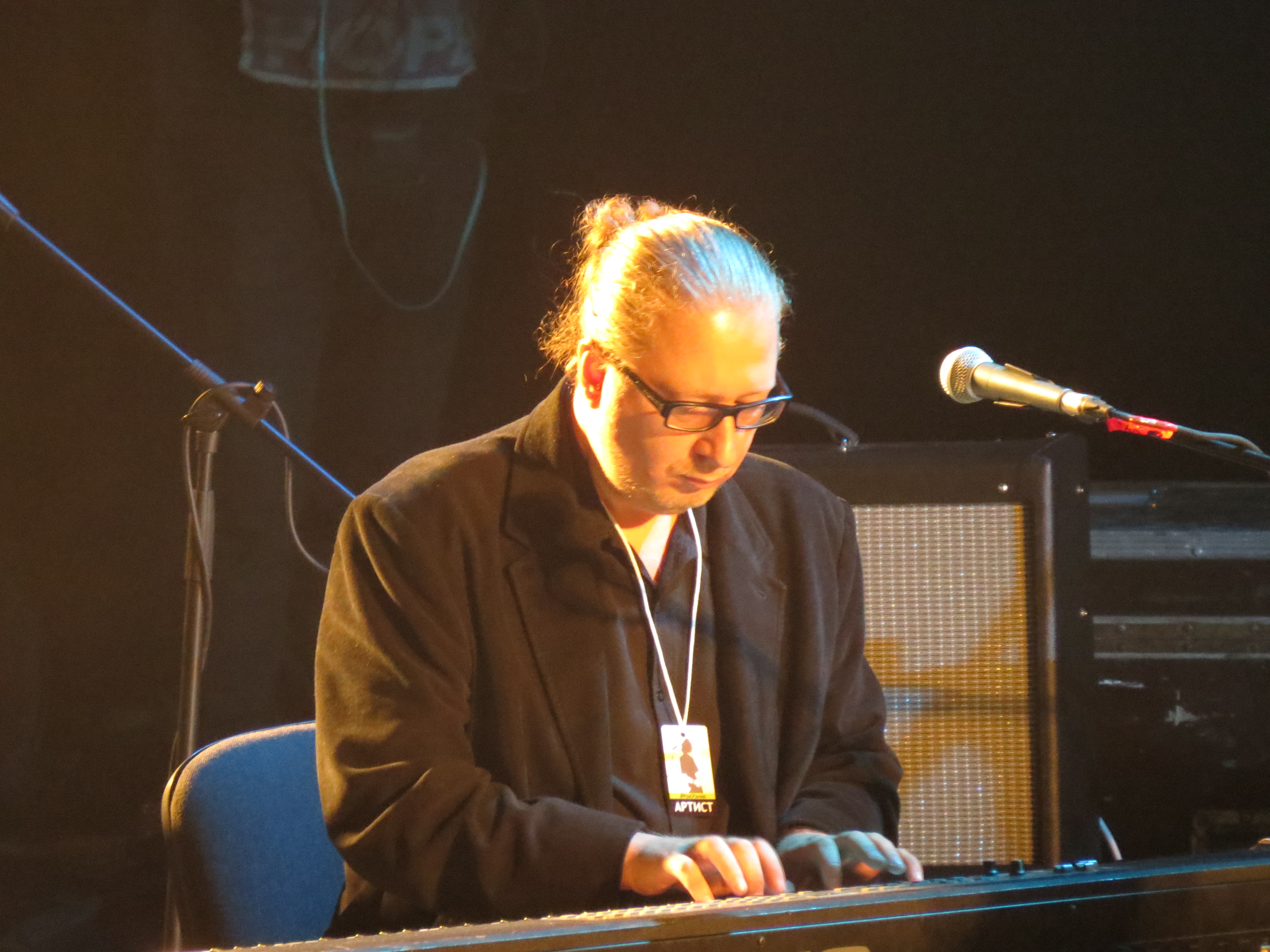
- Karmanov in 2013
- Born: 12 February 1970; Bratsk, Irkutsk Oblast, Russian SFSR, USSR
- Died: 23 November 2024 (aged 54)
- Education: Moscow Conservatory
- Occupation: Composer

Pavel Karmanov (Russian: Пáвел Виќторович Кармáнов; 12 February 1970 – 23 November 2024) was a Russian composer and rock musician.

== Early life and education ==
Karmanov was introduced to music by his mother, a pianist. He composed his first pieces at the age of five in Novosibirsk. In the late 1970s, he moved to Moscow and was accepted into the Central School of Music for gifted young musicians, graduating in 1988. He later studied at the Tchaikovsky Conservatory, graduating in 1995.

== Career ==
In 1996, Karmanov became a member of the Moscow Composers Union. From 2000 to 2017, he was a member of the alternative rock group Vezhlivy Otkaz as a pianist and flautist.

== Death ==
Karmanov died on 23 November 2024, at the age of 54.

== Festivals ==
Karmanov participated in several music festivals, including:

- Moscow Autumn (1991, 1996, 1997, 1998, 2006)
- The Alternative (1990, 1996, 1997, 1998) – Moscow, Russia
- SoundRoute 1999 – Tokyo-Moscow festival, Japan
- Warsaw Autumn – Poland, 2005
- Shostakovich Festival – Seattle, United States, 2006.

== Performances ==
Karmanov's compositions were performed at venues including the Moscow Conservatory and the St. Petersburg Philharmonic. His works were presented at various concerts and festivals internationally. His music has been performed by musicians such as Alexei Lubimov, Yuri Bashmet, Vadym Kholodenko, Tatiana Grindenko and OPUSPOSTH, Mark Pekarsky and his ensemble, as well as pianists Polina Osetinskaya and Mikhail Dubov.

International ensembles and performers who have played Karmanov's works include:

- PADSEnsemble (Italy)
- Seattle Chamber Players ensemble (US)
- The Odeon Quartet (US)
- Beethoven quartet (Basel, Switzerland)

== Awards ==
- 2005 Golden Eagle Award for Best Original Score for Soldatsky dekameron
- 2009 Bessie Award

== Screen works ==
Karmanov had composed music for movies and documentaries. The collection includes

- Bolshoi director Valery Todorovsky
- Arena (Gladiatrix) director Timur Bekmambetov, producer — Roger Corman (US)
- Soldatsky dekameron by Andrei Proshkin
- Gulf Stream Under the Iceberg by Evgeny Pashkevich
- documentaries by Alexei Khanyutin, including "Music for the Fireworks" and "The Road" etc.

Karmanov created soundtracks for television series. Some of them:

- "Only you”, by Nana Dzhordzhadze
- "Multiplying Grieve” by Oleg Fesenko.

He composed music for various cartoons including animated movies by Ivan Maximov.

== Stage work ==
In 2009, in New York, the choreographer Pam Tanowitz won the new dance award “The Bessies”, using Pavel's music for her show titled ”Be in the Gray with me”. Karmanov also received the award for his music.

In June 2013 Bolshoi Theatre staged Alexander Borodin's Prince Igor, which was warmly received by audiences and critics. The new opera is shorter, with director cutting out some parts of the opera. Karmanov and Vladimir Martynov worked on the opera's score to accommodate the new structure. According to Vassily Sinaisky, the Bolshoi chief conductor, such a new structure of the opera was conceived to make it more dynamic and intense.

== Recordings ==
Since 1997, Karmanov's music has been performed on television and radio around the world.

In 2006 Nazar Kozhuhar and his ensemble “The Pocket symphony” recorded and released Karmanov's first CD with chamber music.

In 2014 FANCYMUSIC records released the second disc titled «Get in».

== Digital Releases ==
- Birthday Present For Myself (2021)
- Music For Alexei Lubimov (2020)
- Second Snow On The Stadium (2017)
- Innerlichkeit (2016)
- Get In (2014)
- Re-Music (2013)

== Major works ==
- "Re-Major III" for piano, vibraphone and string quintet (1992)

Premiere Moscow, I-st Festival of memory of violinist Oleg Kagan with Alexander Melnikov (piano) and Yuri Bashmets "Moscow Soloists"
Yakutsk, Russia, "Yakutsk camerata" - https://www.youtube.com/watch?v=EdvvjKYMGNU

- Trio "Birthday present for myself", Viola, Cello and Piano (1993)

Premiere - Festival of "Alternativa». Moscow
Paris, France, at 59 RIVOLI "chez Robert, électrons libres" - https://www.youtube.com/watch?v=ipHncihudyY
Vadim Kholodenko - https://www.youtube.com/watch?v=wVjo3hqDZcU

- "Music for the Firework" for chamber ensemble (1997)

Premiere Moscow, Festival of "Alternativa» with Nazar Kozhukhar & The Pocket symphony - https://www.youtube.com/watch?v=LtwFksDC2KI

- "Different ... rains" for flute, piano and magnetic tape (1996)

Premiere Festival "SoundRoute 1999 Tokio - Moscow" in Japan with Oleg Khudyakov (flute), Alexei Lubimov (piano)
Maria Fedotova (Flute), Polina Osetinskaya (Piano) - https://www.youtube.com/watch?v=5fvqHiPg9QY

- "Seven minutes before Christmas" for flute, piano and magnetic tape (1996)

Maria Fedotova, Yuri Bashmets "Moscow Soloists" - https://www.youtube.com/watch?v=T33iyxocg5I

- "String quaREtet" (1997)

Tallinn, "Eesti musika paevad", Estonia Vlad Pesin (Vn), Marina Katarzhnova ( Vn), Asya Sorshneva (Viola), Petr Kondrashin (Cello) 3/25/2011 - https://www.youtube.com/watch?v=ZdamO9eHBhY

- "ForellenQuintet" ("Trout-quintet") (1998)

Nazar Kozhukhar & The Pocket symphony, film by Andrey Klimenko - https://www.youtube.com/watch?v=1fzNdg06Bf8
Seattle, US - https://www.youtube.com/watch?v=DC9dvsYdhq0

- "Schlaf, mein Herz, schlaf ein" for soloists, 3 choirs and orchestra (2000)

Tatiana Grindenko & The OPUS POSTH, Mark Pekarski percussion project, Sirin ensemble, Moscow Choir by Gennady Dmitryak - http://pavelkarmanov.com/node/205

- "GreenDNA" for String Orchestra (2000) for strings

Big Hall of Moscow conservatory - https://www.youtube.com/watch?v=Hkd-LhBAu-k

- "Den" (folk drama "Death of King Herod") for soloists, choir, rock band and orchestra (2002)

part #5 - https://www.youtube.com/watch?v=T41vl9LOfWc (slideshow)

- 9/11 for chamber orchestra in the memory of tragedy in NYC (2001)

2002 Nazar Kozhukhar & The Pocket symphony - https://www.youtube.com/watch?v=ua5lJnqFgNM

- "The Word" for soloists and mixed choir (2002)

Premiere. Great hall of St. Petersbourg philharmony. Youth Choir of Saint Petersburg Philharmonic's society, Conductor Yulia Khutoretskaya - https://www.youtube.com/watch?v=xQk0lEQHTGQ

- «Second snow at the Stadium» for viola and piano (2003)

Maxim Novikov (Viola), Petr Aidu (Piano), Kevork Mourad (painting) - https://www.youtube.com/watch?v=EJ0LIRUUib8

- «Intermezzo» for piano and orchestra (2004)

Alexey Goribol (Piano) & The One orchestra (Russia) - https://www.youtube.com/watch?v=Uumv7zDIsY4

- «Get in» for 5 performers (2005). SCP commission.

Premiere - Seattle (US) - https://www.youtube.com/watch?v=RBi9V1wl1QM
Warsaw yesen (Warshav autumn), Poland– 2005

- «Cambridge music» for Piano Quartet (2008)

England premiere – London, Cambridge, Oxford - https://www.youtube.com/watch?v=1GfttBghxO0

- «Innerlichkeit» («sincerity, intimacy") for two pianos, flute, harp and string quintet (2009)

space slideshow - https://www.youtube.com/watch?v=4ba8x63NeWM

- Music for video installations by a group of artists AES+F

Feast of Trimalchio (2009) - http://aesf-group.com/projects/the_feast_of_trimalchio/
Allegoria sacra (2011) - http://aesf-group.com/projects/allegoria_sacra/
INVERSO MUNDUS (2015)

- Twice a double concerto (2009) for 2 chamber orchestras in different tunings

Different tuning. Moscow premiere - https://www.youtube.com/watch?v=1JlftPpmK0Y
Same Tuning. European premiere, Riga, Latvia - https://www.youtube.com/watch?v=-OZ0hp8nh50

- Force majeur for 2 violins and 2 pianos (2010)

Moscow premiere - https://www.youtube.com/watch?v=QC0ArnaJzBI (live),
recordings - https://www.youtube.com/watch?v=tyR03efGGEA

- Different brooks - order of Tallinn festival

"Eesti musika paevad" Estonia (2011) - https://www.youtube.com/watch?v=GUWAZx2us3w

- "Day One" for viola, children's choir, organ and percussion (2011)

Premiere at the Dome Cathedral in Riga, Latvia - https://www.youtube.com/watch?v=59xNTBooiqQ

- "Funny Valentine" for viola and harp (2012)

Maxim Novikov, Valentina Borisova. premiere - Riga, Latvia - https://www.youtube.com/watch?v=8ETlJ2UG1Bg

- "The City I Love and Hate", Piano sextet (2012) commissioned by Basel music festival "Culturescapes"

Premiere at "Culturescapes" - https://www.youtube.com/watch?v=kqcDZDwz2O4

- Oratorio "5 Angels" for mixed choir, soloists and chamber choir (2013) Commissioned by international Festival "Academia of Orthodox Music"

Yulia Khutoretskaya & The Young chamber choir & The One Orchestra. Solo Violas - Maxim Novikov, Alexey Bogorad. Conductor Yulia Khutoretskaya. Russia, St.-Petersburg, 07/16/2013 - https://www.youtube.com/watch?v=CvLj0W6v8Kg

- "Past perfect" for Piano solo commissioned by Ksenia Bashmet (2015)

Moscow premiere - https://www.youtube.com/watch?v=9Orn9LplPeQ

- "La musica con Cello" for Cello and Orchestra (2015) commissioned by cellist Boris Andrianov

Great hall of Moscow conservatoire premiere - https://www.youtube.com/watch?v=UqHEyMgcI3U

== With Vezhlivy Otkaz ==
- Geran (2002)
- Gusi-Lebedi (2010)
- Voyennye Kuplety (2017)
- Ne O Tom Rech (2025)
