= Golden Eagle Award for Best Original Score =

Russian film award

- Awarded for: Best Original Score of the Year
- Country: Russia
- Presented by: National Academy of Motion Pictures Arts and Sciences of Russia
- First award: 2002
- Currently held by: Vitaliy Okorokov, Dmitriy Emelyanov for Soviet Union's love (Lyubov Sovetskogo Soyuza, 2024).
- Website: kinoacademy.ru/golden_eagle

The Golden Eagle Award for Best Original Score (Russian: Золотой Орёл за лучшую музыку к фильму) is one of twenty award categories presented annually by the National Academy of Motion Pictures Arts and Sciences of Russia. It is one of the Golden Eagle Awards, which were conceived by Nikita Mikhalkov as a counterweight to the Nika Award established in 1987 by the Russian Academy of Cinema Arts and Sciences.

Each year the members of the academy choose three nominees to award the best film composer and the film as a perception. The first composer to be awarded was Alexey Rybnikov for the film The Star. The most recent award was made to Vitaliy Okorokov, Dmitriy Emelyanov for Soviet Union's love (Lyubov Sovetskogo Soyuza, 2024). Eduard Artemyev and Poteyenko hold the record for the most wins, with five each. Other people with multiple nominations include Alexey Rybnikov (with one win out of three nominations) and Aleksey Aygi (with one win out of four nominations).

== Nomineess and awardees ==
Key

Sign	Meaning
†	The international title is not known
**Bold**	Indicates the winner

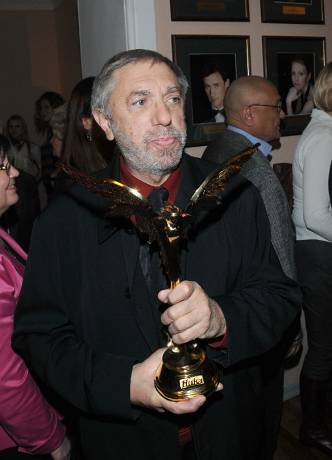
Eduard Artemyev holds the record with the most wins (five, tied with Yuri Poteyenko)

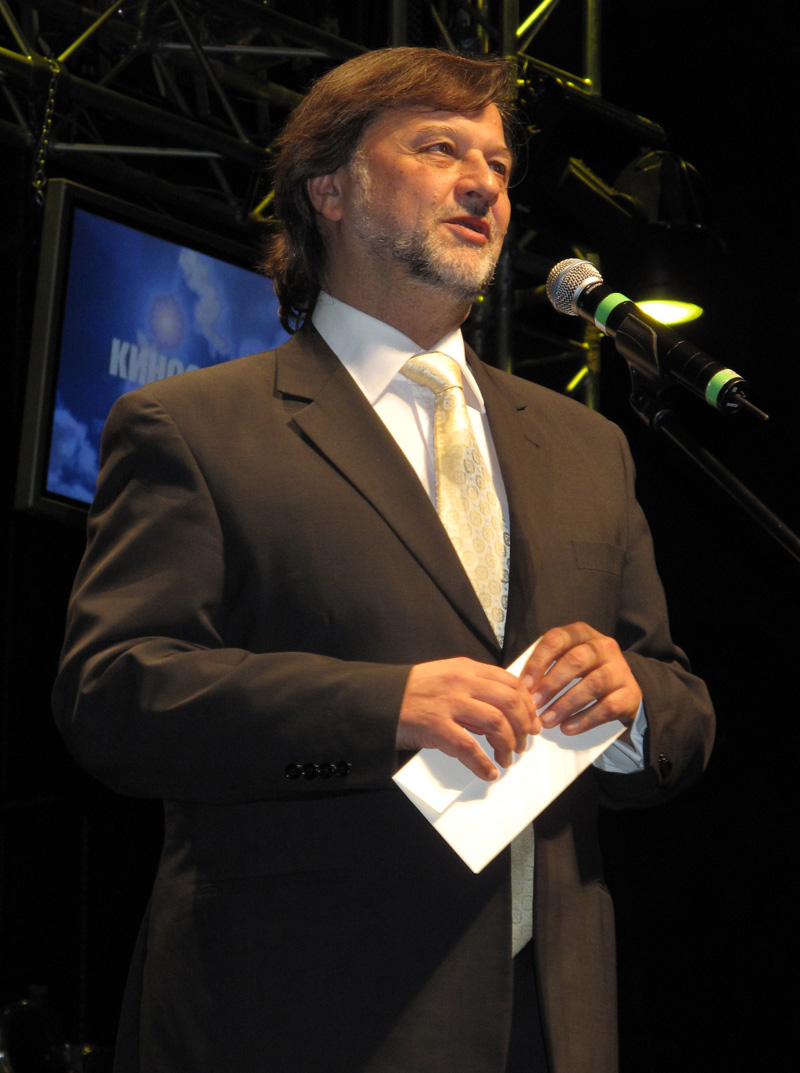
Alexei Rybnikov, threefold nominee and the first winner

Year	Composer	International title	National title	Transliterated title (per BGN/PCGN standard)	Ref(s)
2002	**Alexey Rybnikov**	The Star	Звезда	Zvesda	
2002	Vladimir Dashkevich	(unknown)†	Остановка по требованию	Ostanovka po trebovaniyu	
2002	Isaac Schwartz	(unknown)†	Дикарка	Dikarka	
2003	**Andrey Petrov**	Poor Poor Paul	Бедный, бедный Павел	Bednyy, bednyy Pavel	
2003	Gennady Gladkov	Carmen	Кармен	Karmen	
2003	Alexey Rybnikov	Magnetic Storms	Жизнь одна	Zhizn' odna	
2004	**Ennio Morricone**	72 Metres	72 метра	72 metra	
2004	Aleksey Aygi	My Step-brother Frankenstein	Мой сводный брат Франкенштейн	Moy cvodnyy brat frankensteyn	
2004	Eduard Artemyev	Our Own	Водитель для Веры	Voditel' dlya Very	
2005	**Dato Evgenidze**	The 9th Company	9 рота	9 rota	
2005	Pavel Karmanov	Soldiers Decameron	Солдатский декамерон	Soldatsky dekameron	
2005	Sergey Sidelnikov	First on the Moon	Первые на Луне	Pervye na Lune	
2006	**Eduard Artemyev**	Doctor Zhivago	Доктор Живаго	Doktor Zhivago	
2006	Vladimir Martynov	The Island	Остров	Ostrov	
2006	Kirill Pirogov	Piter FM	Питер FM	Piter FM	
2007	**Eduard Artemyev**	12	12	—	
2007	Eduard Artemyev	1612	1612	—	
2007	Yuri Poteyenko	Attack on Leningrad	Ленинград	Leningrad	
2008	**Aleksey Aygi**	Wild Field	Дикое поле	Dikoe pole	
2008	Ivan Burlyaev	We Are from the Future	Мы из будущего	My iz budushchego	
2008	Ruslan Muratov, Gleb Matveychik	Admiral	Адмиралъ	Admiral	
2009	**Yuri Poteyenko**	The Inhabited Island	Обитаемый остров	Obitaemyy ostrov	
2009	Alexey Rybnikov	The Priest	Поп	Pop	
2009	Alexey Shelygin	Pete on the Way to Heaven	Петя по дороге в Царствие Небесное	Petya po doroge v Tsarstvie Nebesnoe	
2010	**Eugen Doga**	The Rowan Waltz	Рябиновый вальс	Ryabinovy valts	
2010	Andrey Karasev	Silent Souls	Овсянки	Ovsyanki	
2010	Yuri Poteyenko	Black Lightning	Чёрная Молния	Chyornaya Molniya	
2011	**Eduard Artemyev**	Home	Дом	Dom	
2011	Philip Glass	Elena	Елена	Elena	
2011	Alfred Schnittke, Andrei Schnittke	The Master and Margarita	Мастер и Маргарита	Master i Margarita	
2012	**Yuri Poteyenko**, **Konstantin Shevelev**	White Tiger	Белый тигр	Bely tigr	
2012	Aleksey Aygi	The Horde	Орда	Orda	
2012	Yuri Poteyenko	Spy	Шпион	Shpion	
2013	**Eduard Artemyev**	Legend No. 17	Легенда № 17	Legenda № 17	
2013	Aleksey Zubarev	The Geographer Drank His Globe Away	Географ глобус пропил	Geograf globus propil	
2013	Aleksey Aygi	Zerkala	Зеркала	Zerkala	
2014	**Eduard Artemyev**	Sunstroke	Солнечный удар	Solnechnyy udar	
2014	Eduard Artemyev	The Postman's White Nights	Белые ночи почтальона Алексея Тряпицына	Belyye nochi pochtal'ona Alekseya Tryapitsyna	
2014	Artem Vassiliev	Weekend	Weekend	—	
2015	**Yuri Poteyenko**	Battalion	Батальонъ	Batal'on"	
2015	Evgueni Galperine	Battle for Sevastopol	Битва за Севастополь	Bitva za Sevastopol'	
2015	Artem Vassiliev	The Warrior	Воин	Voin	
2016	**Artem Vassiliev**	Flight Crew	Экипаж	Ekipazh	
2016	Igor Vdovin	The Duelist	Дуэлянт	Dujeljant	
2016	Sergey Shustitsky	Paradise	Рай	Ray	
2017	**Yuri Poteyenko**	The Age of Pioneers	Время первых	Vremya pervykh	
2017	Anna Drubich, Pavel Karmanov	Bolshoi	Большой	Bol'shoy	
2017	Evgueni Galperine, Sacha Galperine	Loveless	Нелюбовь	Nelyubov'	
2018	**Anton Belyaev**, **Dmitry Selipanov**	Ice	Лёд	Lod	
2018	Mark Dorbskiy	Unforgiven	Непрощённый	Neproshchonnyy	
2018	Yuri Poteyenko	Frontier	Рубеж	Rubezh	
2019	**Anna Drubich**	Odessa	Одесса	Odessa	
2019	Oleg Belov	Billion	Миллиард	Milliard	
2019	Nikolai Rostov, Ivan Burlaev, Dmitriy Noskov	Text	Текст	Tekst	
2020	**Yuri Poteyenko**	Doctor Lisa	Доктор Лиза	Doktor Liza	
2020	Dmitriy Emelyanov	Union of Salvation	Союз спасения	Soyuz spaseniya	
2020	Savva Rozanov	Streltsov	Стрельцов	Strel'tsov	
