= Guðmundur Steinn Gunnarsson =

Icelandic composer and performer (born 1982)

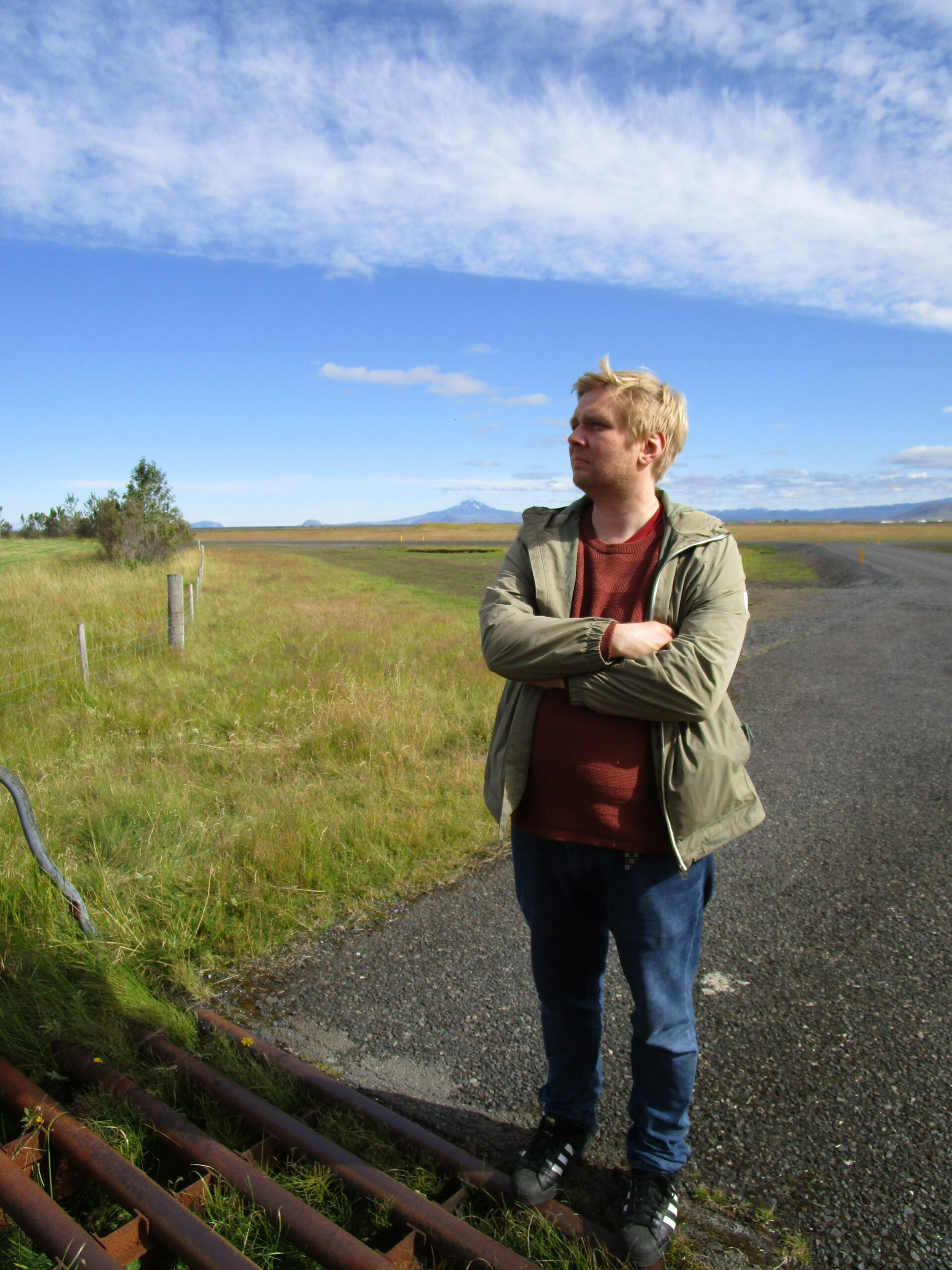
- photo by Katelin Parsons
- Born: 1982 (age 43–44); Reykjavík, Iceland
- Occupation: Composer

Guðmundur Steinn Gunnarsson (born 1982) is an Icelandic composer, performer and a founding member of S.L.Á.T.U.R., an experimental arts organization in Reykjavík. In his compositions he has developed a rhythmic language devoid of regular beat or metre, and he has created a new musical notation to represent his music.

== Biography ==
Guðmundur Steinn was born in Reykjavík, Iceland in 1982. He studied at the Iceland Academy of the Arts, graduating in 2005, and then at Mills College in Oakland, California, where he gained an M.A. degree with a thesis entitled "An Approach to Rhythm". His teachers have included Atli Ingólfsson, Úlfar Haraldsson, Hilmar ór Arson and Hilmar Jensson in Iceland, and Alvin Curran, Fred Frith and John Bischoff at Mills College. He also attended Karlheinz Stockhausen’s courses in Kürten in 2004, went to the Darmstädter Ferienkurse in 2008 and has had masterclasses with Helmut Lachenmann, Tristan Murail, Pauline Oliveros and Clarence Barlow.

He has given lectures at the ONPIP conference in the University of Oxford, at Cornell University, Iceland University of the Arts, Winter Akademie in Schloss Benrath and at the ISSTC in Maynooth, Ireland 2014 where he was a keynote speaker.

== Music ==
Guðmundur Steinn's musical style combines sound patterns without using a rigid rhythmic grid structure or pulse. This approach has led to the development of his animated notation, or 'anitation', instead of using traditional musical scores. During the performance, the musicians follow specific instructions that move across a computer screen. This rhythmic language and animated notation and the structural methods he uses in composition were the subject of his M.A. thesis in Mills College. As Guðmundur Steinn explains, "By intently focusing on small differences, both in rhythm and pitch, the ear gets tuned to a microscopic mode of listening. When things then open up, a new sense of variety is gained."

Works have been performed at events in both Scandinavia and the US, including the Reno Interdisciplinary Arts Festival, Music for People and Thingamajigs, MATA Festival, U.N.M. (Ung Nordisk Musik), Time of Music, Musik21, November Music, Transit, Transart, Dark Music Days and Nordic Music Days (2009 and 2010). Performers of his works have included Quartet San Francisco, BBC SSO, The Zapolski Quartet Ensemble Adapter, PLOrk, Apartment House, Defun, Duo Harpverk, Shayna Dunkelman, Tinna Þorsteinsdóttir, Quartet Opabinia and Atón/Njútón. Guðmundur Steinn also participates in improvisatory performances, and has performed with Steve Hubback, Fred Frith, Andrew D'Angelo, Ad Peijnenburg, Hilmar Jensson and Skúli Sverrisson

Guðmundur Steinn is a founding member of the S.L.Á.T.U.R. ("samtök listrænt ágengra tónsmiða umhverfis Reykjavík" or "The Association of Artistically Obtrusive Composers around Reykjavík"), an experimental composers collective in Iceland, and he is co-curator of the festival Sláturtíð. He also a co-curates the concert series Jaðarber at the Reykjavík Art Museum.

== Awards ==
- 2011 – 80th anniversary National Radio of Iceland Composition Prize
- 2005 – musical director of the film Hidebound (Þröng Sýn) which gained a special prize for music at the NUFF Nordic Youth Film Festival in Norway

== Recordings ==
- 2025 – Clavis Metrica - with Ensemble Adapter, an album released by col-legno
- 2024 – Stífluhringurinn - with Caput Ensemble, an album released by Carrier Records
- 2022 – Landvættirnar fjórar – with ensemble Steinalda, an album released by Carrier Records
- 2020 – Sinfónía – with ensemble Fengjastrútur, an album released by Carrier Records
- 2019 – Vorlag/Sumarlag an album released by Traktorinn Records
- 2019 – Skartamannafelagid an album released by Traktorinn Records
- 2018 – Krákulán – an album released by VF-Industrial
- 2017 – Lárviður – with ensemble Fersteinn, an album released by Traktorinn Records
- 2017 – La Noche Oscura Del Alma – an album released by Tonestrukt Records
- 2016 – Haltrandi rósir – with ensemble Fersteinn, an album released by Traktorinn Records
- 2011 – Horpma – an album released by Carrier Records
- his music has also featured on albums available on the Bad Taste label in Reykjavík and Edgetone in San Francisco

== Works ==
Guðmundur Steinn's works include:

- Hringlaga rigning (2024) for flute, oboe, clarinet, bassoon, trumpet, percussion, piano, 2 violins, viola and cello
- Saddapadda (2024) for solo percussion
- Gleðilegi geðrofsleikurinn (2021–2023) Opera
- Unglingarnir í skóginum (2023) for percussion duo
- Clavis metrica (2022) for flute, clarinet, harp and percussion
- Landvættirnar fjórar (2019–2021) for flute, recorder, keyboard, guitar and 2 percussion
- Hótel Natúra (2018–2020) for flute, oboe, clarinet, percussion, piano, violin, violoncello and electronics
- Stífluhringurinn (2019) for flute, clarinet, recorder, horn, trumpet, trombone, percussion, violin, viola, cello and electronics
- Leyfðu barninu (2017) for bass clarinet, bassoon, violin, violoncello and electronics
- Erfiljóð hand Guðmundi (2015–2016) for oboe, bassoon, 2 harpsichords, 2 percussion, 2 violins, viola, cello and contrabass
- Hafið og örninn - suite for Halldorophone (2014) for solo Halldorophone
- Laur (2012) for flute, bass clarinet, bassoon, horn, trumpet, trombone, percussion, piano, 2 violins, viola, cello and double bass
- Marfjall og hafkar (2011) for flute choir with contrabass flute solo
- Grafgata (2011) for orchestra, traditional notation
- Færibandið (2011) for 4 voices, open instrumentation and 2 voices audience participation
- raBalilabalila (2011) for accordion and piano
- Harskjall og svellkar (2011) for flute choir
- 2 Songs for Accordion (2011) for solo accordion
- Hrammdæla 7 (2011) for 4 recorders
- Nine lullabies for Langspil (2011) for 4 langspil
- Kvartett 7-15 (2011) for somewhat variable quartet
- Hundi (2011) for 8 aluminum cans
- Vargarð (2010) for violin and piano
- Kvartett 6: Koblakist (2010) for somewhat variable quartet
- Kvartett 5: Deikokeitíponsa (2010) for somewhat variable quartet
- Kvartett 4: Halanali (2010) for somewhat variable quartet
- Hakkalamaka (2010) for flute, bass clarinet, cello and piano
- Njarharður (2010) for harp and percussion
- Draumbót (2010) for alto flute, bass clarinet, harp, piano and percussion
- Harsamvaða (2010) for piano
- Kvartett 3: Sigliton (2010) for somewhat variable quartet
- Hrammdæla 1-5 (2009) for variable instrumentation
- Kvartett 2: Kvarandron (2009) for somewhat variable quartet
- Njarður (2009) for harp and percussion
- Harfgreni (2009) for just-intoned single string piano
- Atómas (2009) for 5 langspil
- Kvartett 1: Lardipésa (2009) for somewhat variable quartet
- Ramminjálgur (2009) for flute, harp and percussion
- Loðís (2009) for alto flute and alto recorder
- CalmUs (2009) for 2 French horns
- Handarbaka (2009) for 8 bassoons
- Horpma (2008) for 27 plucked strings
- Harmaaarg (2007) for voice
- Stadlafell (2007) for 5 percussion
- Skula (2007) for 2 percussion
- Golma (2007) for string quartet and live electronics
- Ferkul (2007) for flute and live electronics
- Þrílækja (2007) for 3 percussion, 2 alto saxophones, 1 tenor saxophone, 2 violins and 1 viola
- Shalote (2006) for 2 voices and electronics
- Tvífleskja (2006) for percussion solo
- Selbol (2006) for 3 cellos

All use Guðmundur Steinn's "animated notation" except Grafgata.
