= SubRosa =

American feminist artist collective

subRosa is a cyberfeminist organization led by artists Faith Wilding and Hyla Willis.

In the late 1990s at Carnegie Mellon University, Faith Wilding organized an on-campus reading group that discussed digital culture and technologies, feminisms, postcolonial theory, body- and bio-politics, and reproductive health. It was from this reading group in 1998 that the cyberfeminist collective subRosa formed, with founding members María Fernández, Wilding, Hyla Willis, and Michelle M. Wright. As outlined by members of subRosa, challenging the utopian ideas associated with technology and the internet is the foundation of subRosa’s practice. subRosa’s work is connected to – but differs from – the broader cyberfeminist movement of the 1990s and Donna Haraway’s cyborg theory. Many of subRosa’s works are performance-based and participatory, and encourage members of the public to think deeply about technology and its role in their lives. As the group consisted of artists, activists, and scholars, the collective’s practice reflected the individual backgrounds of its members. Other participants in the reading group at Carnegie Mellon (and at different points, members of subRosa) include Emily de Araujo, Krista Connerly, Steffi Domike, Camilla Griggers, Christina Hung, Carolina Loyola, Laleh Mehran, Elizabeth Monoian, Ann Rosenthal, Suzie Silver, Lucia Sommer, and Rebecca Vaughan.

At The Next Five Minutes 3 Festival in Amsterdam in 1999, subRosa introduced their manifesto, outlining the collective’s histories, purpose, and practices:

subRosa's name honors feminist pioneers in art, activism, labor, science, and politics: Rosa Bonheur, Rosa Luxemburg, Rosie the Riveter, Rosa Parks and Rosalind Franklin.

subRosa is a reproducible cyberfeminist cell of cultural researchers committed to combining art, activism, and politics to explore and critique the effects of the intersections of the new information and biotechnologies on women's bodies, lives, and work.

subRosa produces artworks, activist campaigns and projects, publications, media interventions, and public forums that make visible the effects of the interconnections of technology, gender, and difference; feminism and global capital; new bio and medical technologies and women's health; and the changed conditions of labor and reproduction for women in the integrated circuit.

subRosa practices a situational embodied feminist politics nourished by conviviality, self-determination, and the desire for affirmative alliances and coalitions.

Let a million subRosas bloom!

Hyla Willis writes: "subRosa is a mutable (cyber)feminist art collective combining art, social activism and politics to explore and critique the intersections of information and bio technologies on women’s bodies, lives and work. Since its founding in 1998, subRosa has developed situated, trans-disciplinary, performative, and discursive practices that create open-ended environments where participants engage with objects, texts, digital technologies, and critical learning experiences interacting with each other and the artists."

== Major works and themes ==
Most of subRosa’s works are performances and workshops at university campuses, museums, and gallery spaces. As a part of the performances, supplementary material such as pamphlets, surveys, posters, and website domains were circulated and distributed amongst the crowd. Frequently, subRosa members would wear white lab coats to signal their role as facilitators in science, art, and technology. subRosa’s works provided feminist critiques of biotechnologies and Assisted Reproductive Technologies (ART). In an interview with Ryan Griffis, subRosa explains that through their work, “we have critiqued the appropriation of the feminist notion of "choice" to support commodified development of ARTs (Assisted Reproductive Technologies).” subRosa’s art practice focused on facilitating intersectional and collaborative approaches by inviting scholars from international communities to contribute to ongoing projects.

=== SmartMom ===
This project was created by Wilding and Willis prior to the official formation of subRosa in 1998. SmartMom is a form of appropriation, presented as a promotional website, that critiques the Smart T-shirt, a military technology that surveils soldiers’ bodies for medical purposes. Wilding and Willis created a website to show how the military technology could be used on pregnant bodies for use in research in reproductive technologies.

=== The Sex and Gender Education Show ===
As one of subRosa’s first performances, the members presented a sex-educational class on Assisted Reproductive Technologies to participants. Members of subRosa posed as corporate salespeople and government representatives and organized the participants into cohorts to deliver presentations on reproductive health and technologies using accessible language. The Sex and Gender Education Show was performed in 2000 at the Digital Secrets conference at Arizona State University and in 2002 at the Hardware, Software, and Wetware Conference at St. Mary’s College of Maryland.

=== Expo EmmaGenics ===
Expo EmmaGenics was an installation and performance organized as a tradeshow, where subRosa members presented satirical products from the biotech industry that enhance fertility. subRosa appropriated marketing strategies used in Assisted Reproductive Technologies (ART) that relied on the idea of ‘choice.’ One of the products in the show, the Zygote Monitor, uses technology from baby monitors to surveil the IVF process. Another product, Palm XY facilitates heteronormative pairings of participants for procreation. At the tradeshow performance, subRosa members provided a step-by-step process of ART procedures.

=== Cell Track: Mapping the Appropriation of Life Materials ===
Cell Track: Mapping the Appropriation of Life Materials is an installation and website that depicts a human body. Organs and body parts are labelled and hyperlinked to information that liken stem cell research to colonial practices. Cell Track draws attention to government and legal intervention into medical research. The installation was featured in the exhibition YouGenics at the Betty Rymer Gallery at the School of the Art Institute of Chicago in 2005.

== Responses to subRosa ==
Scholars have addressed subRosa’s works in broader feminist discourses in the 2000s and 2010s. For example, feminist scholar Federica Timeto establishes a connection between subRosa methods of information distribution and collective mobilization to that of second-wave feminisms in the 70s. Technology and design specialists Mary Flanagan and Suyin Looui conceptualize subRosa’s activist art as a modality to visualize and critique data informed by body politics. Further, media specialist Carolyn Guertin argues that subRosa effectively spreads activist messages as they use digital and print forms of distribution.

== Publications ==
subRosa’s earliest works in the late-1990s were pamphlets, which read: “Research! Action! Embodiment! Sociality!” and included their manifesto. Another early publication by subRosa was @SecondOpinion (1999), which were distributed in hospitals and appropriated the idea of getting a second opinion as an activist strategy. subRosa continued to circulate publications and created websites as radical alternatives and channels to provide information to the public.

=== Domain Errors! Cyberfeminist Practices ===
Domain Errors! Cyberfeminist Practices is an anthology edited by the members of subRosa (Wilding, Fernández, and Wright). The anthology uses reproductive health as a case study to weave critical race theory into cyberfeminisms. The contributing authors to the anthology examine racism and technology, histories of cyberfeminisms, second- and third-wave feminisms, reproductive health and technology, online/offline spaces and identity, and activist art.
