= Maria Friberg =

Swedish artist

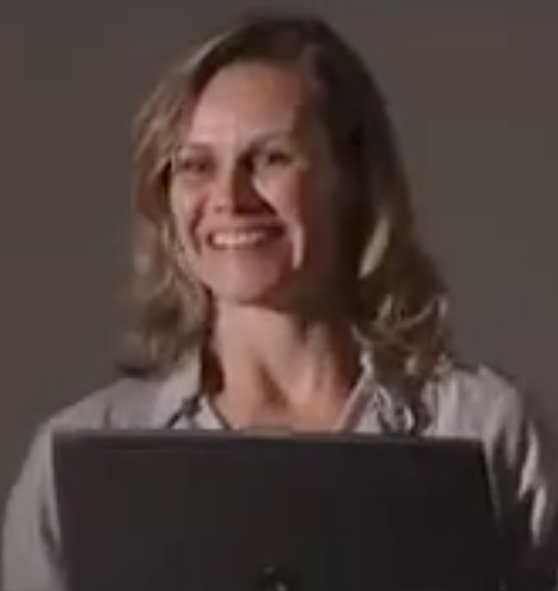
- At the Brooklyn Museum in 2007
- Born: 16 May 1966 (age 60); Malmö, Sweden
- Education: University of Gothenburg; Royal University College of Fine Arts
- Occupation: Artist

Maria Friberg (born 16 May 1966) is a Swedish artist known for her works revolving around themes of power, masculinity and man's relationship to nature. Her images depict ambiguous tableaus with isolated figures in provocative situations.

== Early life and education ==
Friberg was born in Malmö, Sweden, to Monika Friberg and Roland Hylen. She has a sister, Lina Friberg. She was raised mainly by her mother, a hairdresser and potter, with help from her grandparents, in the south of Sweden.

Friberg studied art history at University of Gothenburg in 1986. She then attended Bild & Form, Lunnevad, Sweden in 1987, Nordic Art School, Kokkola, Finland in 1988, Royal University College of Fine Arts, Stockholm from 1989 to 1995; with a break in 1992 to Icelandic College of Art and Crafts (Icelandic: Myndlista og Handidaskoli) (now part of Iceland University of the Arts) in Reykjavik.

== Career ==
Friberg's earliest work was featured in a group exhibition titled Invasion in Millesgården, Stockholm in 1993. For the next several years, Friberg continued to participate in group exhibitions and a few solo exhibitions, mainly in Stockholm. Her first solo exhibition was in 1994, and she received her first public commission in 1996.

The art film Driven (1998) was co-created by Friberg with Monika Larsen Dennis, and features two bodies in a dance of both attraction and repulsion.

After more than a dozen solo exhibitions in the 2000s, Friberg's work has more recently incorporated painting, photography, and videography. Her work has been sold in many countries and exhibited in the U.K., France, and the U.S. She has participated in hundreds of group exhibitions, and continues to hold solo exhibitions, including six in 2014. Friberg has also done three performances, in 1996, 1997, and 2001, and a number of public commissions.

Friberg's work has also illustrated books and other publications.

== Influences ==
Friberg names John Erik Franzen and Ann Edholm as her primary influences.
