= Icelandic College of Art and Crafts =

Icelandic former art school (1939–1999)

The Icelandic College of Arts and Crafts (Icelandic: Myndlista- og handíðaskóli Íslands) was founded in 1939 under the name Handíðaskólinn (The School of Industrial Arts), which was later changed to Myndlista- og handíðaskóli Íslands (MHÍ). When the Iceland University of the Arts (Icelandic: Listaháskóli Íslands, or LHÍ) was established in 1999, MHÍ merged with the institution and became Myndlistar- og Hönnunardeild LHÍ. (Arts and Design Division of LHÍ).

== Notable alumni ==
- Ragna Róbertsdóttir (1970)
- Ragnhildur Stefánsdóttir (1981)
- Maria Friberg (1992)
- Monika Larsen Dennis (1994)
- Egill Sæbjörnsson (1997)
