= Kim Beck =

American artist (born 1970)

- Born: 1970 (age 55–56); U.S.
- Education: Rhode Island School of Design, Brandeis University
- Occupations: Artist, Associate Professor at Carnegie Mellon School of Art
- Notable work: A Field Guide to Weeds, Space Available, A Flock of Signs
- Awards: Sharpe Foundation, MacDowell Colony; Yaddo; Ars Electronica; Heinz Endowments; International Studio & Curatorial Program
- Website: idealcities.com

Kim Beck (born 1970, Colorado) is an American artist living and working in New York City and Pittsburgh, Pennsylvania. Beck works in drawing, sculpture, installation, photography, printmaking and multimedia, focusing her attention on subjects that might otherwise be overlooked. She is especially known for her artist's books and public artworks dealing with the subject of environment and landscape.

Beck's work has been reviewed by media such as Artforum, Art in America, Hyperallergic, KQED, The New York Times, and The Village Voice.

== Artist's books ==
- A Field Guide to Weeds, 2007
- A Flock of Signs, 2014
- Pavements, Potholes & Repairs, 2019

== Public art commissions ==
=== Adjutant, 2015 ===
Adjutant — a mural installed on the concrete wall beneath the 10th Street Bypass ramp for the Fort Duquesne Bridge in Pittsburgh, PA. The mural is composed of images of oversized common weeds using silhouettes in shades of black, gray and white. A team of some 150 volunteers organized by Riverlife Pittsburgh executed the work June 6–14, 2015, during the Dollar Bank Three Rivers Arts Festival. The mural is part of #TBD, a concept for public art projects to bring dramatic changes and attention to the downtown Allegheny riverfront underneath the Fort Duquesne Bridge. In June 2020, this artwork was updated with a BLM mural and subsequent additions.

=== Wildish, 2014 ===
Wildish was commissioned by the Mural Arts Program of Philadelphia.

=== The Sky Is the Limit/NYC, 2011 ===
The Sky Is the Limit/NYC was a temporary skywriting installation in New York City on October 10, 2011.

=== Space Available, 2011–2012 ===
Space Available, was installed March 4, 2011 – January 2012 on rooftops along Washington Street, between West 13th Street and Gansevoort Street in [New York City]. Intended to be viewed from the High Line, the exhibition was commissioned by Friends of the High Line.

== Selected awards ==
Beck has received awards from the Sharpe Foundation, Bemis Center for Contemporary Art, MacDowell Colony, Yaddo, International Studio & Curatorial Program, Art Omi International Artists Residency, Prix Ars Electronica, Pollock-Krasner Foundation, and the Thomas J. Watson Fellowship.

== Exhibition and public collections ==
Beck has exhibited in solo and group exhibitions in the US and abroad, and her work is displayed in numerous public collections.

== Professional affiliations ==
Beck is an associate professor in the School of Art at Carnegie Mellon University.
