= Hildur Elísa Jónsdóttir =

Icelandic artist, musician, and composer

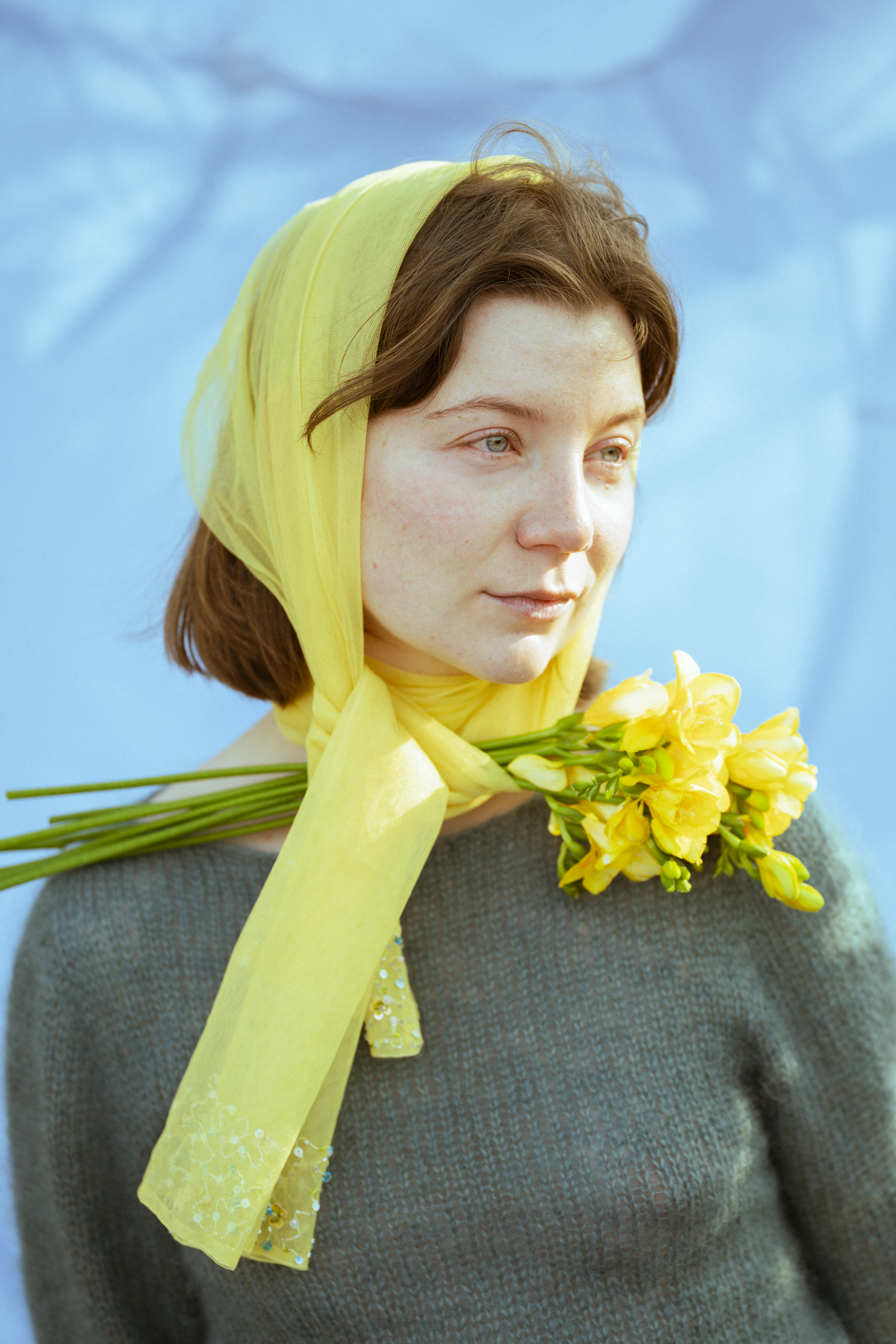
- Hildur Elísa Jónsdóttir in 2025
- Born: August 18, 1993 (age 32); Hafnarfjörður, Iceland
- Occupations: Artist; musician; composer
- Years active: 2010s–present
- Website: hildurelisa.com

Hildur Elísa Jónsdóttir (born 1993) is an Icelandic artist, musician and composer whose practice spans performance, installation, and sound, and explores storytelling and immersive spatial experiences. Based between Amsterdam and Reykjavík, her work frequently engages relational aesthetics and institutional critique.

== Prizes ==
Hildur Elísa received the 2026 Icelandic Arts Prize Motivational Award for her "exceptionally mature and complex work". The Icelandic Arts Prize is overseen by the Visual Arts Council and hosted by the Icelandic Art Center.

== Early life and education ==
Hildur Elísa completed a diploma in classical clarinet from the Reykjavík College of Music in 2015, and a Bachelor of Fine Arts from the Iceland University of the Arts in 2019. In 2018, she also attended the Kunst und Vermittlung department at Hochschule Luzern through an exchange programme.

In 2024, she completed the temporary programme Re:master Opera (MA-level) at the Sandberg Instituut in Amsterdam.

== Career ==
Hildur Elísa's work has been described as reframing everyday gestures, within operatic performance or contemporary music, to reflect on presence, absence, surreality, grief, and listening dynamics.

In 2023, Juho Myllylä premiered Hildur Elísa's composition for soprano recorder in C and Paetzold Great Bass Recorder in C, her immeasurable soul, at Grachtenfestival in Amsterdam. Later that same year, Myllylä also performed her immeasurable soul at Gaudeamus in Utrecht, and November Music in 's-Hertogenbosch, both in the Netherlands. In August 2023, Hildur Elísa presented Seeking Solace in Outvert Art Space in Ísafjörður, Iceland. In October that same year, she also presented a new video version and a live performance of Seeking Solace at the 2023 Tokyo Biennale in Chiyoda, Tokyo.

In 2024, her operatic work fanfare was shown at O. Festival in Rotterdam, the Netherlands, Hamraborg Festival (Kópavogur, Iceland), during the Sandberg Institute Graduation Exhibition (Amsterdam, the Netherlands), and in SIGN (Groningen, the Netherlands). In June 2024, Hildur Elísa participated in the group exhibition Course in The Living Art Museum, curated by Sunna Ástþórsdóttir and Þorsteinn Eyfjörð, with her piece addolorato. As part of the exhibition, Hildur Elísa's piece ULTRADOLENTE was performed by a nine-piece ensemble on June 27. In August, Hildur Elísa opened the solo exhibition Seeking Solace in Y Gallery (Kópavogur, Iceland).

In 2025, Hildur Elísa participated in het resort's residency and exhibition "doesn't last then does it", which took place in Schouwcafé de Souffleur in Groningen. Hildur Elísa was featured on the Icelandic national broadcaster RÚV’s experimental music programme "Straumar", in conversation with host Árni Matthíasson, in the episode Hið ofurvenjulega er ótrúlega skrýtið (3 June 2025), which included artist reflections and excerpts from her works, such as fanfare and ULTRADOLENTE.

== Selected works ==
- the gospels (2025), a cardgame-driven, operatic performance for a group of overdressed and unapologetically loud women.
- Popsicle's Lament (2025), an operatic for a single performer that sings a lullaby to a popsicle as it melts in their hands.
- fanfare (2024), a series of operatic performances for groups of vocalists and everyday items, in various shapes and sizes, inspired by the city soundscape. Each of fanfare’s movements represents a different means of transportation while highlighting the internal struggles the fast-paced city life invokes.
- Seeking Solace (2023), an operatic office performance that delves into the stark contrast between the outward face of professional life and the internal struggles modern individuals face.
- her immeasurable soul (2023), featured on Juho Myllylä's debut album Herder's Herd, a ten-minute-long piece for soprano recorder in C and Paetzold Great Bass Recorder in C, exploring two contrasting lovers discovering how to bridge the gap between them, or even how to begin to try.
- ULTRADOLENTE (2021), an investigation into the representation of sorrow, particularly male mourning and its representation in society.
- Tacet: Extrinsic (2019), a durational piece for a silent performer sitting within an orchestra, or an ensemble, through a concert. The silent performer is indistinguishable from any other performers on the stage except for the fact that they (the silent performer) never pick up an instrument or make a sound.
- Konzert für Spielzeug und Schwimmbad (2018), a performance for a performer fully submerged in a swimming pool while breathing through a toy instrument.

== Stipends and recognition ==
- Royal Arts Academy, shortlisted in 2026
- Iceland Artists' Salary Fund awarded in 2025
- Mondriaan Fonds Artist Start awarded in 2025
