= Hugleikur Dagsson =

Icelandic artist

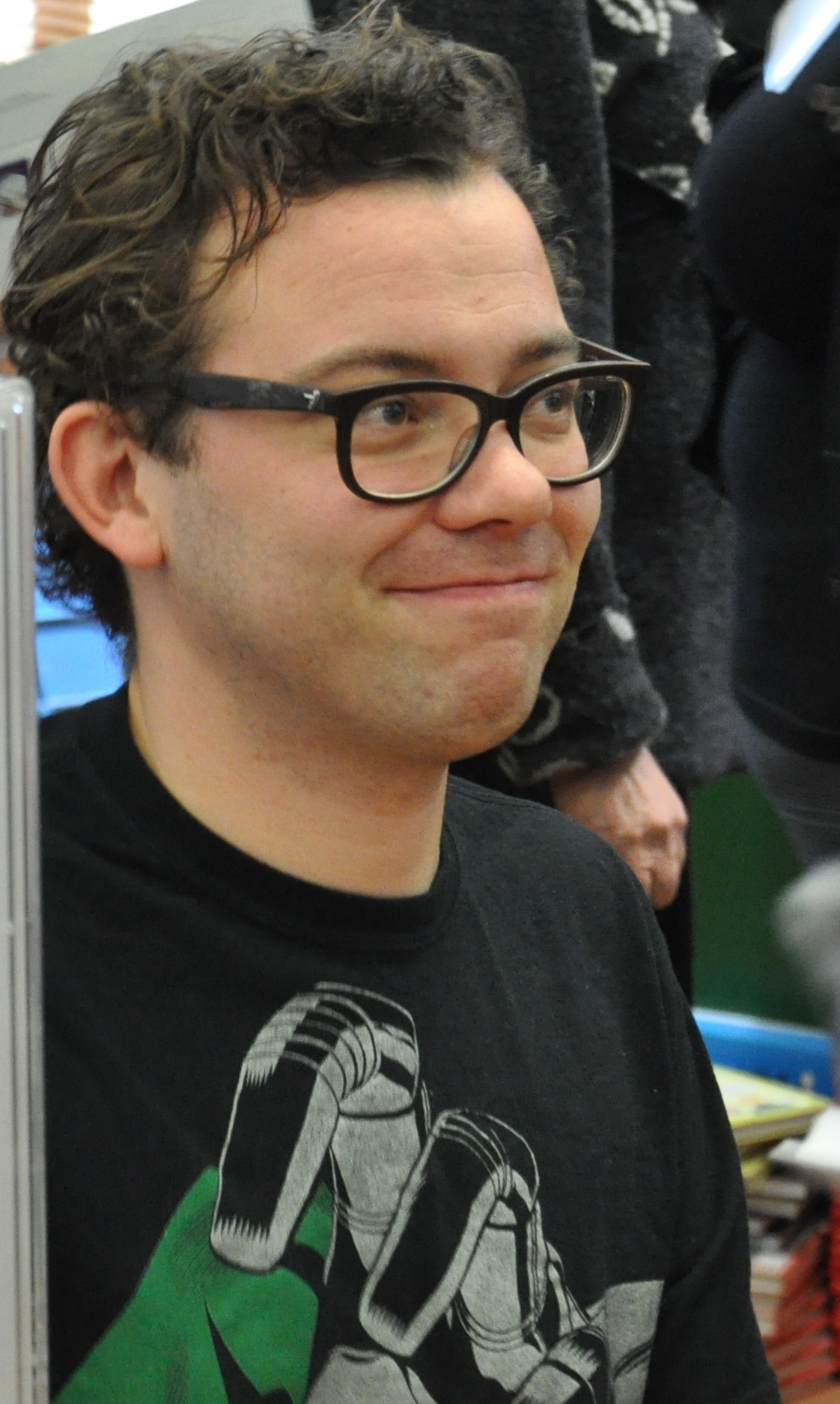
- Hugleikur Dagsson at the Turku Book Fair 2009
- Born: Þórarinn Hugleikur Dagsson; 5 October 1977 (age 49) Akureyri, Iceland
- Areas: Cartoonist, playwright, film critic

Þórarinn Hugleikur Dagsson (Icelandic pronunciation: [ˈθou̯rarɪn.ˈhʏɣleikʏr.ˈd̥axsɔn]), nicknamed Hulli, born 5 October 1977 is an Icelandic artist. He received a B.A. degree from the Iceland Academy of the Arts in 2002.

He was a film critic in a popular Icelandic radio program on Radíó X and hosted another program called Hugleikur on the same station. Hugleikur is known for all kinds of visual and video art. He is most famous for his satirical comics filled with black humor, which have been published as books and in The Reykjavik Grapevine Magazine.

Hugleikur has written three stage plays. The first Forðist okkur (Avoid us), is based on one of his books. It is a story about three dysfunctional families. The second, Leg (Uterus), is a musical about teenage pregnancy in the near future of Iceland. "Baðstofan" (Bathroom) his third play, is a dark vision of Iceland in the 18th century. All plays received rave reviews and Hugleikur received "the playwright of the year" award for Forðist okkur.

In 2006 Penguin Books published Should You Be Laughing at This?, which is a collection of cartoons previously published as Forðist okkur (Avoid us) by JPV books in Iceland. Is This Supposed to be Funny?, the second cartoon book, was published by Penguin Books in October 2007. The third book, Is This Some Kind of joke?, was published in 2008.

== Bibliography ==
=== Stage plays ===
- Forðist okkur (English: Avoid Us), 2006
- Leg (English: Uterus, the musical), 2007
- Baðstofan (English: Living room), 2008

=== Comic books ===
- Elskið okkur (English: Love us) 2002
- Drepið okkur (English: Kill us) 2003
- Ríðið okkur (English: Fuck us) 2004
- Forðist okkur (English: Avoid us). A collection containing, Love, Kill and Fuck Us 2005
- Bjargið okkur (English: Save us) 2005
- Fermið okkur (English: Confirm us) 2006
- Should You Be Laughing at This? The English translation of Forðist okkur, published by Penguin Books 2006
- Fylgið okkur (English: Follow us) 2006
- Eineygði kötturinn Kisi og hnakkarnir (English: Kisi, the one-eyed cat, and the douchebags) 2006
- Ókei bæ! (English: Okay bye!) 2007
- Is This Supposed to Be Funny? The English translation of Bjargið okkur, published by Penguin Books 2007
- Eineygði kötturinn Kisi og Leyndarmálið (English: Kisi, the one-eyed cat, and the Secret) 2007
- Kaupið okkur (English: Buy us) 2007
- Garðarshólmi 2008 (a comic story printed on every page in the Icelandic Telephone Registry)
- Eineygði kötturinn Kisi og Ástandið, fyrri hluti: Annus Horribilis (English: Kisi, the one-eyed cat, and the Situation, part I: Annus Horribilis) 2008
- Ókei bæ tvö (English: Okay bye two) 2008
- Jarðið okkur (English: Bury us) 2008
- Is This Some Kind of Joke?, published by Penguin books 2008
- Garðarshólmi, önnur skorpa 2009 (a comic story printed on every page in the Icelandic Telephone Registry)
- Eineygði kötturinn Kisi og Ástandið, seinni hluti: Flóttinn frá Reykjavík (English: Kisi, the one-eyed cat, and the Situation, part II: Escape from Reykjavík) 2009
- Eineygði kötturinn Kisi og leyndardómar Eyjafjallajökuls (English: Kisi, the one-eyed cat, and the mysteries of the Eyjafjallajökull) 2010 (with Pétur Atli Antonsson)
