= Monika Larsen Dennis =

Swedish sculptor (born 1963)

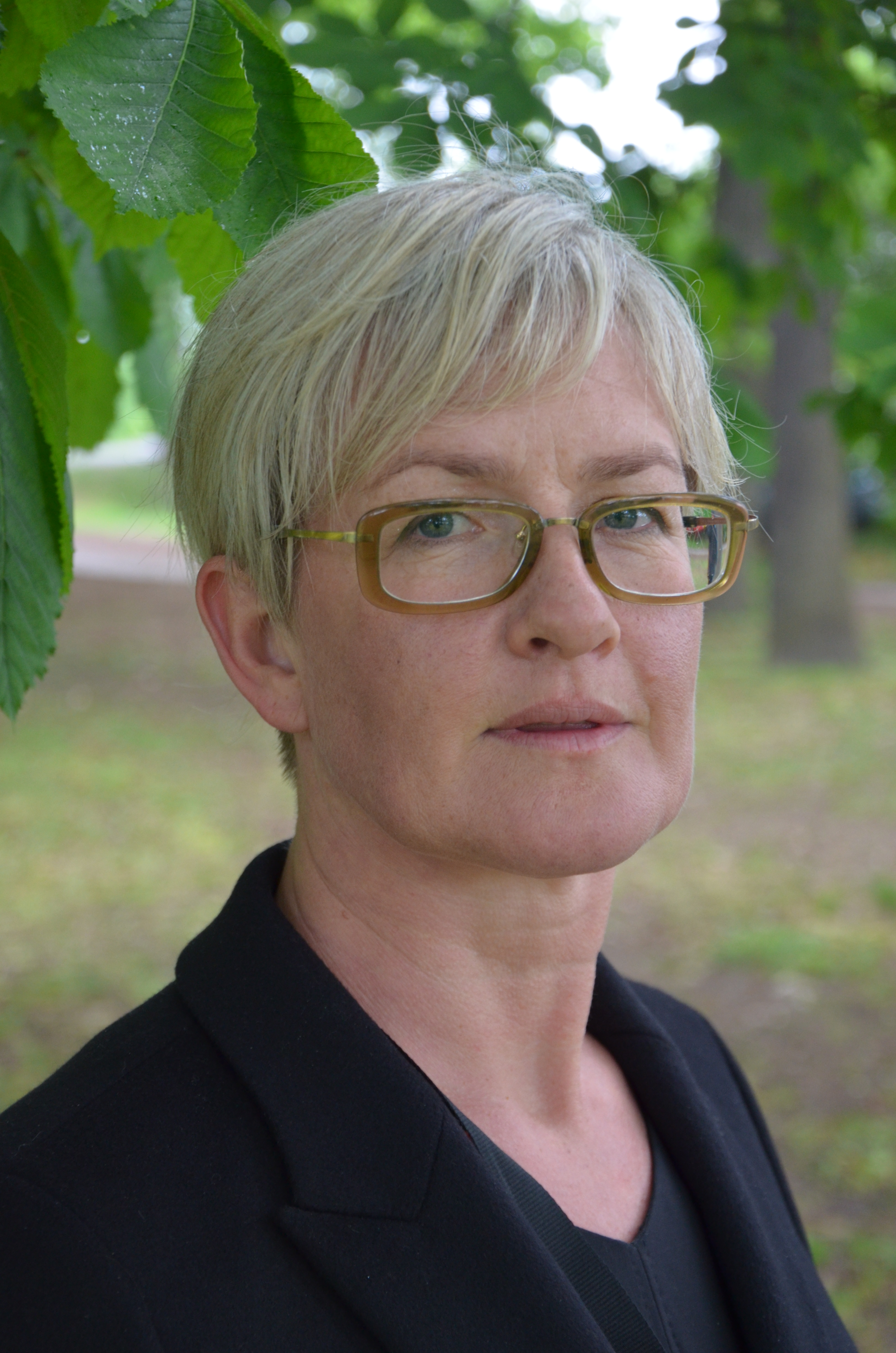
- Born: Monika Kristina Larsen Dennis; 1963 (age 62–63); Malmö, Sweden
- Other name: Monika Larsen-Dennis
- Education: Icelandic College of Art and Crafts, Royal Institute of Art
- Occupations: Visual artist, sculptor
- Known for: Public art in Sweden, sculpture, film, photography, performance art
- Website: Official website

Monika Larsen Dennis (born 1963) is a Swedish contemporary visual artist and sculptor, known for her public art. She has also worked in performance art, photography, and film.

== Early life and education ==
Monika Larsen Dennis was born in 1963 in Malmö, Sweden. She attended Icelandic College of Art and Crafts (Icelandic: Myndlista og Handidaskoli; now part of Iceland University of the Arts), and received a BFA degree (1994). Followed by study at the Royal Institute of Art, where she received a MFA degree (1997).

== Career ==
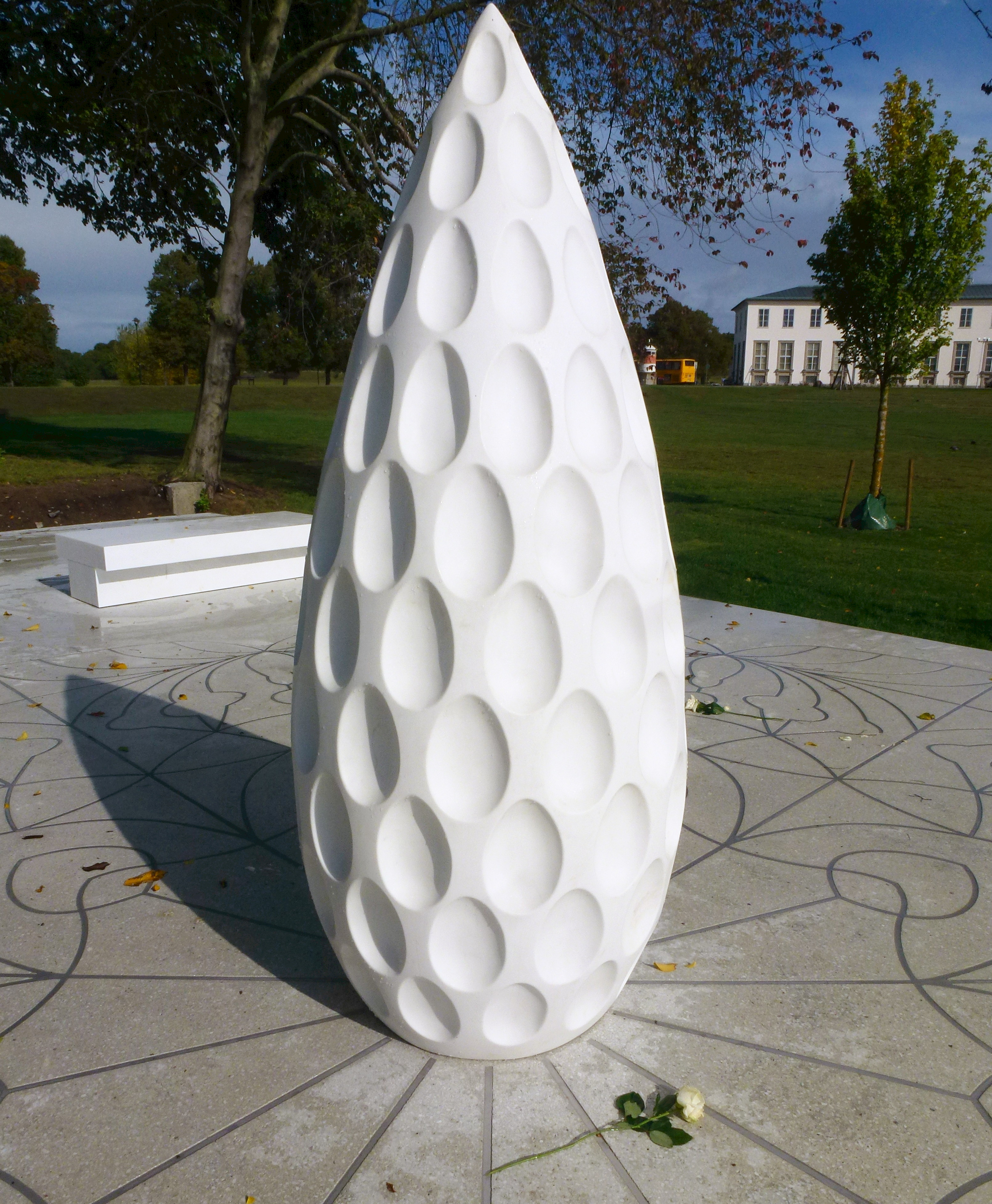
"Restare" (2013), public commission in Djurgården; created by Monika Larsen Dennis

The art film "Driven" (1998) was co-created by Dennis with Maria Friberg, and features two suited bodies in a dance of both attraction and repulsion. In 2001–2002, "Driven" (1998) was exhibited as part of the group exhibition "Loop" at P.S.1 Contemporary Art Center (now MoMA PS1) in Long Island City.

Dennis' work "Hållplats" (English: The Waiting Game) (1999) is a public two-sided art bench, located at Kristianstad.

"Restare" (2013) is a Swedish National Monument for Swedish war veterans, that she won the public commission through an anonymous competition. Her sculpture "Restare" (2013), meaning "to stay" or "to rest" in English, was made of marble, stainless steel, and concrete and is located in the Djurgården district of Stockholm.

In January 2016, she was one of the artists chosen to create artwork for a new subway station in Sweden. Dennis' work was recognized through its inclusion in a major international survey, Global Feminisms (2017) held at the Brooklyn Museum, and curated by Maura Reilly and Linda Nochlin.

She is one of the featured artists of Feminist Art Base at the Brooklyn Museum. Her work is in museum collections including at the Moderna Museet, the Gothenburg Museum of Art, and the Brooklyn Museum.

== Public art ==
- Där (Dare) (1998), glass, auditorium in Malmö University, Malmö, Sweden
- Hållplats (The Waiting Game) (1999), Kristianstad, Sweden
- Kyssen (The Kiss) (2012), marble, Lilla Å Promenade, Örebro, Sweden
- Restare (2013), marble, stainless steel, and concrete, Djurgården, Stockholm, Sweden
- Rose (2015), featuring 6 concrete white pigeons, located at Järla school, Nacka, Stockholm, Sweden
