= Ragnhildur Stefánsdóttir =

Icelandic sculptor born in 1958

- Born: 1958 (age 67–68)
- Education: Carnegie Mellon School of Art (MFA)
- Occupation: Sculptor
- Notable work: Statue of Ingibjörgu H. Bjarnason
- Website: https://ragnhildur.is/about

Rangildur Stefánsdóttir (born 1958) is an Icelandic sculptor.

== Biography ==
Ragnhildur studied at the Icelandic College of Art and Crafts from 1977–1981 and completed her MFA degree at the Carnegie Mellon School of Art in Pittsburgh, Pennsylvania in 1987.

One of Ragnhildur's best-known works is a sculpture of Ingibjörg H. Bjarnason, the first female member of the Althing. The statue is near Skálinn, an extension to the parliament house on Kirkjustræti street in Reykjavík, and was dedicated during a ceremony held on 19 June 2015, the 100th anniversary of women's suffrage in Iceland.
