= Faith Wilding =

Paraguayan-American artist (born 1943)

- Born: 1943 (age 82–83); Paraguay
- Known for: Performance art, installation, multimedia art, arts education
- Notable work: Womanhouse Embyoworld Series, Womb Room, Wall of Wounds, Battle Dresses, War Subjects, Recombinants, subRosa
- Movement: Cyber Feminism, Feminist Art, Performance Art, Critical Studies, Eco Feminism
- Website: Official website

Signature
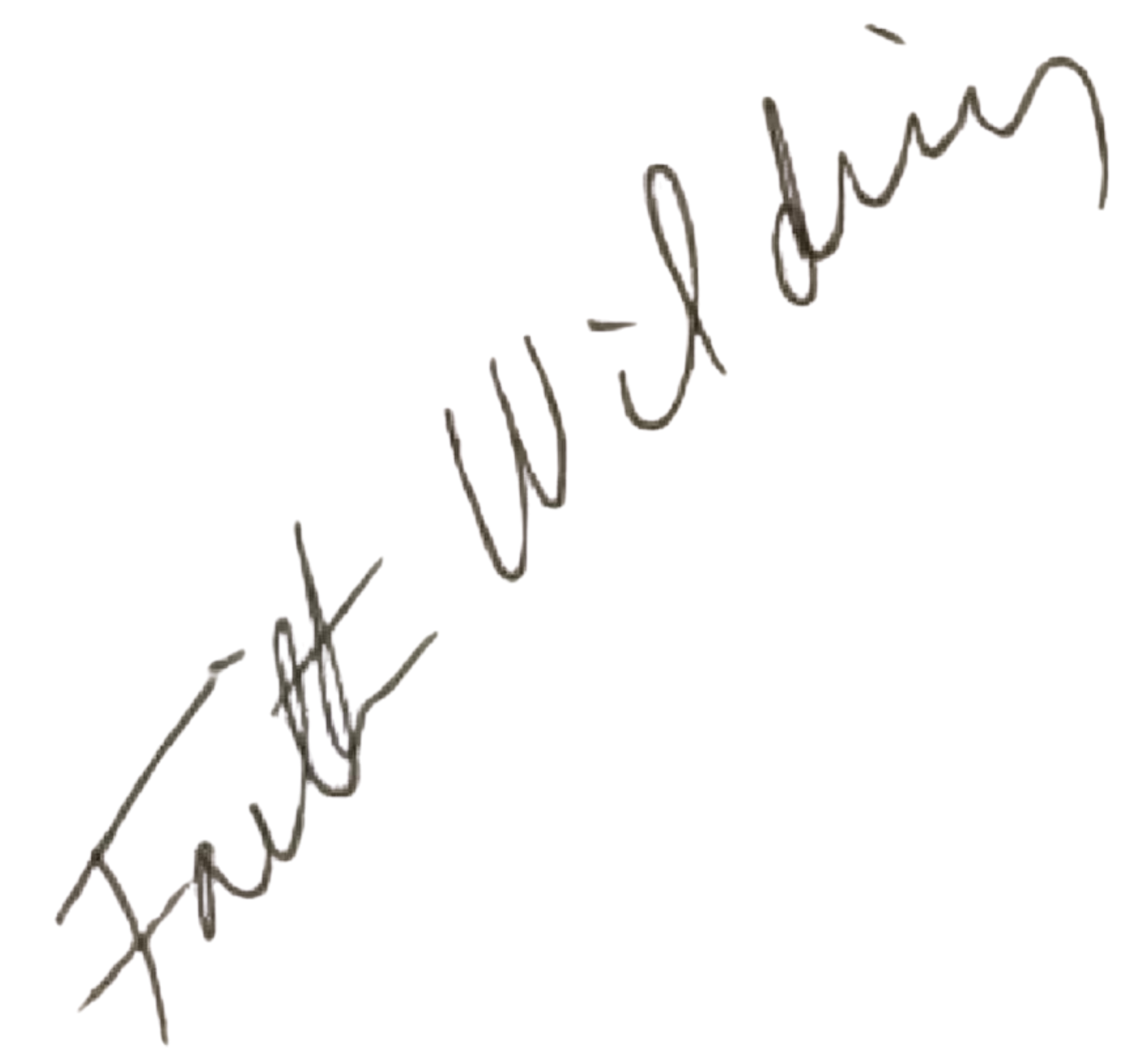

Faith Wilding (born 1943) is a Paraguayan American multidisciplinary artist - which includes but is not limited to: watercolor, performance art, writing, crocheting, knitting, weaving, and digital art. She is also an author, educator, and activist widely known for her contribution to the progressive development of feminist art. She also fights for ecofeminism, genetics, cyberfeminism, and reproductive rights. Wilding is Professor Emerita of performance art at the School of the Art Institute of Chicago.

== Personal life and education ==
Faith Wilding was born in 1943 in Paraguay and emigrated to the United States in 1961. She holds a degree in English from the University of Iowa. In 1969 she began her graduate studies and then received her Master of Fine Arts degree from California Institute of the Arts.

She was married to Everett Frost, an English professor. Wilding and her husband were anti-war activists and members of the Students for a Democratic Society. While in Fresno, Wilding and her friend Suzanne Lacy became activists for the feminist movement.

== Career ==
Wilding became a teaching assistant in the Feminist Art Program Judy Chicago founded at California State University, Fresno, in 1970. While there, she participated in the month-long, ground-breaking feminist exhibition Womanhouse, held in an empty house in Los Angeles in 1972. For Womanhouse she made Crocheted Environment which she originally called Womb Room (1972) as well as the performance work Waiting.

Wilding wrote about the Feminist art movement in her book By Our Own Hands (Los Angeles, 1976). She has worked in various media including art, video, installations, and performances. Her work has been exhibited in North America, Europe and Asia, including at the Bronx Museum of the Arts, the Whitney Museum of Art, and the Drawing Center, all in New York City; in Los Angeles at the Museum of Contemporary Art and the Hammer Museum; the Riverside Art Museum; documenta X, Kassel; Ars Electronica Center, Linz; The Next Five Minutes Festival, Amsterdam; and Reina Sofia Museum, Madrid. Her audio work has been commissioned and broadcast by RIAS Berlin; WDR Cologne; and National Public Radio.

Wilding taught at The School of the Art Institute of Chicago. She has worked as a Research Fellow at the Studio for Creative Inquiry at Carnegie Mellon University, and a faculty member of the Master of Fine Arts in Visual Art Program at Vermont College, Norwich University. She has received several grants and awards in art, including a 2009 Guggenheim Fellowship.

In 2014 Wilding's solo exhibition and retrospective, Fearful Symmetries opened at the Threewalls gallery in Chicago, Illinois. Curated by Shannon Stratton, the exhibition traveled to Rhodes College in Memphis, Tennessee; the Armory Center for the Arts in Pasadena, California; the University of Houston-Clear Lake in Houston, Texas; and the Miller Gallery at Carnegie Mellon University in Pittsburgh, Pennsylvania. The exhibition resulted in the publication of a book by the same name featuring essays by Jenni Sorkin, Amelia Jones, Keith Vaughn, Irina Aristarkova, Mario Ontiveros; Wilding's own writing; and interviews by Daniel Tucker and Mira Schor.

She was interviewed for the 2010 film !Women Art Revolution.

=== subRosa ===
In 1998, Wilding co-founded with artist Hyla Willis, subRosa, a cyberfeminist organization. The manifesto for subRosa states: “subRosa is a reproducible cyberfeminist cell of cultural researchers committed to combining art, activism, and politics to explore and critique the effects of the intersections of the new information and biotechnologies on women’s bodies, lives, and work… Let a million subRosas bloom!”

subRosa has performed, exhibited, lectured and published in the US, Spain, Britain, Holland, Germany, Croatia, Macedonia, Mexico, Canada, Slovenia, and Singapore. Recent Wilding/subRosa performances/exhibitions include: “The Interventionists”, MASSMoCA; “BioDifference” Biennial of Electronic Arts, Perth, Australia; Performance International, Mexico City, and Mérida, Yucatán; “Cloning Cultures,” National University, Singapore; Welcome to the Revolution, Zurich; Art of Maintenance, Kunstakademie, Vienna. Their works include "Feminist Matter(s): Propositions and Undoing", staged for the Pittsburgh Biennial 2011, that invited visitors to discuss the representation of women in the history of science and technology at tea tables. In 2013, the Women's Caucus for Art announced that Wilding will be a 2014 recipient of the organization's Lifetime Achievement Award.

In 2014, threewalls, a non-profit art gallery in Chicago, held the first retrospective of Wilding's work titled "Fearful Symmetries" that featured artwork spanning 40 years.

In 2019, Wilding was featured in her first solo gallery exhibition, "Scriptorium Revisited", at LA-based gallery Anat Ebgi . The show was featured in Artforum .

In 2021, Faith Wilding held a solo exhibition, "Fossils," at Anat Ebgi Gallery in Los Angeles. The show was featured in Contemporary Art Review LA .

== Publications ==
Author

- By Our Own Hands: The Woman Artist's Movement, Southern California, 1970-1976. Santa Monica: Double X, 1977.
- "The Feminist Art Programs at Fresno and CalArts, 1970-75" in The Power of Feminist Art: The American Movement of the 1970s. Eds. Norma Broude and Mary D. Garrard. New York: Abrams,1996, 32–47.
- "Knowing Bodies - Feminist issues in health care, medicine, and biotechnology." Neme.
- "Monstrous Domesticity". M/E/A/N/I/N/G, #18 November 1995.
- "Stolen Rhetoric: The Appropriation of Choice by ART Industries." Neme.
- "Where is Feminism in Cyberfeminism?". Neme. 28 March 2006.

Coauthor or editor

- Domain Errors! Cyberfeminist Practices. Eds. Maria Fernanadez, Faith Wilding, and Michelle M. Wright. Autonomedia, 2003.
- Laura Meyer with Faith Wilding, "Collaboration and Conflict in the Fresno Feminist Art Program: An Experiment in Feminist Pedagogy". n.paradoxa: international feminist art journal vol. 26, July 2010 pp. 40–51.
- subRosa, Faith Wilding. "Bodies Unlimited A decade of subRosa's art practice." n.paradoxa: international feminist art journal. July 2012. 28. pp. 16–25.
- Faith Wilding, Critical Art Ensemble. "Notes on the Political Condition of Cyberfeminism." Art Journal. Summer 1998. 58: 4. pp. 46–59.
- Faith Wilding, Mira Schor, Emma Amos, Susan Bee, Johanna Drucker, María Fernández, Amelia Jones, Shirley Kaneda, Helen Molesworth, Howardena Pindell, Collier Schorr "Contemporary Feminism: Art Practice, Theory, and Activism--An Intergenerational Perspective". Art Journal. Winter, 1999. 58: 4. pp. 8–29.

== Visual work ==
=== Crocheted Environment ===
Nicknamed "Womb Room", this piece is a sculptural installation of a large crocheted, weblike structure. Faith Wilding contributed this one room, crocheted environment within the collaborative 1972 Womanhouse installation put together by the Feminist Art Program at the California Institute for the Arts. The piece was also displayed in the Museum of Contemporary Art, Los Angeles, as well as the Bronx Museum, New York, under “Division of Labor: Women’s Work in Contemporary Art.”

=== Wall of Wounds ===
Wall of Wounds is an installation of 100 Rorschach prints. Each 6” by 6” print is intended to comment on the social culture by proclaiming one's pre-categorized “wound.” Each print is signed and titled based on the nature of the wound: for example, “political wound,” “sexual wound,” or “phallic wound.”

=== Battle Dresses ===
Battle Dresses are a series of paintings entitled “Raped Dress,” “Suppurating Dress,” and “Pregnant Dress.” The series is dedicated to the women of the former Yugoslavia who were raped. The series was created in the period between 1995 and 1997. The entire installation measures 75” by 25” and is done on Vellum using ink and watercolor medium.

=== War Subjects ===
War Subjects is composed of 75” by 50” ink and watercolor drawings, which are “the recombined war body of melancholic historical fragments.”

=== Recombinants ===
Recombinants are a series of drawings, collages, and paintings that speak to the intersection of plant, human, animal and technological bodies. The piece contains visual and intellectual influences derivative of the Cyborg Manifesto.

== Performance work ==
=== Duration performance ===
Wilding gave a performance/lecture on the politics of Information Technology and its relation to femininity as a consequence of the global reconstruction of telecommunication.

=== Waiting ===
In one of her most well-known works, Wilding performed Waiting in Womanhouse while sitting down and rocking back and forth. Waiting is a dramatic monologue that shows the passage of time and that throughout every stage - childhood, teenage years, motherhood, and old age - of her life, a woman is expected to wait: to be noticed, to be married, for her children and husband to come back home, etc. The burden of these societal expectations is framed in the performance through aesthetic choices: a rhythmical tone, the long skirt that Wilding was wearing, with her hands obediently kept on her knees. She is waiting to experience life and to feel accepted by herself and society.

=== Cock and Cunt ===
This was a role-playing exercise written by Judy Chicago and performed by Wilding and Janice Lester in Womanhouse. This is an interaction between a husband (HE), played by Wilding, and a wife (SHE), played by Lester. Both are wearing comically exaggerated genitalia. It starts in the living room with an argument over dishes and ends in the bedroom where the SHE is murdered by the HE. This play highlights the prevalence and danger of gender roles.

=== Invitation To A Burning ===
A mummy-like form filled with plants was burned at the Woman's Building in Los Angeles, California. Individuals participated by filling the burned form with seeds; the seeds sprouted over the course of the three-week installation.

== Sources ==
- "Artist, Curator & Critic Interviews". !Women Art Revolution - Spotlight at Stanford. 2018. Archived from the original on March 26, 2018.
