= Hyla Willis =

American artist and educator

Hyla Willis is an American artist. She is a founding member of subRosa, a feminist art collective and teaches media arts at Robert Morris University. In her work and teaching, Willis uses the cultural and political economies of graphic design, creative experimentation, and acoustic ecology.

== Early life and education ==
Willis was born in Yuba City, California, and lived in Northern California and Seattle, Washington for many years. She received her MFA from Carnegie Mellon University, her BFA from Cornish College of the Arts.

== Career ==
Willis has exhibited, performed and held workshops in Europe, Asia, Australia and throughout North America. Along with Faith Wilding, Willis has been a core member of subRosa. While subRosa started with a feminist critique of art and marketing it's performative and transdisciplinary practice has expanded to include biotech and bio-political feminist issues. In 2002, they won a Creative Capital grant in Emerging Fields.

In 2014, Willis was named Artist of the Year by Pittsburgh Center for the Arts. Her show, titled “America’s Least Livable City and Other Works" referenced the famous ranking in 1985 when Pittsburgh was named America’s most livable city by Rand McNally, while her hometown, Yuba City, Calif., was ranked least livable city on the same list. In 2014, she was a participant in Sites of Passage: Borders, Walls & Citizenship, a cultural exchange between artists from Israel, Palestine and the U.S.
