= Bolshoi (film) =

- Russian: Большой
- Directed by: Valery Todorovsky
- Written by: Anastasiya Palchikova; Ilya Tilkin; Valery Todorovsky
- Produced by: Valery Todorovsky; Anton Zlatopolsky; Maksim Koroptsov; Elena Kozhanova; Anastasiya Biryukova
- Starring: Margarita Simonova; Alisa Freindlikh; Valentina Telichkina; Aleksandr Domogarov; Nicolas Le Riche
- Cinematography: Sergey Mikhalchuk
- Edited by: Aleksey Bobrov
- Music by: Anna Drubich; Pavel Karmanov
- Production companies: Marmot-film; Valery Todorovsky Production Company; Russia-1
- Distributed by: Walt Disney Studios Sony Pictures Releasing (WDSSPR)
- Release date: May 11, 2017
- Running time: 132 minutes
- Country: Russia
- Language: Russian
- Budget: 372 million RUB

Bolshoi (Russian: Большой) is a 2017 Russian drama film directed by Valery Todorovsky, about a young girl from a small mining town who trains to perform as a ballet dancer on the stage of the Bolshoi Theatre in Moscow.

It was released in Russia on May 11, 2017, by Walt Disney Studios Sony Pictures Releasing (WDSSPR).

== Plot ==
The film follows Yuliya Olshanskaya as a ten-year-old girl, as a graduating student, and as a member of the corps de ballet. At ten, Yuliya is dancing in the streets of Shakhtinsk as part of a pickpocket team, and is noticed by Pototskiy, a former star of the Bolshoi, now a deadbeat drunk. He takes Yuliya to the third round of the Bolshoi Ballet Academy audition, asking his former teacher, Galina Beletskaya, to give her a chance. The other ballet mistress, Lyudmila Untilova, is put off by Yuliya's brashness, but Galina appreciates her cheek and charisma, and she is admitted. At the Bolshoi Academy, Yuliya rooms with Karina. They become the star students - with their classmates betting avidly when the two do a fouetté competition - but Karina has the advantage of rich, protective parents. Galina secretly employs Yuliya to clean her apartment, and it is revealed that Galina suffers from memory loss. She tells Yuliya that she has a brilliant future and makes her a present of a pair of sapphire earrings that she herself wore as a ballerina, telling her that she should wear them when she performs the role of Odette on the Bolshoi stage someday. However, Galina later forgets her gift, and Yuliya, accused of stealing the earrings, is nearly expelled. For their graduating performance, Yuliya and Karina vie for the role of Aurora in The Sleeping Beauty. Lyudmila favors Karina, but Galina insists on Yuliya. During vacation, Yuliya returns home for the first time since joining the school, and finds her mother and brothers living hand-to-mouth. Karina's mother had offered Yuliya a bribe to step down from the role of Aurora, and on the day of the performance, Yuliya decides to take the bribe and send the money home. Karina stars in the performance, and goes on to a meteoric career at the Bolshoi, becoming an "international ballerina" while Yuliya stagnates in the corps de ballet. Star French dancer Antoine Duval comes to the Bolshoi to stage Swan Lake for his own retirement performance with Karina as the female lead. He reveals his insecurities to Yuliya during an impromptu drinking session, and needles her own disappointed hopes and belief that she is a failure. After an energetic company class in which she matches Karina fouetté for fouetté, Duval casts her as the substitute lead. Karina turns against Yuliya, who then reveals that Karina's mother bought her the role of Aurora. Perturbed, Karina calls in sick, and Yuliya must perform the lead in Swan Lake. The movie ends with her entrance onto the Bolshoi stage as Odette.

== Cast ==
- Margarita Simonova as Yuliya Olshanskaya
  - Ekaterina Samuilina as Yuliya in childhood
- Anna Isaeva as Karina Kurnikova
  - Anastasiya Plotnikova as Karina in childhood
- Anastasiya Prokofeva as Tatyana 'Tanya' Efremova (as Anastasiya Volynskaya)
  - Anna Tarasenko as Tanya in childhood
- Alisa Freindlich as Galina Beletskaya
- Valentina Telichkina as Lyudmila Untilova
- Aleksandr Domogarov as Vladimir Pototskiy
- Nicolas Le Riche as Antoine Duval

== Production ==
=== Filming ===
The film was shot in Minsk, Belarus, in the town of Kirovsk, Murmansk Oblast and Moscow, Russia - on the historical stage of the Bolshoi Theater.

Dances for the film were staged by Oleg Glushkov, who collaborated with Todorovsky on the set of Stilyagi (film) and The Thaw (TV series). More than 70 professional ballet dancers were involved in the production, and more than 500 costumes were used. One of the roles in the film was played by the French ballet dancer and choreographer Nicolas Le Riche.

== Release ==
In Russia, the premiere took place on May 11, 2017. The television premiere of the film took place on March 9, 2018, on the television channel Russia-1.
