= Gennady Dmitryak =

Russian conductor

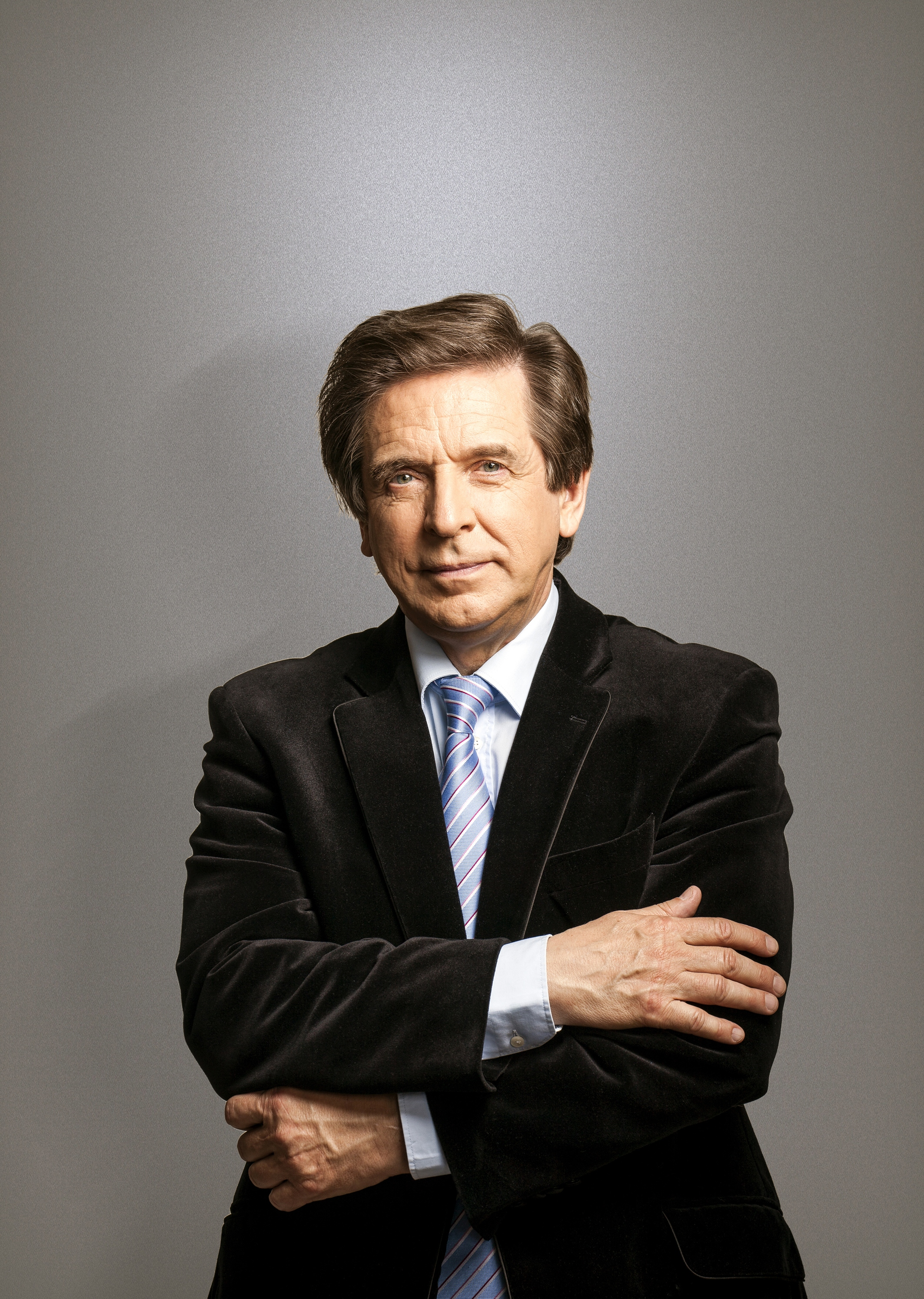
Gennady Dmitryak in 2020

Gennady Dmitryak is a Russian conductor and Meritorious Artist.

== Biography ==
Dmitryak was a graduate of both the Gnessin State Musical College and Moscow Conservatory where he was under guidance from such music teachers as Alexander Yurlov, Kirill Kondrashin, Gennady Rozhdestvensky, Vladimir Minin and others. He has worked with such theatres as the Novaya Opera, Pokrovsky and Stanislavski and Nemirovich-Danchenko Moscow Academic Music Theatres. He also was a conductor of the Moscow State Chamber Chorus under guidance from Vladimir Minin and at the García Lorca Theater of Havana, Cuba. Beginning from 1990s he began traveling throughout Europe and Asia with Moscow Kremlin Capella and later on became both musical director and conductor of the Yurlov State Academic Choir. The choir have appeared on many European and in Russian festivals under Dmitryak's guidance and after it success he became a conductor of both the Svetlanov State Academic and Moscow State Symphony Orchestras.

In 2004 he recorded National Anthem of Russian Federation and was a conductor of the Moscow Kremlin Capella during President Vladimir Putin inauguration the same year. Following that he was a director of choir dedicated to the 60th anniversary of World War II. In December, 2011 he was principal guest conductor at the 4th United Nations's Alliance of Civilizations conference in Qatar.

== Awards and honours ==
In 2010 he was awarded second degree of For Great Services to The Country award. He also was awarded Saint Lord and Master Knyaz Daniil Moscovsky Order from the Russian Orthodox Church for his advocacy in Christian music.
