= Va-Bene Elikem Fiatsi =

Ghanaian multi-disciplinary artist

crazinisT artisT
- Born: Va-Bene Elikem Fiatsi; 1981 (age 44–45); Ho, Ghana
- Education: Kwame Nkrumah University of Science and Technology (KNUST)
- Known for: Multidisciplinary artist
- Elected: LGBT+ Rights Ghana Board
- Website: https://www.crazinistartist.com/

Va-Bene Elikem Fiatsi (born in Ho, Ghana) popularly known as the Crazinst Artist, is a Ghanaian multi-disciplinary artist and the founder and artistic director of perfocraZe International Artists Residency (pIAR) which aims at promoting exchange between international and local artists, activists, researchers, curators, and thinkers.

== Early life and education ==
She was trained as a professional teacher at the E.P Teacher Training college, Amedzofe (College of Education) and graduated in 2006. She was awarded a bachelor's degree in Fine Arts - (Painting) in 2014 and a Master in Fine Arts (AbD) in 2017 from the Kwame Nkrumah University of Science and Technology (KNUST), Kumasi, Ghana.

== Career ==
Va-Bene worked at the Ghana Education Service as a professional Teacher from 2006 to 2010. As a performer and installation artist, She has performed globally and has featured in international magazines and exhibitions. She is currently a performing artist and the Director of PIAR.

== Exhibitions and Performances ==
2017

- Rituals of Becoming

2023

- Sacred Space/Sacred Bodies, Uppsala Sweden (April 27)
- Thy-Queerdom-Cum, Antwerp, Belgium (Upcoming, May 20)

== Activism ==
Va-Bene is currently a board member of the LGBT+ Rights Ghana.

== Awards ==
- 2024 Prince Claus Impact Fund Awards
