= Iceland University of the Arts =

University in Reykjavík, Iceland

Coordinates: 64°08′29″N 21°54′39″W

- Listaháskóli Íslands
- Motto: Curiosity - Understanding - Courage
- Type: Private
- Established: 1998
- Rector: Kristín Eysteinsdóttir
- Students: 598 (2022)
- Location: Reykjavík, Iceland
- Website: www.lhi.is

Iceland University of the Arts (Icelandic: Listaháskóli Íslands [ˈlɪstaˌhauːˌskouːlɪ ˈistlan(t)s]) is an Icelandic institution of higher art education, located in Reykjavík, which offers the only university-level degrees in the arts in Iceland. The institution was founded on 21 September 1998 by consolidating the Iceland Drama School and the Reykjavík Arts School, and classes began in autumn 1999.

== Education ==
Following the standards of the Bologna process, IUA offers bachelor's degree programmes (3 years, 180 ECTS credits, Bachelor of Fine Arts), and master's degree programmes (2 years, 120 ECTS credits, Master of Fine Arts).

There are seven study programmes available at IUA:

- Architecture
- Arts Education
- Design
- Film
- Fine Art
- Music
- Performing Arts

== International collaboration ==
IUA is an active member of the University of the Arctic. UArctic is an international cooperative network based in the Circumpolar Arctic region, consisting of more than 200 universities, colleges, and other organizations with an interest in promoting education and research in the Arctic region.

== Notable alumni & faculty ==
Faculty members of IUA are all practising artists and experts in their field of work. Distinguished former students and faculty members at IUA include:

Fine Art: Bryndís H. Snæbjörnsdóttir, Carl Boutard, Egill Sæbjörnsson, Elín Hansdóttir, Hekla Dögg Jónsdóttir, Hildur Elísa Jónsdóttir, artist, musician, and composer, Hrafnhildur Arnardóttir (Shoplifter), Hugleikur Dagsson, Ólöf Nordal, Ragnar Kjartansson, Sigurður Guðjónsson, Monika Larsen Dennis.

Music: Atli Ingólfsson, composer. Bára Gísladóttir, composer and musician. Guðmundur Steinn Gunnarsson, composer and musician. Hildur Guðnadóttir, composer and musician. Ólöf Arnalds, singer/songwriter and musician, Hildur Elísa Jónsdóttir, composer and musician, Anna S. Þorvaldsdóttir, composer.

Performing Arts: Baltasar Kormákur, director and actor. Ebba Katrín Finnsdóttir, actress. Halldóra Geirharðsdóttir, actress and musician. Hannes Óli Ágústsson, actor. Karl Ágúst Þorbergsson device theatre. Katrín Gunnarsdóttir, dancer and choreographer. Kristín Þóra Haraldsdóttir, actress. Matthías Haraldsson, vocalist of Hatari & playwright. Ólafur Darri Ólafsson, actor. Sigríður Soffía Níelsdóttir, dancer and choreographer. Stefán Karl Stefánsson, film and stage actor. Þorleifur Örn Arnarson, theatre director and playwright.

== See also ==
- Skemman.is (digital library)
