= Atli Ingólfsson =

Icelandic composer (born 1962)

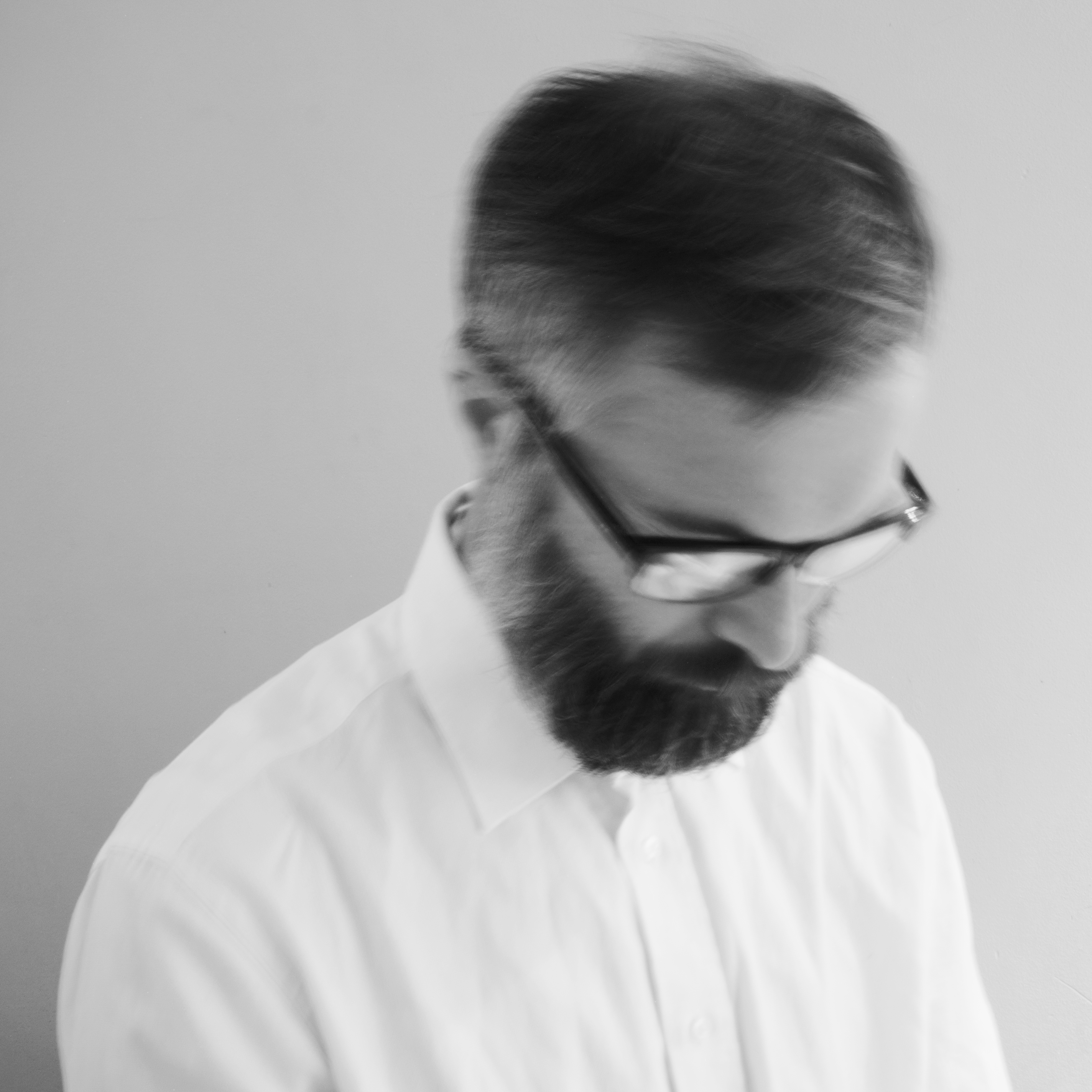
Atli Ingólfsson

Atli Ingólfsson (born 1962) is a composer. His works have been performed in new music festivals across Europe and occasionally overseas. His oeuvre comprises a big range of different works, from solo to orchestral to music theatre. Of his chamber works, the most widely performed might be Object of Terror for chamber group (Ed. Ricordi, Milan), present on his profile CD Enter, issued by BIS in Stockholm in 2005

== Early life and education ==
He was born in Njarðvík, Iceland where he completed his studies in classical guitar, composition and philosophy before proceeding his composition studies in Italy (Milan Conservatory) and France, finally studying privately with Gérard Grisey.

== Career as composer ==
After living in Italy from 1990 to 2005 he returned to Iceland where he presently teaches composition at the Iceland Academy of the Arts. In recent years, Atli has composed three music theatre works which have been staged by Cinnober Theater in Gothenburg, directed by Svante Aulis Löwenborg. These are: Suzannah (on a text by Jon Fosse), 2005, Play Alter Native (text by Finn Iunker), 2011, and Njals saga (text by Ludvig Uhlbors), 2015. "His music has been widely performed at European festivals and concert seasons by groups such as Ensemble InterContemporain, Avanti, the Arditti Quartet, Ensemble L'Itinéraire and the Caput Ensemble. He has also published a book of poetry, and has written on the development of Icelandic prosody from a musical perspective.

His output consists almost entirely of instrumental works, characterized by a brilliant, colorful musical sound. Several of his works reflect his interest in prosody, and rhythm and metrics may be said to occupy a central role in many of them (A verso, Le pas, les pentes, Envoi, La métrique du cri). In his recent work he has increasingly explored the point of contact between timbre, harmony and rhythm, which in his first String Quartet (HZH) leads to a constant dissolution between prevalently timbral, harmonic, or rhythmic situations, all of them issued from the same structural matrix."

== Published works ==
Atli has authored several articles and essays on metrics, music and music theatre and published a method in traditional harmony, Hljómamál. His works are published by Iceland Music.
