= Elizabeth Carpenter =

American fashion designer

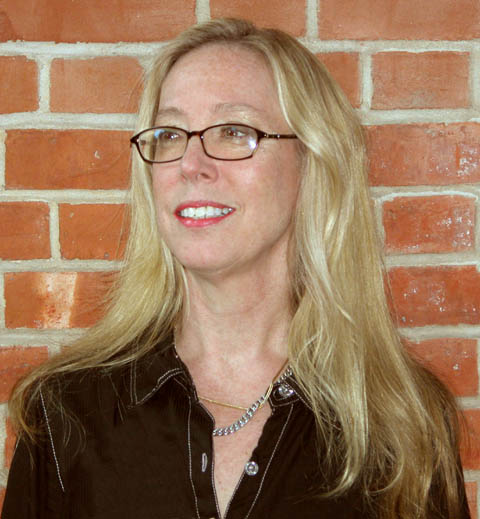
- Born: 1953 (age 72–73)
- Occupations: Author, fashion designer, game designer

Elizabeth Carpenter (born 1953) is an American writer, fashion designer, maze maker, and board game designer. She lives in New York City where she operates her own business, Mazeology LLP.

== Background and education ==
Elizabeth Carpenter grew up in Princeton, New Jersey, and graduated early from Princeton High School. She attended both Carnegie-Mellon University and Rhode Island School of Design, where she studied painting. Her first significant employment was with India Imports of Rhode Island.

== Design career ==
At the age of twenty, Elizabeth Carpenter relocated to Gambia, Africa where, as co-director of West Africa Exports, she began designing clothing. She went on to work for Mast Industries as part of the initial design team for the Limited. In 1984, Carpenter became the Fashion Director of Foxmoor, the juniors' specialty store division of the Melville Corporation. From 1985 to 1996 she founded Elizabeth Carpenter, Inc., an independent garment design studio employing a team of designers, whose clients included the Associated Merchandising Corporation, Ups 'n' Downs, Paul Harris stores, Victoria's Secret, and Palmetto's Jean Company. During this time, Carpenter was also the Fashion Director for Brooks Fashions, and provided fashion-trend forecasting for Shop Shots from 1994 to 1996, at thich time she left the fashion industry to begin a career in writing.

== Writing and maze design ==
Elizabeth Carpenter co-authored two family guide books with her son, Samuel Freund: Kids Eat New York and Kids Eat Broadway, in 1997 and 1999 respectively. She also began developing an original art style that weaves a maze path through original line-art illustrations. Carpenter's first book of mazes, DinoMaze: The Colossal Fossil Maze Book, was published with the American Museum of Natural History in November 2001, by Workman Publishing and has earned the 2012 IPPY Gold Medal for Children's Interactive Books. She was approached by the Metropolitan Museum of Art and designed her second maze book, Mummy Maze: The Tomb Treasures Maze Book in 2007, which earned the Bronze Award in the Children's Interactive category at the 2008 IPPY Awards. Mummy Mazes was published by Workman Publishing in Fall, 2010. Both books weave history, problem solving, and art into a story intended to make learning fun.

In 2007, Elizabeth Carpenter founded the company, Mazeology Design, to expand the concept of maze art to include games, toys, and diaries. Her first venture into board games, Senet: The Ancient Tomb Treasures Game, features an adapted rulebook that modernizes the ancient game. In 2009 the game was included in Games Magazine's Top 100 Games and was curated into the Egyptian collection at the Brooklyn Museum of Art. The game has earned the Dr. Toy's Play and Learn Award, the Parents' Choice Award, the Seal of Approval from The National Parenting Center, and the Family Review Center Best of The Best Award for 2009.

== Works ==
- Author, Kids Eat New York, 1997, The Little Bookroom.
- Author, Kids Eat Broadway, 1999, Kids Eat Publishing.
- Author/Illustrator for DinoMaze: The Colossal Fossil Maze Book, 2000, republished 2010 by Workman Publishing.
- Designer/Illustrator for Mummy Maze: The Ancient Tomb Treasures Maze Book, 2005, republished 2010 by Workman Publishing.
- Designer/Illustrator for Senet: The Ancient Tomb Treasures Game, 2008.
- Designer/Illustrator for Jurassic Chess and Checkers, 2008.
- Designer/Illustrator for the My Glitter Diary collection for Babalu, Inc.
- Designer/Illustrator for the My Invisible Diary collection for Babalu, Inc.
- Designer/Illustrator for "Enchanting Mandala Mazes," 2017, Get Creative 6 (Soho Publishing)
