= Ragna Róbertsdóttir =

Icelandic painter (born 1945)

- Born: 1945 (age 80–81); Reykjavík, Iceland
- Occupation: Artist
- Notable work: Á mörkum málverksins; Two landscapes

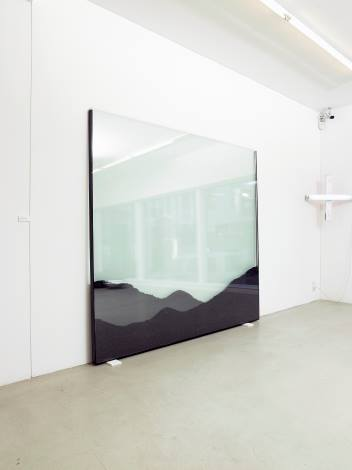
Lava from Hekla by Ragna Róbertsdóttir

Ragna Róbertsdóttir (born 1945 in Reykjavík) is an Icelandic artist. She was educated in Iceland and Sweden.

== Life and education ==
Ragna Róbertsdóttir studied at the Icelandic College of Art and Crafts in the 1960s during the time of Kurt Zier and Hörður Ágústsson. The school at the time still placed a lot of emphasis on drawing, although students there were taught the basic principles in applying different techniques and media. After finishing graduate school at Konstfack in Stockholm between the years of 1970–1971, Ragna participated in an awakening that emerged in women's art in the 1970s.

== Career ==
Ragna, together with 11 other women, founded Gallerí Langbrók. The gallery's last exhibition was held in 1985. Then, in the early 1980s, Ragna began to make the art that she is known for today. At that time, natural materials became the dominant medium in her work, much of it consisting of sod and lava rock. In Ragna's art, sod is placed together in large rolls that form variously sized installations. She also uses lava rock that has been sawed down into little pieces, which are arranged and laid over the installations. She has mainly exhibited her work in Iceland, but also in other countries like France, Switzerland, Germany, Denmark, the United Kingdom, and Norway.

== Notable works ==
- The Akureyri Art Museum in 2013: On Guðrúnar Einarsdóttir and Ragna Róbertsdóttir's exhibitions by Margrét Ólafsdóttir
- i8 Gallery, January 17, 2013: Ragna Róbertsdóttir
- National Gallery of Iceland 2003: Á mörkum málverksins ("On the Limits of Art")
- Akademie Schloss Solitude 1999: Two landscapes
