= James Duesing =

American animator and educator

James Duesing (born 1958) is an American animator and educator. He has worked in many forms of animation, from traditional hand drawn and early digital work to 3D and motion capture projects. His 1990 animation Maxwell's Demon is considered one of the earliest examples of creative use of desktop computing for animation production. Duesing has taught at The University of Cincinnati, College of Design, Architecture, Art and Planning and is a professor at Carnegie Mellon University.

Duesing's work has been exhibited and broadcast throughout the world including: The Sundance Film Festival, SIGGRAPH, The Tate Gallery, Film Forum, and The Museum of Modern Art, New York. He has received numerous awards and grants including a Creative Capital grant, an award of distinction and an honorable mention from Prix Ars Electronica, an American Film Institute Independent Filmmaker Fellowship, National Endowment for the Arts grants, and a residency at the Headlands Center for the Arts.

== Education and background ==
Duesing studied painting and writing at the University of Cincinnati earning a BFA in 1980. He also received his MFA in film and video from the University of Cincinnati in 1983. While there he studied writing with Terry Stokes, animation with Caroline Leaf, Carmen D'Avino, Richard Protovin, Louis Rockwood and video with Jud Yalkut. After graduate school Duesing worked on live action video and television projects while continuing to work on hand drawn animation. During this time he was exposed to, and began to explore, early digital imaging techniques on mainframe computers. In 1986 he went shopping for a typewriter and ended up buying a desktop computer. This began his experiments with what then was considered low-end digital imaging. In 1986 he was hired as an assistant professor at the University of Cincinnati. In 1997 he moved to Carnegie Mellon University as an associate professor.

== Work ==
Duesing's animation work is visually lush and playful. In all of his work there are no cuts. His animation does not appear to be edited in any way. Instead of simply cutting away, metamorphosis continuously changes characters and environments to fit a new scene. Reality is often subjugated to emotional and relationship themes. As his work developed from hand drawn to 3D computer the technical complexity of this metamorphosis increased.

There are several themes that reoccur in Duesing's animation. These themes include: how fear or confusion affects decisions and how humanity is altered through cosmetic culture, technology and social media. The themes are often handled simultaneously on different levels, sometimes with sarcasm or subtle humor, other times characters are emotionally void. His characters usually have some particular flaw, whether physical or emotional. Through metamorphosis all of these themes are interconnected, usually with an open-ended resolution.

Duesing's animation frequently offers comical and eccentric reflections on human interactions and desires in a realm poisoned by environmental disaster, cut off from nature or populated by smooth operators and creepy manipulators. On one level his imagery is composed of entertaining cartoon-like characters in various kinds of richly rendered environments. On another level his work probes serious sociological issues in a way that is both provocative and disturbing. This futuristic landscape, can feel curiously familiar. Phantom relationships, in which hybrids of animals and humans communicate through fragments of conversations, often sound like clips from forgotten films or television shows. The narratives can be ambiguous, unfolding with the logic of dreams and the speed of cyber-communication.

Duesing has spoken and taught about animation in the context of social history. He has also discussed his perceptions on the relationship between historic works of art and the desire for artists throughout the millennia to represent motion and sequence in their work. These interests can also be seen in his work.

Duesing has done collaborative installation work and been involved in a variety of print and book projects. His frequent collaborator is Carnegie Mellon Computer Science Professor, Jessica Hodgins. His print and installation projects relate to his animation work with characters and sequential action. They are frequently flipbooks, character portraits or comic books.

List of Animated Work

Impetigo, 1983, 5 min. 16mm original, hand drawn. Impetigo is the story of passion and possession in a steamy nocturnal landscape.

Tugging The Worm, 1987, 10 min, 16mm. original, hand drawn. The story of characters that enjoy seeing murders acted out for entertainment. They talk about going places and eating things. They dream of spending their life with someone or getting away from the one with whom they're spending their life. They are told to be safe they must not touch; yet sometimes they touch. Sometimes they strike. Sometimes they dance. Sometimes they hold it all in.

Maxwell's Demon, 1990, 8 min, color, computer generated animation. When their culture shifts to being information- and service-based, industrialists are corralled on a reservation named Lorado, to sell plastic things as remnants of their past traditions. The reservation is built on a polluted lake, which is a tourist attraction. In Lorado there are many forms of love and every one keeps a pet.

Law of Averages, 1996, 15 min, color, computer generated. In a garden two lovers meet and begin a relationship that is complicated by a lack of exact compatibility, daily compromise and occasional sensuousness. An interactive theater called The Big Ghost is the temptation in this exotic urban paradise.

Tender Bodies, 2003, 8 min. computer generated. Tender Bodies imagines a time when genetic experiments become an elite hobby. The creatures created are hunters and hunted and one unusual specimen becomes the entertainment at a strange party.

End of Code, 2009, 15 min. computer generated. The story revolves around two groups of misfit hackers in a city of traffic. They speak a language of advertising, corporate branding and self-help, while engaging in a battle to control traffic lights. Discovering that the entire social code is embedded in the access code that regulates traffic lights, begins a twisted ride of surveillance, disguises and espionage among characters caught in an endless rush hour.

Gray Elegy, 2015. An abstraction of motion and sound derived from motion capture and physical simulations. Inspired by the Dylan Thomas poem Lie Still, Sleep Becalmed, a buoyant character struggles with hazards in a cloudy gray environment. Adulting 2023- a moving auto fiction and story telling hybrid animation that traces the deep wounds and glories of Love and Memory.
