= Sergey Shustitsky =

Russian composer

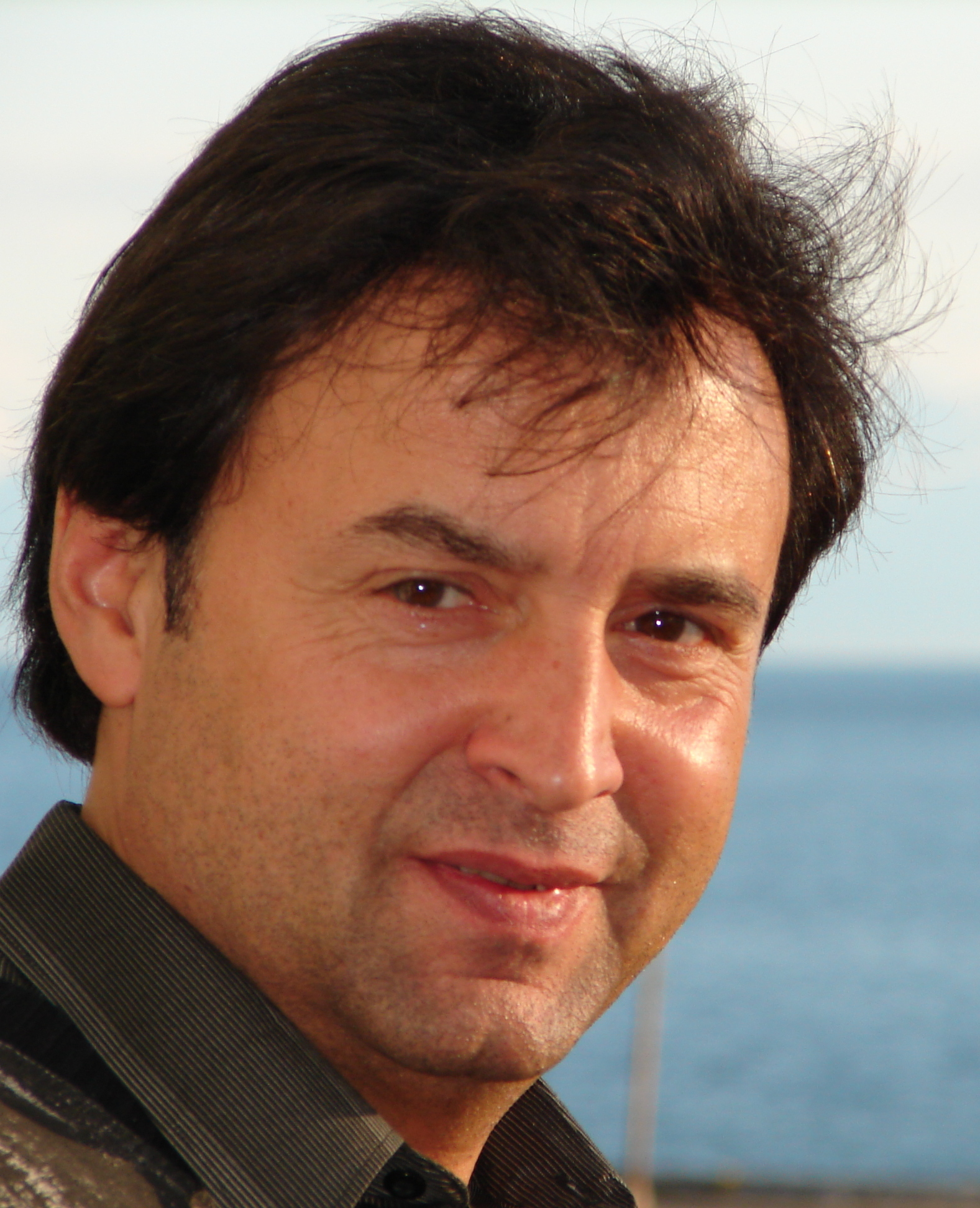
- Born: 8 February 1958 (age 67); East Berlin, GDR
- Occupations: musician, tv presenter, showman
- Years active: 1982–present
- Title: Honored Artist of the Russian Federation (2000)

Sergey Yuryevich Shustitsky (Russian: Серге́й Ю́рьевич Шусти́цкий) is a Soviet and Russian musician, TV presenter, showman. He has been a member of the Composers' Union (since 1985) and is an Honored Artist of the Russian Federation (2000).

In 1982 he graduated from the Moscow Conservatory, in 1990–1991 he trained in the US, worked as an arranger for the Paramount studios, 20th Century Fox.

On television in 1979. He is a member of the Russian Television Academy.

He has composed several symphonic and chamber works.
