= N'Goné Fall =

Senegalese architect and curator

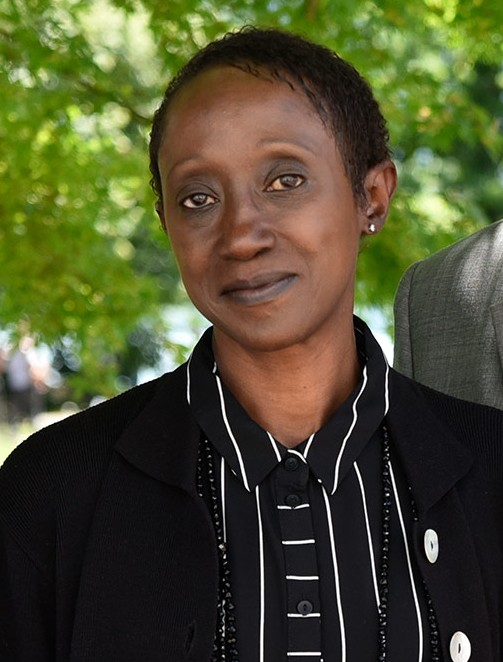
- N'Goné Fall in 2019
- Born: 1967 (age 58–59); Dakar Senegal
- Occupation: Architect

N'Goné Fall is a Senegalese curator, editor, and cultural policies consultant.

== Early life and education ==
N'Goné Fall was born in 1967 in Dakar Senegal where she grew up. She graduated with honors from the École Spéciale d'Architecture in Paris and received the prize of the best 1993 graduation project under the supervision of her professor Paul Virilio, a French theoretician.

== Career ==
In 1994, Fall left the François Gréther architecture studio to join Revue Noire, the first contemporary African art magazine, as editorial assistant before becoming editorial director in 1996 until the closing of the publishing house late 2001.

Fall is the editor of Photographers from Kinshasa (D. R. Congo), Éditions Revue Noire, 2001. 128 pages (ISBN 2-909571-53-X); and of An Anthology of African Art: The Twentieth Century, New York, D.A.P./Distributed Art Publishers, Inc., 2002, 408 p. (ISBN 1-891024-38-8)

Fall has been an independent curator, writer and cultural policies specialist since 2001, conducting projects in Europe, Africa, Asia, the Caribbean and the USA.

Fall curated her first exhibition in 1996 during Dak'Art, the contemporary African art biennale in Dakar, Senegal. She was a guest curator at the African Photography Encounters of Bamako, Mali in 2001 and at the Dakar contemporary African art biennale, Senegal in 2002. Amongst her curatorial activities: Africa by Africans, a century of African Photography at the Iziko South African National Gallery and at the Castle of Good Hope in 1998 in Cape Town, South Africa; En Français sous l'image at the Maison Européenne de la Photographie in 2006 in Paris, France; Contact Zone at the National Museum of Mali in 2007 in Bamako, Mali; Localities at the Contemporary art Museum in 2009 in Roskilde, Denmark; When things fall apart: Critacal voices on the radars at the Trapholt Museum in 2016 in Kolding, Denmark; In Quest of Freedom: carte blanche to El Anatsui at La Conciergerie in 2021 in Paris, France.

Fall contributed to the catalogue of the exhibition Global Feminism at the Brooklyn Museum in 2007 with the essay Providing a Space of Freedom: Women Artists in Africa.

Fall worked as professor at the Senghor University in Alexandria, Egypt from 2007 to 2011.

Fall is also the author of strategic plans and orientation programs for national and international cultural organizations.

In 2018, Fall was appointed by French President Emmanuel Macron General Commissioner of the Africa2020 Season, a series of more than 1,500 cultural, scientific and pedagogical projects held all over France from December 2020 to September 2021.

In 2024, Fall was part of the selection committee that chose Naomi Beckwith as the artistic director of Documenta Sixteen.
