= Suzie Silver =

American artist

- Education: BA University of California, MFA The School of the Art Institute Chicago
- Known for: Performance Art
- Website: https://suziesilver.com/

Suzie Silver is an American artist based in Pittsburgh, Pennsylvania, whose artistic focus lies primarily in queer video and performance art. Silver received her MFA from the School of the Art Institute in of Chicago in 1988 and her undergraduate degree from the University of California in 1984 and is currently a professor at Carnegie Mellon University in the School of Art.

Silver’s work has been exhibited and screened both nationally and internationally at such venues as The New Museum, The Whitney Museum of Art, Documenta, ICA Boston, Pacific Film Archives, and in Gay and Lesbian Film/Video Festivals all over the world including London, Melbourne, Tel Aviv, San Francisco, Chicago, New York City, Sao Paulo, Auckland and many more. She has performed nationally at venues including Chicago Filmmakers and Club Lower Links, Chicago, Pittsburgh Center for the Arts, NYSCC at Alfred University, and Transformer Gallery in Washington, DC.

Silver’s background in performance art stems from her participation in the Chicago art community in the late 1980s and early 1990s that centered around Randolph Street Gallery, Name Gallery, and Club Lower Links, hosting artists such as Karen Finley, Dominique Dibbel, Tim Miller, and many more who created performance art that mirrored daily life, pop culture, politics, globalization, and evolving post-AIDS concerns of gender, sex and the body.

== Life and career ==
Silver spent her youth in San Diego. She came out as a lesbian in the 1980s. Silver received her BA from the art program at University of California, San Diego in 1984 and her MFA from The School of the Art Institute of Chicago (SAIC) in 1988. She worked as an Assistant Editor on television shows including Homicide: Life on the Street. Additionally, she was the director of the 1988 film Peccatum Mutum (The Silent Sin) which examines the personal lives of Catholic nuns. Silver resides in Pittsburgh and is a faculty member in Electronic and Time-Based Art at Carnegie Mellon University. She has worked closely with other artists including Hilary Harp and Eric Moe, having collaborated with the former since 2003. Silver’s experience with her sexuality often influences her art exhibitions. Silver's work has been recently showcased at the New Museum and Video Data Bank collaborative exhibition "Histories of Sexuality" and was also featured in the landmark 1986-1987 New Museum exhibition "Homo Video." Her film and video work is distributed by Video Data Bank at School of the Art Institute of Chicago.

== Selected exhibition and screening venues ==
- Miller Institute of Contemporary Art
- Scottsdale Museum of Contemporary Art
- Pittsburgh Glass Center
- The Whitney Museum of Art
- The New Museum
- Documenta
- ICA Boston
- ICA London
- Pacific Film Archives
- Anthology Film Archives
- London Film Festival
- Seoul Film Festival
- Gay and Lesbian Film/Video Festivals all over the world including Melbourne, London, Tel Aviv, San Francisco, Chicago, NYC, São Paulo, Auckland and many more.

== Works ==
As an artist, Silver focuses primarily in video, performance, and sound. She utilizes her own experiences within the LGBTQ+ as a way to explore within these visual art forms. In 1992, Silver created a performance video called "A Spy" in which Jesus is seen as a vibrant and queer manifestation, with a song by The Doors playing in the background. In 1993, Silver created a spoof video based on Lynard Skynard's "Freebird", which was the title of the spoof as well. She took on all acting roles for this spoof video where she was bending gender roles within the 1970s straight culture that was portrayed in the video's original debut.

Strange Attractors: Investigations in Non-Humanoid Extraterrestrial Sexualities was published by The Institute of Extraterrestrial Sexuality and Encyclopedia Destructica in 2012. The exhibition and resultant book "commemorates Kepler with art, writing and film that envision the sexualities of beings that may someday be encounter - if not in outer space then at least our dreams." Silver was one of three curators for the exhibition and wrote the book's introduction. In 2013, Silver created a video project by the name, "Trans Q Television". This show discusses the topics of gender fluidity and expression through collaborating with other LGBTQIA+ artists. Some of the artists featured include; Alaska Thunderfuck 5000, Zackary Drucker, Rhys Ernst, Mikey McParlane, Erica Gressman, House of Ladosha, and Le1f.

As aforementioned, Suzie Silver has worked on several projects with Hilary Harp. In 2015, they took on creating a video project titled, Fairy Fantastic, which was a television show specifically dedicated to gender non-conforming children. Fairy Fantastic was a way to show children how fairytales could be told through non-traditional concepts regarding gender identity and how various forms of expression can be taught to children who have no former knowledge of the gender binary.
