= Egill Sæbjörnsson =

Icelandic artist (born 1973)

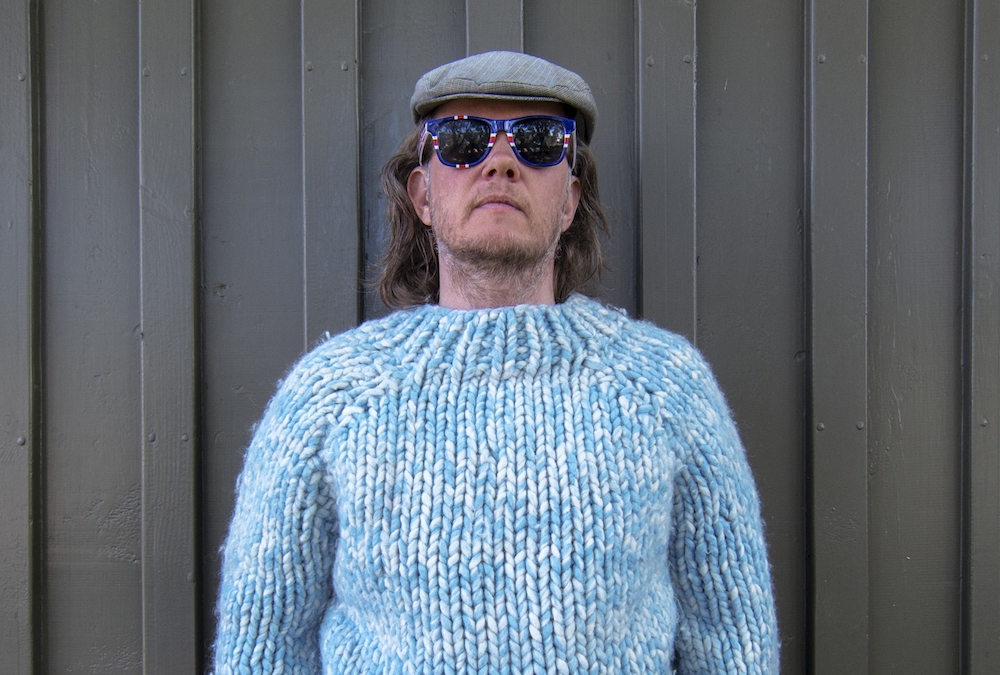
- Egill Sæbjörnsson in 2016
- Born: 1973 (age 52–53); Reykjavík, Iceland
- Education: Icelandic College of Art and Crafts; Paris 8 University Vincennes-Saint-Denis
- Website: egills.de

Egill Sæbjörnsson (born 1973) is an Icelandic visual artist, filmmaker, musician and architecture interventionist. He lives and works between Berlin and Reykjavík. Sæbjörnsson's work brings together 3D environments, digital projections, technology, and sound. These range from small intimate installations in museum and gallery settings to larger-scale permanent architectural installations. Sæbjörnsson conceives his work as a technological continuation of painting and sculpture, exploring the space between the virtual and physical. His works have been exhibited in The Martin Gropius Bau, Royal Academy of Arts in London, MoMA PS1 in New York, The Watermill Center, Museum of Modern Art Sydney, Museum of Contemporary Art Seoul, Galleria Nazionale d'Arte Moderna in Rome, The Hamburger Bahnhof Berlin, Frankfurter Kunstverein, Amos Rex, Moderna Museet in Stockholm, Oi Futuro Rio de Janeiro, Dakar Biennale, and The National Gallery of Prague. He represented Iceland at The 57th Biennale Arte in Venice, and in 2019 he was nominated for the Ars Fennica Award in Finland. He lectures and contributes to various publications.

"Stone Ball, 2014" is Sæbjörnsson's public art installation in Berlin commissioned by Robert Koch Institute. It's a massive concrete block with a stone hemisphere with computer-controlled projection.

== Exhibitions ==
- 2022 Object Species – Virtuality. KW Kunstwerke Berlin e.V. and The Living Art Museum Reykjavík. Part of KW Digital Platform series, curated by Nadim Samman. Reykjavík Art Festival.
- 2022 Egill Sæbjörnsson – Object Species: Sculptures. Kummelhomen together with Moderna Museet, Vårberg Centrum and Andys gallery, Stockholm. Cur: Torbjörn Johannson, Catrin Lundqvist, Maaike Gouwenberg and Andy Ludvigsson
- 2023 The Girl from Ahlen – Part II. Kunstmuseum Ahlen. Ahlen.
- 2023 Egill Sæbjörnsson & Infinite Friends of the Universe. National Gallery of Iceland. Cur: Arnbjörg María Danielsen
- A Way to Pleasure, Art Basel, 2015
- The Inner Life of Things.

== Venice Biennale ==
In 2017 Sæbjörnsson represented Iceland in the 57th Venice Biennale. He chose two Icelandic trolls, Ūgh and Bõögâr. for the Icelandic Pavilion.

== Articles ==
- "A Complicated Surface." The Warp of Time. Mnemosyne Projects. 2024

== Books ==
- Egill Sæbjörnsson and Infinite Friends of the Universe, 2023.
- The Book, Anagram Book 2009
