= Loveless (film) =

2017 film by Andrey Zvyagintsev

- Film poster
- Russian: Нелюбовь
- Romanization: Nelyubov
- Directed by: Andrey Zvyagintsev
- Screenplay by: Oleg Negin; Andrey Zvyagintsev
- Produced by: Alexander Rodnyansky; Sergey Melkumov; Gleb Fetisov
- Starring: Maryana Spivak; Aleksey Rozin; Matvey Novikov; Marina Vasilyeva; Andris Keišs
- Cinematography: Mikhail Krichman
- Edited by: Anna Mass
- Music by: Evgueni Galperine; Sacha Galperine
- Production companies: Arte France Cinéma; Why Not Productions; Les Films du Fleuve
- Distributed by: Sony Pictures Releasing (Russia); Pyramide Distribution (France); Lumière Publishing (Benelux); Alpenrepublik Filmverleih (Germany)
- Release dates: 18 May 2017 (Cannes); 1 June 2017 (Russia)
- Running time: 127 minutes
- Countries: Russia; France; Belgium; Germany
- Language: Russian
- Box office: $4.8 million

Loveless (Russian: Нелюбовь, romanized: Nelyubov) is a 2017 drama film (Note: The film has been categorized as a drama, family drama, or crime thriller, with mystery elements, and tragic elements.) directed by Andrey Zvyagintsev, who co-wrote it with Oleg Negin. The story concerns two separated parents, played by Maryana Spivak and Aleksey Rozin, whose loveless relationship has decayed into a state of bitterness and hostility. They are temporarily drawn back together after their only child goes missing and they attempt to find him.

The story was inspired by the search-and-rescue group Liza Alert and Zvyagintsev's desire to make a film about a family. He was originally interested in making a Russian reworking of the 1973 Swedish miniseries Scenes from a Marriage but could not obtain the rights. Loveless was produced with international support after the Russian government disapproved of Zvyagintsev's 2014 anti-corruption film Leviathan. As a result, Loveless is a co-production of Russia, France, Belgium and Germany. Cinematographer Mikhail Krichman used a realistic style during filming in Moscow in 2016. Although Zvyagintsev said he had no interest in politics, he incorporated a skeptical view of the police into the film. Themes include parental neglect, the state of lovelessness or nelyubov, (Note: Zvyagintsev denied the use of "lovelessness" in the English translation was the equivalent of the Russian concept of "nelyubov"; according to critic Robert Koehler; the Russian word refers to a state of "anti-love" rather than the absence of love.) and bleak environments.

Loveless opened to critical acclaim and won the Jury Prize at the 2017 Cannes Film Festival. Critics viewed it as a gripping story of a family crisis and a statement on life in Russia. It won two European Film Awards, including Best Cinematographer for Krichman, as well as the César Award for Best Foreign Film, and was nominated for Best Foreign Language Film at the 90th Academy Awards.

== Plot ==
October 2012, Moscow. Children are leaving school. A twelve-year-old boy named Alyosha walks along a path through a wooded area on the outskirts of town. He throws a strip of tape onto a tree. His parents, Zhenya and Boris, are divorcing and are trying to sell their apartment. Both parents have new relationships: Boris with Masha, a young woman who is pregnant with his child; and Zhenya with Anton, an older and wealthier man with an adult daughter. Alyosha overhears a fight between his parents, neither of whom claim to want him and are considering placing him in an orphanage.

One day after spending most of the night with Anton, Zhenya realizes Alyosha has not been seen since the day before. The police believe Alyosha has run away and will return home within a day or two. When Alyosha does not return, a volunteer group specializing in the rescue of missing persons takes over the case and begins searching for the boy. The only relative Alyosha could have sought refuge with is Zhenya's estranged mother, who lives several hours away. Boris and Zhenya visit Zhenya's mother; their trip is punctuated by arguments, and they do not find any clues as to Alyosha's whereabouts. On the return journey home, Zhenya and Boris argue again; Zhenya says her marriage to Boris while pregnant was a mistake and she should have had an abortion; she also says she feels pity for Masha. Enraged, Boris stops the car and forces her out on a rural roadway.

The police again become involved with the search for Alyosha, which covers an increasingly wide area of the town and its surrounding area. After a fruitless search of an abandoned building that Alyosha's friend, Kuznetsov, identified as their hideout, Zhenya and Boris go to a morgue to view the remains of an unidentified child whose description matches Alyosha's. Both parents deny the disfigured child's body is their son's, though the experience proves traumatic and they break down in tears.

Some time passes; Boris and Zhenya's apartment has been sold, and workers dismantle wall hangings and appliances in Alyosha's old room. On the streets, missing-person posters of Alyosha are looking old and faded. In 2015, Boris now lives with Masha and their infant son, whom he treats coldly, while Zhenya has moved in with Anton. Three years after his disappearance, on the wooded path along which Alyosha used to walk home from school, the strip of tape he threw onto the tree remains as a surviving remnant of his existence.

== Cast ==
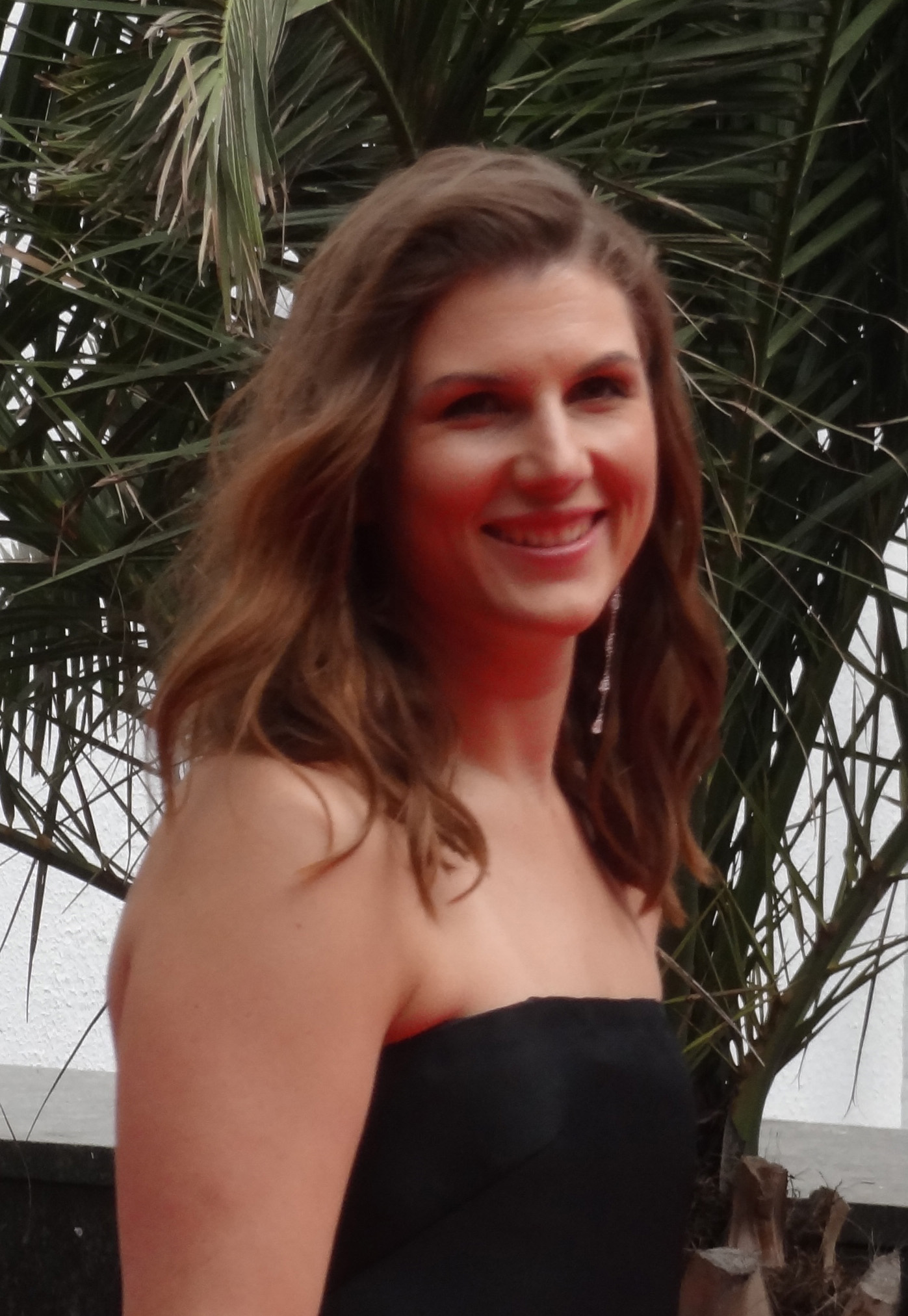
Maryana Spivak won the role of Zhenya after a four-month casting process.

The cast includes:

- Maryana Spivak as Zhenya, Boris’s wife
- Aleksey Rozin as Boris, Zhenya’s husband
- Matvei Novikov as Alyosha, son of Zhenya and Boris
- Alexey Fateev as Ivan, coordinator of search and rescue team
- Marina Vasilyeva as Masha, Boris' lover
- Andris Keišs as Anton, Zhenya's lover
- Natalya Potapova as Zhenya's mother
- Sergey Borisov as the detective

== Themes and interpretations ==
Critic Adam Nayman argued the theme of Loveless is "neglect" and that Alyosha represents "the lost innocence of a society deep in the throes of self-absorption". The Financial Times's Raphael Abraham stated that while Zhenya and Boris are humanized, they are "at best distracted, at worst criminally neglectful". Alyosha may be exemplary of "the unwanted or unacknowledged child" frequently seen in Zvyagintsev's filmography, according to reviewer Anthony Lane. Eric Hynes summarized Boris's and Zhenya's flaws as being "vacuity", "self-regard" and "selfhatred". Film Journal writer Simi Horwitz also said Zhenya is a narcissist "guiding prospective apartment buyers through it as if [Alyosha] were not there". The story is told with "intense domestic detail" compared to the work of Ingmar Bergman and August Strindberg.

In his review, Mark Kermode judged the police as "uncaring and ineffectual", saying this reflects a theme common throughout Zvyagintsev's work, but added the search-and-rescue team offered a contrast; "The volunteers are decent and driven, their stoical mission at odds with the dehumanising cycle of suburban life". Kermode added that Zhenya and Boris only become more resentful after Alyosha goes missing, escalating their "lovelessness", "the state ... in which (we are told) one simply cannot live". Hynes argued Boris and Zhenya do not develop as characters after Alyosha goes missing but are made aware of the "abyss" within themselves. Critic Leslie Felperin said the source of Zhenya's bitterness is revealed in her background when she visits her mother. Zhenya's mother may also live in a state of nelyubov ("lovelessness" in the English translation) according to critic Robert Koehler; the Russian word refers to a state of "anti-love" rather than the absence of love.

The settings and weather also feature in the themes, which according to Horwitz are "rooted in a peculiarly Russian landscape, existential and literal", exemplified by the "bleak, snowy day" that forms the backdrop of the prologue. The wintry forest featured in the prologue conveys the "eerie air of a gothic fairy tale" in Abraham's opinion; the use of the cinematography in the initial scenes may also give the camera "an independence of movement"; Hynes observed it "zooming into the split of a tree, panning skyward from the foot of it". Later in the story, snowfall threatens the search. Horwitz also found the interiors of the residences "oppressive and unwelcoming". Felperin viewed the abandoned building as symbolic, featuring broken glass and an empty pool that "starts to look like a mass grave, but one that could never hold all the runaways of the nation".

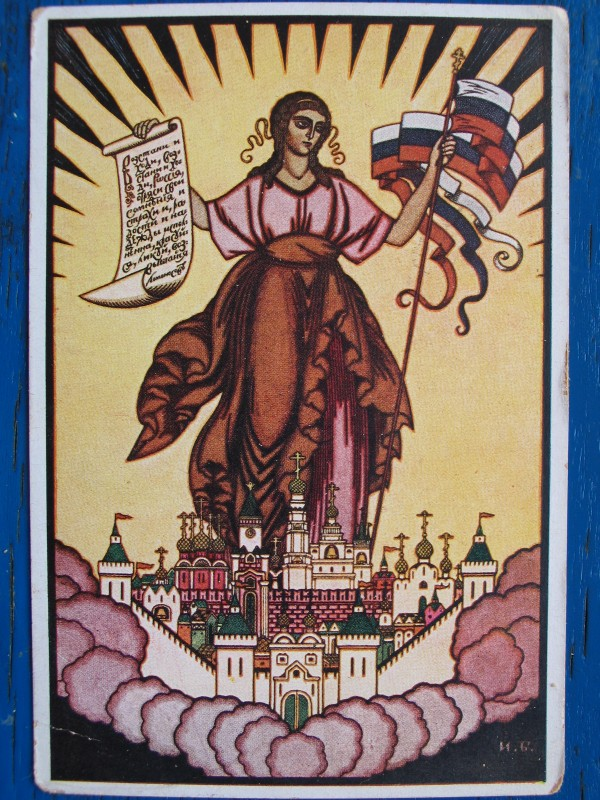
Ivan Bilibin's personification of Russia: There is disagreement over whether Zhenya represents a personification of Russia.

The Economist considered religious and political themes to be less important in Loveless than in Zvyagintsev's 2014 film Leviathan; while Boris' employer is devoutly Russian Orthodox, this is not a predominant theme and "the state is more absent than corrupt". Boris is "terrified" his employer will punish him for the divorce on religious grounds. Koehler equated the ineffectiveness of the police to the Russian state. Robbie Collin argued Loveless has "vast significance", noting that the story opens with Russians fearing the end of the world during the 2012 phenomenon and closes with Zhenya wearing an outfit displaying the word "Russia" prominently while running on a treadmill. Collin interpreted Zhenya as "a real 21st century Mother Russia, going nowhere yet locked unswervingly on course". Zvyagintsev said "Russia" outfits were popular during the 2014 Winter Olympics and was not meant to equate Zhenya with Mother Russia. Koehler instead viewed Zhenya's mother as representative of Mother Russia.

According to Peter Rainer, Loveless is "perhaps [Zvyagintsev's] most encompassing indictment of Russian society", considering the fears of the end of the world lead into the missing person case. Rainer wrote, "Alyosha, with his pugnacious, beseeching face, is not only a lost boy: In the movie's terms, he also represents the loss of something spiritually significant in modern Russia". Koehler interpreted the damaged family as the product of a declining large society. According to Wenlei Ma, "It’s hard not to see Loveless as standing in for Russia’s wider problem—of the promises of Perestroika and Glasnost and the progress reforms brought, progress that has since been diluted by divisions, apathy and a state with no soul". According to Koehler, the film negatively depicts modern Russia in a restaurant scene in which young men and women exchange telephone numbers and take group selfies.

== Production ==
=== Development ===
Producer Alexander Rodnyansky said Loveless was envisioned as a reflection of "Russian life, Russian society and Russian anguish", but was also intended to be relatable to other countries. Rodnyansky also said a desire to look at a family was a starting point in the story's conception, and that the director and screenwriter Andrey Zvyagintsev started writing the story while visiting the United States in 2015. Zvyagintsev said the film began as an attempt to remake Scenes from a Marriage, the 1973 miniseries by Ingmar Bergman. Zvyagintsev claimed to have met Bergman at Fårö in 2003, where they discussed a remake of the miniseries. An unsuccessful attempt to buy the rights to the miniseries led writers Oleg Negin and Zvyagintsev to redraw the plot, deciding to base it on news stories about the search and rescue team Liza Alert. Negin submitted the title Nelyubov to Zvyagintsev, which the director said is a Russian word referring to both a lack of love and a dire spiritual condition. Despite the flawed nature of the lead characters, Zvyagintsev said:

I never perceived them as monsters ... They're just people, like all of us, it’s our reflection, and in some traits of their characters, I even saw myself. These stories come from personal experience and the stories of Oleg Negin, my co-author, and other people.

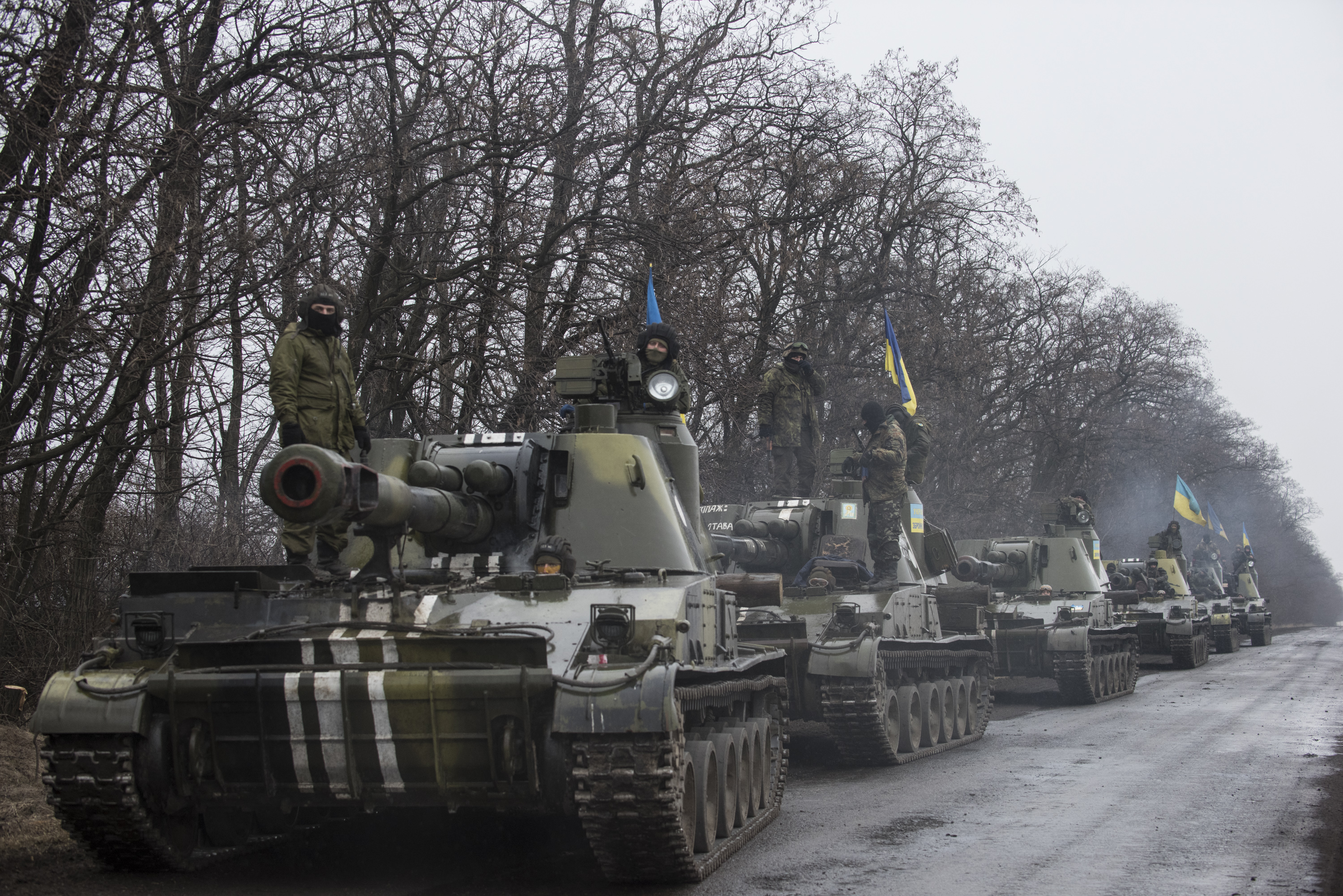
The war in Donbas is referenced in the final scenes.

While Zvyagintsev claimed to be uninterested in politics, his story reflects his belief that "The modern-day police don't care about people". He later said Loveless was "over-politicized". He chose to start the story in October 2012, which he said was a point when the Russian people were optimistic about beneficial political reform, ending in disappointment in 2015. The film also includes references to the war in Donbas. While the conflict is referenced through Russian propaganda, Zvyagintsev said his films are anti-government and that the scenes were intended to show the lives of his characters:

All this propaganda that you hear on the radio in the film is just the real background which we Russians lived in from 2012 to 2015 because the main action takes place during six days in the October of 2012. And, then we see the characters after several years in 2015 when, already, all these tragic events between Russia and Ukraine have happened. They’re just the real background that we experienced in those days.

Zvyagintsev's earlier film Leviathan, about corruption in Russia, received 35% of its budget from Russia's Ministry of Culture. However, Loveless was made without financial support from the national government because the Ministry of Culture disapproved of Leviathan when it was finished. The producers neither requested nor received any offers of state support for Loveless, Zvyagintsev said. Rodnyansky instead appealed for funding from wealthy Russian Gleb Fetisov and foreign companies, including Why Not Productions in France and Les Films du Fleuve in Belgium.

=== Casting ===
Zvyagintsev said it was natural to cast Aleksey Rozin as Boris because he and Rozin had previously worked together twice. (Note: Rozin appeared Zvyagintsev's Elena (2011) and Leviathan (2014).) The crew spent four months casting the character Zhenya, for which Maryana Spivak was an early candidate, and she was eventually cast in the role. Spivak said she took the opportunity for a starring role in a film and the chance to work with Zvyagintsev. Spivak questioned whether her character truly did not love her son; she interpreted the role with ambiguity, considering the complexity of Zhenya's emotions. Zvyagintsev's desire to cast unknown actors led to the casting of Sergey Badichkin as Boris' co-worker.

The filmmakers auditioned 250 children for the role of Alyosha and shortlisted around six. They asked the candidates to portray Alyosha weeping as his parents are arguing; Matvey Novikov was cast as Alyosha and the second-best candidate, Artyom Zhigulin, was given the role of Kuznetsov.

=== Filming ===
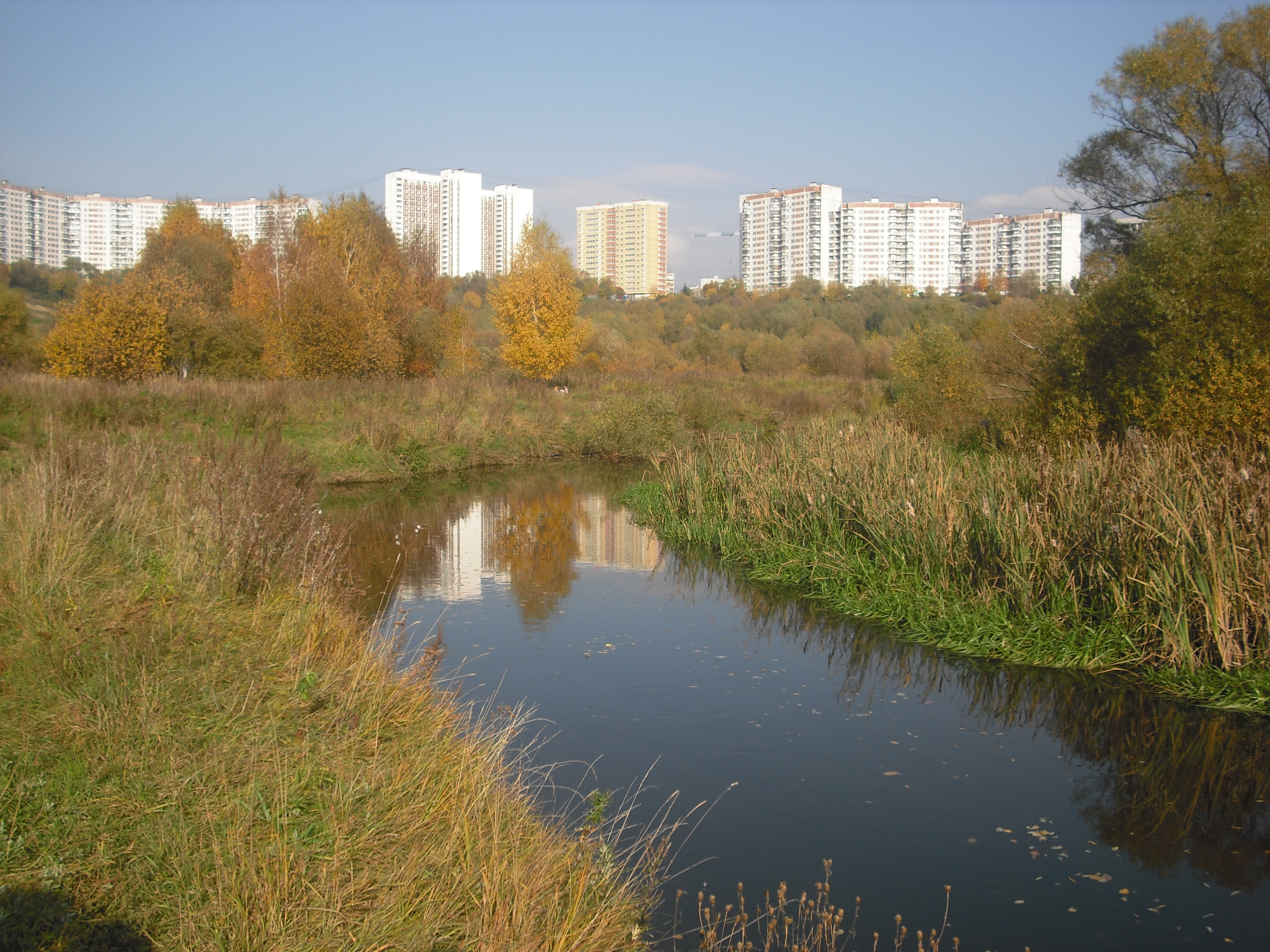
Scenes were shot in Moscow, including at Skhodnya River.

Principal photography began in Summer 2016. Filming was done in Moscow, on location, in apartments and at an unused building that was used to portray the search. The unused building was an abandoned "cultural palace" found by a location scout. Skhodnya River was also used as a location.

Zvyagintsev and his cinematographer Mikhail Krichman used harsh lighting and a color scheme with desaturated grays and browns. Zvyagintsev described his direction:

The direction is towards the particular, the accuracy of the recreation of details: that is what allows anyone who watches to appreciate the sense of the work, though the sincerity, the honesty of its approach to human nature. If you try and tackle abstract problems, problems of society or the world as a whole, you’ll never get anything done. You won’t create anything.

Krichman said he aimed for realism in his filming, for which he used an Arri Alexa digital camera that was kept more stationary than its subjects. On average, the filmmakers filmed twelve takes for each scene, and Krichman said some scenes needed up to twenty-eight takes. The scene in which Matvey Novikov runs down a hallway was filmed using by camera dolly; it took over four hours to film because of difficulties with lighting.

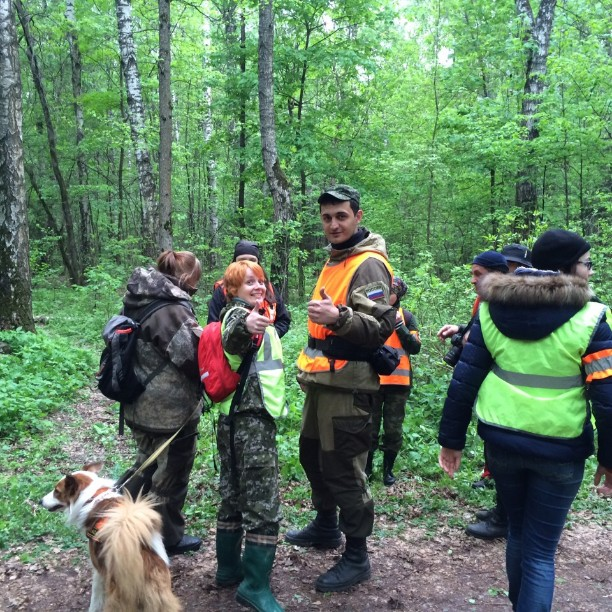
Liza Alert volunteers inspired the story and consulted the production.

During production, members of Russian search-and-rescue group Liza Alert advised the filmmakers and lent their equipment for use on screen. The dead child in the morgue was artificial. The filmmakers used the nude photography of Annie Leibovitz as an influence for the sex scenes. For the opening scene at the school, Zvyagintsev instructed the crew to film the empty yard for one minute before the crew let the child actors leave, instructing them not to look into the camera. For Matvey Novikov's weeping scene, Novikov was not given this part of the screenplay and did not know what his character was overhearing, but Zvyagintsev instructed him; "Imagine you're badly craving something, a toy, a bicycle, and then imagine that you're not gonna get it", filming the scene in eight takes.

=== Post-production ===
The film score was composed by Evgueni and Sacha Galperine, who wrote the music after hearing a synopsis of the story but without seeing the film or reading the screenplay. Evgueni Galperine said the piece "11 Cycles of E" was written as an interpretation of a parent's narrowly focused thoughts about finding a missing child.

The film was still incomplete when it was selected on 13 April 2017 for screening at the Cannes Film Festival the next May, The crew decided to film a final scene for Loveless. Over the next month, editing of the finished version was completed; Zvyagintsev described the lateness of the process as "extreme circumstances".

== Release ==
Loveless competed for the Palme d'Or in the main competition section at the Cannes Film Festival in May 2017. The filmmakers and distributors could not find words for the title, Nelyubov, in English or French, and chose Loveless and Faute d'amour, respectively. Beijing WeYing Technology acquired the Chinese distribution rights, and Altitude Film Distribution purchased the rights to release it in the United Kingdom. It was subsequently selected for screening at the 2017 New Zealand International Film Festival in July and the Sarajevo Film Festival in August. In September, it was screened at the 2017 Toronto International Film Festival.

The film was released In Russia on 1 June 2017, with distributors relying on Cannes to build up interest in the film while seeking theatrical showings before online piracy became widespread. Its French release followed on 20 September 2017. It was released in the UK on 24 January 2018. Sony Pictures Classics acquired the North and Latin American distribution rights, releasing it in New York and Los Angeles in February 2018. On 21 February 2018, it was re-released in Russian theaters.

On 23 January 2018, Pyramide Vidéo released Loveless on DVD in Region 2 as part of a boxset of Zvyagintsev's films. On 12 June 2018, Sony Pictures Home Entertainment released the film in Region 1 on DVD and Blu-ray.

== Reception ==
=== Box office ===
In its first two weeks of screenings in Russia, Loveless grossed 100 million rubles. In France, the film opened on 20 September 2017 and attracted 10,000 admissions. According to Sony, on its first week of release in North America Loveless grossed $30,950, an average of $10,317 per location. In its second and third weeks of its U.S. release, Loveless grossed $65,457, an average of $5,455 per location; and $60,583, an average of $2,423 per location.

In Russia, the film made $2 million by February 2018, with 350,000 admissions. It grossed $4,885,296 worldwide.

=== Critical response ===
As of 20 September 2020, Loveless has an approval rating of 95% on review aggregator website Rotten Tomatoes, based on 183 reviews, and an average rating of 8.30/10. The website's critical consensus states, "Loveless uses its riveting portrait of a family in crisis to offer thought-provoking commentary on modern life in Russia—and the world beyond its borders". It also has a score of 86 out of 100 on Metacritic, based on 33 critics, indicating "universal acclaim".

At Cannes, The Toronto Star's Peter Howell praised Loveless as "masterfully bleak" and endorsed it for the Palme d'Or; he said it was also leading in the critics' polls. On RogerEbert.com, Ben Kenigsberg predicted it would win the Palme d'Or, calling it "austere and beautiful, leisurely yet compelling". For Variety, Owen Gleiberman called the film "compelling and forbidding" and "an ominous, reverberating look" at "the crisis of empathy at the culture’s core" in contemporary Russian society. Peter Bradshaw gave it five stars in The Guardian, praising it as a "stark, mysterious and terrifying story". For Izvestia, Kirill Razlogov commented on the realistic depiction of common life and on Spivak's and Rozin's portrayal of hatred for each other. The Hollywood Reporter's Leslie Felperin praised its intensity, avoidance of a heavy-handed approach to many issues—including in its examination of lack of social bonds within a technological society—and the ways damaging relationships are passed down through family histories. In The Daily Telegraph, Robbie Collin awarded it five stars, hailing it as "pristine and merciless", and compared its opening with the ominous prologue to the 1973 film Don't Look Now. Eric Kohn gave it a B in IndieWire and said it falls short of Leviathan. On Vulture.com, Emily Yoshida called it a "dour" film with unlikable characters and a lack of focus to make a coherent point, and said the positive was that it inspired gratitude in viewers who did not live under Russian President Vladimir Putin's regime.

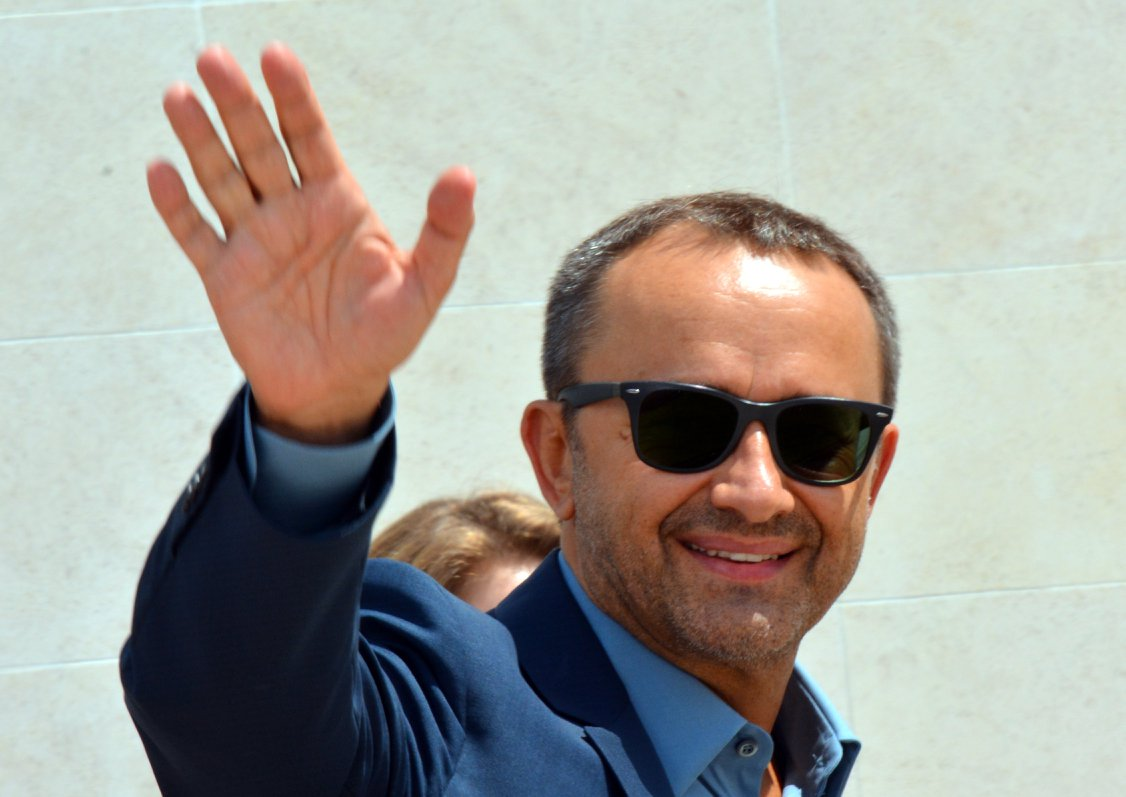
Andrey Zvyagintsev's direction received positive reviews. He won the Asia Pacific Screen Award for Achievement in Directing.

Following Cannes, Russian critic Andrei Plakhov wrote that the film effectively conveys poetry and grief. In France, Jacques Mandelbaum of Le Monde said Zvyagintsev established a dark tone in which the characters fail due to their selfishness and negativity. Le Parisien's Pierre Vavasseur commended the look of the film. For Les Inrockuptibles, Vincent Ostria called Loveless one of Zvyagintsev's best films, commenting on the pathos of the title. In Belgium, Le Soir's Fabienne Bradfer hailed Zvyagintsev as a master and Loveless as lucid and intimate. In the German newspaper Der Spiegel, Carolin Weidner focused on the selfish nature of the parent characters and their lack of awareness of their son's disappearance, and interpreted it as a parable of Russia wrapped up in the 2012 phenomenon. In Der Tagesspiegel, Andreas Busche said the dialogue regarding the 2012 apocalyptic fears leads into a colder period for Russia and regarded Loveless as nihilist.

Some critics compared the Loveless to its inspiration, Bergman's Scenes from a Marriage. Los Angeles Times critic Justin Chang called the film "a withering snapshot of contemporary Russian malaise". For The New York Times, Jeannette Catsoulis commented on the atmosphere and suspenseful cinematography. Mike D'Angelo wrote in The A.V. Club that with news stories about alleged Russian government's hacking following the 2016 U.S. presidential election, Loveless showed civilians in Russia are also unhappy under its government. Anthony Lane, in a positive review for The New Yorker, noted the bleakness of the film's story line but found it "so much more gripping than grim". Critic David Ehrlich named Evgueni and Sacha Galperine's score as the ninth-best cinematic soundtrack of 2017, particularly praising "11 Cycles of E" as "striking".

=== Accolades ===
The jury at Cannes awarded Loveless the Jury Prize. Producer Alexander Rodnyansky said that when the Russian Oscar Committee was selecting a submission for the Academy Award for Best Foreign Language Film, Loveless's political critics campaigned against it but it remained a frontrunner due to the Jury Prize and the positive reception in North America. Critic Anton Dolin argued Loveless's Sony distribution and Zvyagintsev's previous nomination for Leviathan also gave it an edge over other Russian films considered. In September, it was selected as the Russian entry for Best Foreign Language Film at the 90th Academy Awards; the Academy shortlisted it for a nomination in December.

Award	Date of ceremony	Category	Recipient(s)	Result	Ref(s)
Academy Awards	4 March 2018	Best Foreign Language Film	Andrey Zvyagintsev	Nominated	
Asia Pacific Screen Awards	23 November 2017	Best Director	Andrey Zvyagintsev	Won	
Belgian Film Critics Association	7 January 2018	Grand Prix	Andrey Zvyagintsev	Won	
British Academy Film Awards	18 February 2018	Best Film Not in the English Language	Andrey Zvyagintsev	Nominated	
British Independent Film Awards	10 December 2017	Best Foreign Independent Film	Andrey Zvyagintsev	Nominated	
Camerimage	11—18 November 2017	Silver Frog	Mikhail Krichman	Won	
Camerimage	11—18 November 2017	Golden Frog	Mikhail Krichman	Nominated	
Cannes Film Festival	17—28 May 2017	Jury Prize	Andrey Zvyagintsev	Won	
Cannes Film Festival	17—28 May 2017	Palme d'Or	Andrey Zvyagintsev	Nominated	
César Awards	2 March 2018	Best Foreign Film	Andrey Zvyagintsev	Won	
Chicago Film Critics Association	12 December 2017	Best Foreign Language Film	Andrey Zvyagintsev	Nominated	
Dublin Film Critics' Circle	20 December 2018	Best Film		5th Place (Note: Shared with A Quiet Place.)	
European Film Awards	9 December 2017	Best Film	Andrey Zvyagintsev	Nominated	
European Film Awards	9 December 2017	Best Director	Andrey Zvyagintsev	Nominated	
European Film Awards	9 December 2017	Best Screenwriter	Oleg Negin, Andrey Zvyagintsev	Nominated	
European Film Awards	9 December 2017	Best Cinematographer	Mikhail Krichman	Won	
European Film Awards	9 December 2017	Best Composer	Evgueni and Sacha Galperine	Won	
European Film Awards	9 December 2017	University Award	Andrey Zvyagintsev	Nominated	
Golden Eagle Awards	26 January 2018	Best Feature Film	Andrey Zvyagintsev	Nominated	
Golden Eagle Awards	26 January 2018	Best Director	Andrey Zvyagintsev	Won	
Golden Eagle Awards	26 January 2018	Best Screenwriter	Oleg Negin, Andrey Zvyagintsev	Nominated	
Golden Eagle Awards	26 January 2018	Best Cinematography	Mikhail Krichman	Nominated	
Golden Eagle Awards	26 January 2018	Best Music Score	Evgueni and Sacha Galperine	Nominated	
Golden Globes	7 January 2018	Best Foreign Language Film	Andrey Zvyagintsev	Nominated	
Independent Spirit Awards	3 March 2018	Best International Film	Andrey Zvyagintsev	Nominated	
International Adana Film Festival	30 September 2017	Best International Film	Andrey Zvyagintsev	Won	
London Film Critics' Circle	28 January 2018	Foreign Language Film of the Year	Andrey Zvyagintsev	Nominated	
London Film Critics' Circle	28 January 2018	Film of the Year	Andrey Zvyagintsev	Nominated	
London Film Festival	4—15 October 2017	Best Film	Andrey Zvyagintsev	Won	
Los Angeles Film Critics Association	3 December 2017	Best Foreign Language Film	Andrey Zvyagintsev	Won (Note: Shared with BPM (Beats Per Minute) by Robin Campillo.)	
Magritte Awards	3 February 2018	Best Foreign Film in Coproduction	Andrey Zvyagintsev	Nominated	
Munich International Film Festival	22 June—1 July 2017	Best International Film	Andrey Zvyagintsev	Won	
National Board of Review	28 November 2017	Top Five Foreign Language Films	Andrey Zvyagintsev	Won	
Nika Awards	1 April 2018	Best Film	Alexander Rodnyansky, Andrey Zvyagintsev	Nominated	
Nika Awards	1 April 2018	Best Director	Andrey Zvyagintsev	Nominated	
Nika Awards	1 April 2018	Best Screenplay	Oleg Negin, Andrey Zvyagintsev	Nominated	
Nika Awards	1 April 2018	Best Sound	Andrey Dergachev	Nominated	
Nika Awards	1 April 2018	Best Cinematographer	Mikhail Krichman	Nominated	
Nika Awards	1 April 2018	Best Composer	Evgueni and Sacha Galperine	Nominated	
Russian Guild of Film Critics	21 December 2017	Best Film	Alexander Rodnyansky, Andrey Zvyagintsev	Nominated	
Russian Guild of Film Critics	21 December 2017	Best Director	Andrey Zvyagintsev	Won	
Russian Guild of Film Critics	21 December 2017	Best Screenplay	Oleg Negin, Andrey Zvyagintsev	Nominated	
Russian Guild of Film Critics	21 December 2017	Best Actress	Maryana Spivak	Nominated	
Russian Guild of Film Critics	21 December 2017	Best Cinematographer	Mikhail Krichman	Won	
Russian Guild of Film Critics	21 December 2017	Best Composer	Evgueni Galperine	Nominated	
Satellite Awards	10 February 2018	Best Foreign Language Film	Andrey Zvyagintsev	Nominated	
Toronto Film Critics Association	10 December 2017	Best Foreign Language Film	Andrey Zvyagintsev	Runner-up	
Zagreb Film Festival	11—20 November 2017	Together Again Best Film	Andrey Zvyagintsev	Won	

== See also ==
- List of submissions to the 90th Academy Awards for Best Foreign Language Film
- List of Russian submissions for the Academy Award for Best International Feature Film
