= Skhodnya (disambiguation) =

Skhodnya is an urban district in Russia.

Skhodnya may also refer to:

- Skhodnya (river), river in Russia
- Skhodnya (railway station) on the Saint Petersburg–Moscow railway
