= Aleksey Rozin =

Russian film and stage actor (born 1978)

- Алексей Розин
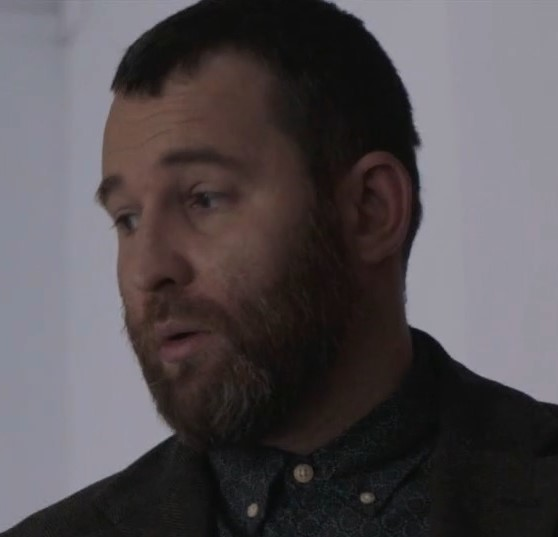
- Rozin on the set of the short film Sign (2017)
- Born: Aleksey Anatolievich Rozin; 4 February 1978 (age 48); Dushanbe, TaSSR, USSR
- Citizenship: Russian
- Education: Moscow Art Theatre School
- Occupation: Actor
- Years active: 1998–present

Aleksey Anatolievich Rozin (Russian: Алексей Анатольевич Розин; born 4 February 1978) is a Russian film and stage actor.

== Biography ==
Rozin studied at the Moscow Art Theatre School. He has acted on stage with productions such as Story of the Story.

In film he appeared in director Andrey Zvyagintsev's Elena (2011) and Leviathan (2014), before taking the lead role in Loveless, which went to the 2017 Cannes Film Festival. Zvyagintsev said it was natural to cast Rozin as the character Boris as they worked together twice before.

== Filmography ==
| Year | Title | Role | Notes |
|---|---|---|---|
| 2005 | Greenhouse Effect | airport security guard | |
| 2009 | Wolfy | second policeman | |
| 2011 | Elena | Sergey | |
| 2011 | Bullet Collector | stepfather | |
| 2012 | Until the Night Part | restaurant visitor | |
| 2014 | Leviathan | Pavel Polivanov, sergeant of the DPS | |
| 2017 | Loveless | Boris Sleptsov | |
| 2018 | Let It Be Liza | Artur | |
| 2019 | Sky Measured In Miles | Kotikov | |
| 2020 | Baba Yaga: Terror of the Dark Forest | Alexey | |
| 2020 | UFO | Robert Evans | |
| 2021 | Heart of Parma | Pitirim | |
| 2021 | Survivors | Rotny | TV series |
| 2022 | Monastery | Vitya's father | TV series |
| 2023 | Matthew Passion | Matthew's father | |
| 2023 | Frau | Grisha | |
| 2024 | The Master and Margarita | Azazello | |
