= European Film Award for Best Screenwriter =

Annual award given for cinematic achievements in screenwriting

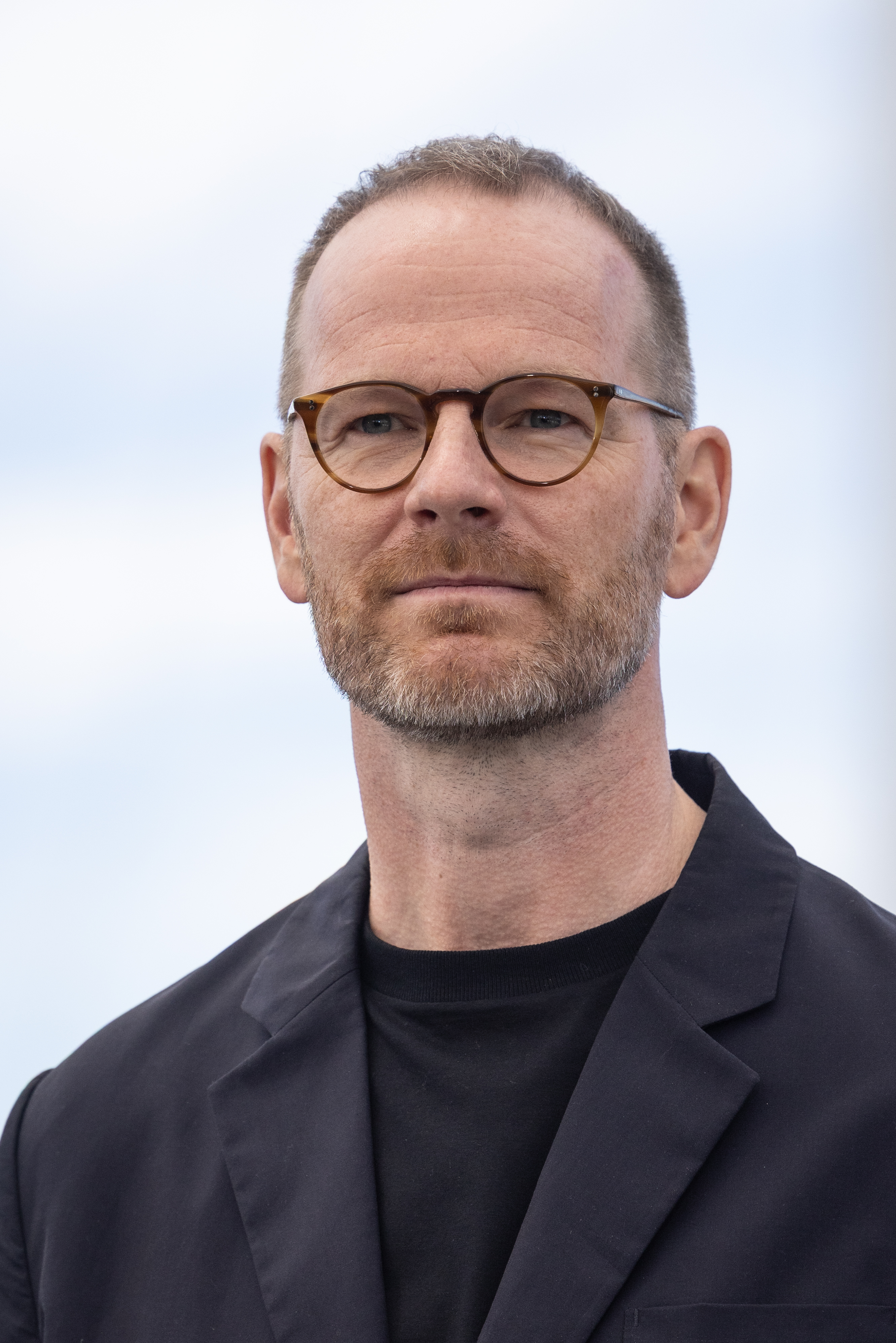
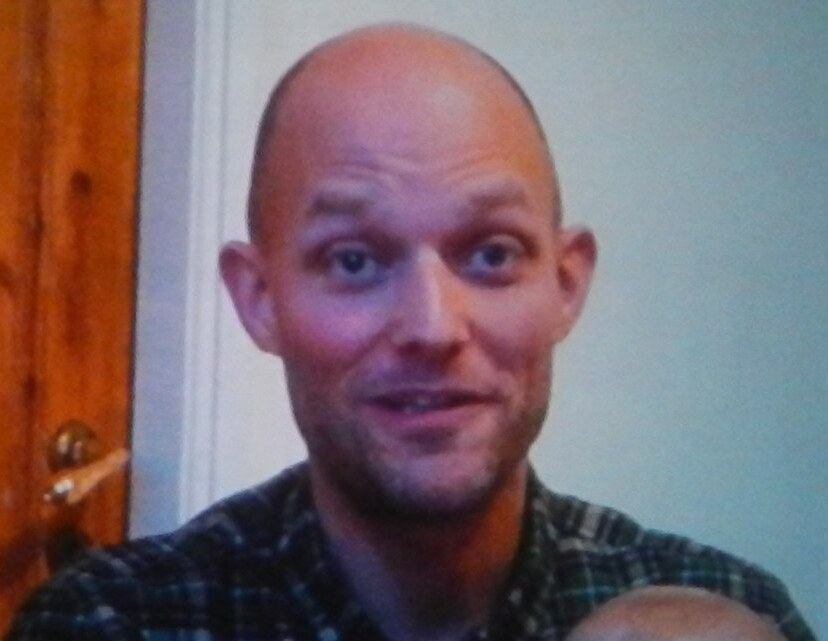
- The 2025 recipients: Joachim Trier and Eskil Vogt
- Awarded for: Best Achievement in Screenwriting
- Presented by: European Film Academy
- First award: Louis Malle; Au revoir les enfants (1988)
- Currently held by: Joachim Trier and Eskil Vogt; Sentimental Value (2025)
- Website: europeanfilmacademy.org

The European Film Award for Best Screenwriter is an award given out at the annual European Film Awards to recognize a screenwriter who has delivered an outstanding screenplay in a film industry. The award is presented by the European Film Academy (EFA) and was first presented in 1988 to French director and screenwriter Louis Malle for Goodbye Children.

István Szabó, Agnès Jaoui, Jean-Pierre Bacri, Thomas Vinterberg, Tobias Lindholm, Ruben Östlund and Paweł Pawlikowski are the only writers who have received this award more than once, with two wins each.

== Winners and nominees ==
=== 1980s ===
Year	Winner and nominees	English title	Original title
1988 (1st)	Louis Malle	Goodbye Children	Au Revoir Les Enfants
1988 (1st)	Manoel de Oliveira	The Cannibals	Os Canibais
1988 (1st)	Terence Davies	Distant Voices, Still Lives	
1988 (1st)	Daniele Luchetti, Franco Bernini, and Angelo Pasquini	It's Happening Tomorrow	Domani accadrà
1988 (1st)	Wolfgang Held	Bear Ye One Another's Burden	Einer trage des anderen Last
1989 (2nd)	Mariya Khmelik	Little Vera	Ма́ленькая Ве́ра
1989 (2nd)	Géza Bereményi	Eldorado	Eldorádó
1989 (2nd)	Þráinn Bertelsson	Magnús	
1989 (2nd)	Theodoros Angelopoulos, Tonino Guerra, and Thanassis Valtinos	Landscape in the Mist	Τοπίο στην ομίχλη
1989 (2nd)	Maciej Dejczer and Cezary Harasimowicz	300 Miles to Heaven	300 mil do nieba

=== 1990s ===
Year	Winner and nominees	English title	Original title
1990 (3rd)	Vitali Kanevsky	Freeze Die Come to Life	Замри, умри, воскресни
1990 (3rd)	Ryszard Bugajski and Janusz Dymek	Interrogation	Przesłuchanie
1990 (3rd)	Etienne Glaser, Madeleine Gustafsson, and Suzanne Osten	The Guardian Angel	Skyddsängeln
1991 (4th)	Jaco Van Dormael	Toto the Hero	Toto le Héros
1992 (5th)	István Szabó	Sweet Emma, Dear Böbe	Édes Emma, drága Böbe - vázlatok, aktok
1996 (9th)	Arif Aliev, Sergei Bodrov, and Boris Giller	Prisoner of the Mountains	Кавказский пленник
1997 (10th)	Chris Vander Stappen and Alain Berliner	Ma vie en rose	
1997 (10th)	Ademir Kenović and Abdulah Sidran	The Perfect Circle	Savršeni krug
1997 (10th)	Andrei Kurkov	A Friend of the Deceased	Priyatel pokoynika
1998 (11th)	Peter Howitt	Sliding Doors	
1998 (11th)	Lars von Trier	The Idiots	Idioterne
1998 (11th)	Alex van Warmerdam	Little Tony	Kleine Teun
1998 (11th)	Jean-Pierre Bacri and Agnès Jaoui	Same Old Song	On connaît la chanson
1999 (12th)	István Szabó and Israel Horovitz	Sunshine	
1999 (12th)	Saša Gedeon	The Idiot Returns	Návrat idiota
1999 (12th)	Ayub Khan Din	East is East	

=== 2000s ===
Year	Winner and nominees	English title	Original title
2000 (13th)	Agnès Jaoui and Jean-Pierre Bacri	The Taste of Others	Le goût des autres
2000 (13th)	Rafael Azcona	Butterfly's Tongue	La lengua de las mariposas
2000 (13th)	Wolfgang Kohlhaase	The Legend of Rita	Die Stille nach dem Schuß
2000 (13th)	Nana Djordjadze, Mariya Zvereva, and Irakli Kvirikadze	27 Missing Kisses	27 დაკარგული კოცნა
2000 (13th)	Doriana Leondeff and Silvio Soldini	Bread and Tulips	Pane e tulipani
2000 (13th)	Dominik Moll and Gilles Marchand	Harry, He's Here to Help	Harry, un ami qui vous veut du bien
2001 (14th)	Danis Tanović	No Man's Land	Ničija zemlja
2001 (14th)	Laurent Cantet and Robin Campillo	Time Out	L'Emploi du temps
2001 (14th)	Michael Haneke	The Piano Teacher	La Pianiste
2001 (14th)	Achero Mañas	Pellet	El Bola
2001 (14th)	Jean-Louis Milesi and Robert Guédiguian	The Town Is Quiet	La ville est tranquille
2001 (14th)	Ettore Scola, Silvia Scola, Giacomo Scarpelli, and Furio Scarpelli	Unfair Competition	Concorrenza sleale
2002 (15th)	Pedro Almodóvar	Talk to Her	Hable con ella
2002 (15th)	Jacques Audiard and Tonino Benacquista	Read My Lips	Sur mes lèvres
2002 (15th)	Paul Greengrass	Bloody Sunday	
2002 (15th)	Aki Kaurismäki	The Man Without a Past	Mies vailla menneisyyttä
2002 (15th)	Krzysztof Kieślowski and Krzysztof Piesiewicz	Heaven	
2002 (15th)	Paul Laverty	Sweet Sixteen	
2002 (15th)	François Ozon	8 Women	8 Femmes
2003 (16th)	Bernd Lichtenberg	Good Bye, Lenin!	
2003 (16th)	Lars von Trier	Dogville	
2003 (16th)	Sandro Petraglia and Stefano Rulli	The Best of Youth	La meglio gioventù
2003 (16th)	Hanif Kureishi	The Mother	
2003 (16th)	Dušan Kovačević	The Professional	Професионалац
2003 (16th)	Steven Knight	Dirty Pretty Things	
2004 (17th)	Agnès Jaoui and Jean-Pierre Bacri	Look at Me	Comme une image
2004 (17th)	Paul Laverty	Ae Fond Kiss ...	
2004 (17th)	Jean-Luc Godard	Our Music	Notre musique
2004 (17th)	Pedro Almodóvar	Bad Education	La mala educación
2004 (17th)	Alejandro Amenábar and Mateo Gil	The Sea Inside	Mar adentro
2004 (17th)	Fatih Akin	Head-On	Gegen die Wand / Duvara Karşı
2005 (18th)	Hany Abu-Assad; Bero Beyer	Paradise Now	الجنّة الآن
2005 (18th)	Anders Thomas Jensen	Adam's Apples	Adams Æbler
2005 (18th)	Anders Thomas Jensen	Brothers	Brødre
2005 (18th)	Cristi Puiu and Răzvan Rădulescu	The Death of Mr. Lazarescu	Moartea domnului Lăzărescu
2005 (18th)	Dani Levy and Holger Franke	Go for Zucker!	Alles auf Zucker!
2005 (18th)	Michael Haneke	Hidden	Caché
2005 (18th)	Mark O'Halloran	Adam & Paul	
2006 (19th)	Florian Henckel von Donnersmarck	The Lives of Others	Das Leben der Anderen
2006 (19th)	Pedro Almodóvar	Volver	
2006 (19th)	Paul Laverty	The Wind That Shakes the Barley	
2006 (19th)	Corneliu Porumboiu	12:08 East of Bucharest	A fost sau n-a fost?
2007 (20th)	Fatih Akin	The Edge of Heaven	Auf der anderen Seite
2007 (20th)	Eran Kolirin	The Band's Visit	ביקור התזמורת
2007 (20th)	Peter Morgan	The Queen	
2007 (20th)	Cristian Mungiu	4 Months, 3 Weeks and 2 Days	4 luni, 3 săptămâni și 2 zile
2008 (21st)	Matteo Garrone, Roberto Saviano, Maurizio Braucci, Ugo Chiti, Gianni Di Gregorio, and Massimo Gaudioso	Gomorrah	Gomorra
2008 (21st)	Ari Folman	Waltz with Bashir	ואלס עם באשיר
2008 (21st)	Suha Arraf and Eran Riklis	Lemon Tree	شجرة ليمون / עץ לימון
2008 (21st)	Paolo Sorrentino	Il Divo	
2009 (22nd)	Michael Haneke	The White Ribbon	Das weiße Band
2009 (22nd)	Jacques Audiard and Thomas Bidegain	A Prophet	Un prophète
2009 (22nd)	Simon Beaufoy	Slumdog Millionaire	
2009 (22nd)	Gianni Di Gregorio	Mid-August Lunch	Pranzo di ferragosto

=== 2010s ===
Year	Winner and nominees	English title	Original title
2010 (23rd)	Robert Harris and Roman Polanski	The Ghost Writer	
2010 (23rd)	Jorge Guerricaechevarría and Daniel Monzón	Cell 211	Celda 211
2010 (23rd)	Samuel Maoz	Lebanon	לְבָנוֹן
2010 (23rd)	Radu Mihăileanu	The Concert	Le concert
2011 (24th)	Jean-Pierre and Luc Dardenne	The Kid with a Bike	Le Gamin au vélo
2011 (24th)	Anders Thomas Jensen	In a Better World	Hævnen
2011 (24th)	Aki Kaurismäki	Le Havre	
2011 (24th)	Lars von Trier	Melancholia	
2012 (25th)	Tobias Lindholm and Thomas Vinterberg	The Hunt	Jagten
2012 (25th)	Cristian Mungiu	Beyond the Hills	După dealuri
2012 (25th)	Michael Haneke	Amour	
2012 (25th)	Roman Polanski and Yasmina Reza	Carnage	
2012 (25th)	Éric Toledano and Olivier Nakache	The Intouchables	Intouchables
2013 (26th)	François Ozon	In the House	Dans la maison
2013 (26th)	Paolo Sorrentino and Umberto Contarello	The Great Beauty	La grande bellezza
2013 (26th)	Tom Stoppard	Anna Karenina	
2013 (26th)	Giuseppe Tornatore	The Best Offer	La migliore offerta
2013 (26th)	Felix Van Groeningen and Carl Joos	The Broken Circle Breakdown	
2014 (27th)	Paweł Pawlikowski and Rebecca Lenkiewicz	Ida	
2014 (27th)	Ebru Ceylan and Nuri Bilge Ceylan	Winter Sleep	Kış Uykusu
2014 (27th)	Jean-Pierre and Luc Dardenne	Two Days, One Night	Deux jours, une nuit
2014 (27th)	Steven Knight	Locke	
2014 (27th)	Oleg Negin and Andrey Zvyagintsev	Leviathan	Левиафан
2015 (28th)	Yorgos Lanthimos and Efthimis Filippou	The Lobster	
2015 (28th)	Radu Jude and Florin Lazarescu	Aferim!	
2015 (28th)	Alex Garland	Ex Machina	
2015 (28th)	Andrew Haigh	45 Years	
2015 (28th)	Roy Andersson	A Pigeon Sat on a Branch Reflecting on Existence	En duva satt på en gren och funderade på tillvaron
2015 (28th)	Paolo Sorrentino	Youth	Youth - La giovinezza
2016 (29th)	Maren Ade	Toni Erdmann	
2016 (29th)	Paul Laverty	I, Daniel Blake	
2016 (29th)	Emma Donoghue	Room	
2016 (29th)	Cristian Mungiu	Graduation	Bacalaureat
2016 (29th)	Tomasz Wasilewski	United States of Love	Zjednoczone stany milosci
2017 (30th)	Ruben Östlund	The Square	
2017 (30th)	Ildikó Enyedi	On Body and Soul	Testről és lélekről
2017 (30th)	Yorgos Lanthimos and Efthimis Filippou	The Killing of a Sacred Deer	
2017 (30th)	Oleg Negin and Andrey Zvyagintsev	Loveless	Нелюбовь
2017 (30th)	François Ozon	Frantz	
2018 (31st)	Paweł Pawlikowski	Cold War	Zimna wojna
2018 (31st)	Ali Abbasi, Isabella Eklöf, and John Ajvide Lindqvist	Border	Gräns
2018 (31st)	Matteo Garrone, Ugo Chiti, and Massimo Gaudioso	Dogman	
2018 (31st)	Gustav Möller and Emil Nygaard Albertsen	The Guilty	Den skyldige
2018 (31st)	Alice Rohrwacher	Happy as Lazzaro	Lazzaro felice
2019 (32nd)	Céline Sciamma	Portrait of a Lady on Fire	Portrait de la jeune fille en feu
2019 (32nd)	Pedro Almodóvar	Pain and Glory	Dolor y gloria
2019 (32nd)	Marco Bellocchio, Valia Santella, Ludovica Rampoldi, Francesco Piccolo, and Francesco La Licata	The Traitor	Il traditore
2019 (32nd)	Ladj Ly, Giordano Gederlini, and Alexis Manenti	Les Misérables	
2019 (32nd)	Roman Polanski and Robert Harris	An Officer and a Spy	J'Accuse

=== 2020s ===
Year	Winner and nominees	English title	Original title
2020 (33rd)	Thomas Vinterberg and Tobias Lindholm	Another Round	Druk
2020 (33rd)	Martin Behnke and Burhan Qurbani	Berlin Alexanderplatz	
2020 (33rd)	Costa-Gavras	Adults in the Room	Ενήλικοι στην αίθουσα
2020 (33rd)	Damiano and Fabio D'Innocenzo	Bad Tales	Favolacce
2020 (33rd)	Pietro Marcello and Maurizio Braucci	Martin Eden	
2020 (33rd)	Mateusz Pacewicz	Corpus Christi	Boże Ciało
2021 (34th)	Florian Zeller and Christopher Hampton	The Father	
2021 (34th)	Radu Jude	Bad Luck Banging or Loony Porn	Babardeală cu bucluc sau porno balamuc
2021 (34th)	Paolo Sorrentino	The Hand of God	È stata la mano di Dio
2021 (34th)	Jasmila Žbanić	Quo Vadis, Aida?	
2021 (34th)	Joachim Trier and Eskil Vogt	The Worst Person in the World	Verdens verste menneske
2022 (35th)	Ruben Östlund	Triangle of Sadness	
2022 (35th)	Arnau Vilaró and Carla Simón	Alcarràs	
2022 (35th)	Kenneth Branagh	Belfast	
2022 (35th)	Lukas Dhont and Angelo Tijssens	Close	
2022 (35th)	Ali Abbasi and Afshin Kamran Bahrami	Holy Spider	عنکبوت مقدس
2023 (36th)	Arthur Harari and Justine Triet	Anatomy of a Fall	Anatomie d'une chute
2023 (36th)	Aki Kaurismäki	Fallen Leaves	Kuolleet lehdet
2023 (36th)	Agnieszka Holland, Gabriela Łazarkiewicz-Sieczko, and Maciej Pisuk	Green Border	Zielona granica
2023 (36th)	İlker Çatak and Johannes Duncker	The Teachers' Lounge	Das Lehrerzimmer
2023 (36th)	Jonathan Glazer	The Zone of Interest	
2024 (37th)	Jacques Audiard	Emilia Pérez	
2024 (37th)	Magnus von Horn and Line Langebek	The Girl with the Needle	Pigen med nålen
2024 (37th)	Pedro Almodóvar	The Room Next Door	La habitación de al lado
2024 (37th)	Mohammad Rasoulof	The Seed of the Sacred Fig	دانه‌ی انجیر معابد
2024 (37th)	Coralie Fargeat	The Substance	
2025 (38th)	Eskil Vogt and Joachim Trier	Sentimental Value	Affeksjonsverdi
2025 (38th)	Santiago Fillol and Oliver Laxe	Sirāt	
2025 (38th)	Jafar Panahi	It Was Just an Accident	یک تصادف ساده
2025 (38th)	Mascha Schilinski and Louise Peter	Sound of Falling	In die Sonne schauen
2025 (38th)	Paolo Sorrentino	La grazia	
2026 (39th)	Javier Calvo, Javier Ambrossi, and Alberto Conejero	La bola negra	
2026 (39th)	Cristian Mungiu	Fjord	
2026 (39th)	Paweł Pawlikowski and Hendrik Handloegten	Fatherland	
2026 (39th)	Sandra Wollner	Everytime	
2026 (39th)	Simon Lyashenko and Andrey Zvyagintsev	Minotaur	Минотавр

== Most wins by screenwriter ==
Screenwriter	Awards	Nominations
Jean-Pierre Bacri	2	3
Agnès Jaoui	2	3
Paweł Pawlikowski	2	2
István Szabó	2	2
Ruben Östlund	2	2
Tobias Lindholm	2	2
Thomas Vinterberg	2	2
Pedro Almodóvar	1	5
Michael Haneke	1	4
Jacques Audiard	1	3
François Ozon	1	3
Dardenne brothers	1	2
Roman Polanski	1	2
Fatih Akin	1	2
Ugo Chiti	1	2
Efthimis Filippou	1	2
Matteo Garrone	1	2
Massimo Gaudioso	1	2
Yorgos Lanthimos	1	2
Joachim Trier	1	2
Eskil Vogt	1	2
Paolo Sorrentino	0	5
Paul Laverty	0	4
Anders Thomas Jensen	0	3
Aki Kaurismäki	0	3
Cristian Mungiu	0	3
Lars von Trier	0	3
Ali Abbasi	0	2
Maurizio Braucci	0	2
Gianni Di Gregorio	0	2
Robert Harris	0	2
Radu Jude	0	2
Steven Knight	0	2
Oleg Negin	0	2
Andrey Zvyagintsev	0	2
