= Skhodnya =

District in Khimki, Russia

Coordinates: 55°57′N 37°18′E

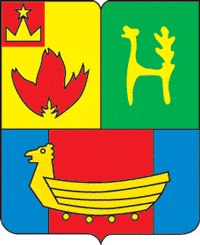
Coat of arms of Shkhodnya

Skhodnya (Russian: Сходня) is a district in Khimki, Moscow Oblast, Russia, located on the Skhodnya River some 12 km northwest of Moscow.

Skhodnya was founded in 1874, granted town status in 1961, and merged into the city of Khimki in 2004. Skhodnya's population was recorded at 19,119 inhabitants as of the 2002 Census; down from 20,366 recorded in the 1989 Census.

In 1974, a former manor house in Skhodnya was the site of a camp training Fatah and Popular Front for the Liberation of Palestine militants in the use of small arms, explosives, military tactics, and ideology.
