= Oleg Negin =

Russian screenwriter (born 1970)

- Born: 2 July 1970 (age 56); Moscow, Soviet Union
- Occupations: Screenwriter; Novelist
- Awards: Cannes Film Festival Best Screenplay Award

Oleg Negin (born 2 July 1970) is a Russian screenwriter and novelist. He was born in Moscow.

Negin's novels include П.Ушкин and Кипарис во дворе, published in 2004. In film, he became a collaborator with director Andrey Zvyagintsev, and at the 2014 Cannes Film Festival their Leviathan won the Best Screenplay Award. For their 2017 film Loveless, Negin and Zvyagintsev were jointly nominated for the European Film Award for Best Screenwriter.

== Filmography ==
Negin's films include:

- The Banishment (2007)
- Elena (2011)
- Leviathan (2014)
- Loveless (2017)
