= Let It Be Liza =

- Theatrical release poster
- Directed by: Igor Kagramanov
- Written by: Igor Kagramanov; Yuri Glushenkov
- Produced by: Dmitry Davidenko; Rafael Minasbekyan; Roman Stolyarsky; Vadim Vereshchagin
- Starring: Yelena Makhova; Natalia Pavlenkova; Aleksey Rozin
- Cinematography: Ivan Ustinov
- Edited by: Igor Kagramanov; Vladimir Krug
- Music by: Oleg Litvishko
- Production company: MetronomeFilm
- Release date: 2018
- Running time: 85 min.
- Country: Russia
- Language: Russian

Let It Be Liza (Russian: Пусть будет Лиза, romanized: Pust budet Liza) is a 2018 Russian drama film directed by Igor Kagramanov based on a script by Kagramanov himself and Yuri Glushenkov.

== Plot ==
Katya lives very modestly, with her husband and mother in a provincial town, and works at a local enterprise. Her mother Galina Stepanovna unexpectedly falls ill, but her act is even more unexpected she decides to sign all her meager inheritance not to her daughter, but to her son, the girl's brother. Katya is ready to do anything to change this unfair, in her opinion, decision. But she herself does not notice how terrible the consequences of her rash actions can be.

== Cast ==
- Yelena Makhova as Katya
- Natalia Pavlenkova as Galina Stepanovna
- Aleksey Rozin as Arthur
- Viktor Potapeshkin as Egor
- Irina Zheryakova as Varvara
- Sonya Rivkin as Alina
- Tatiana Selivyorstova as Tanya
- Leonid Klyots as episode

== Production ==
Filming took place in Kaluga in April 2017.

== Awards and nominations ==
Prizes for the Best Actress (Makhova) and Best Cinematographer (Ustinov) of the XII Cheboksary International Film Festival. Nominated for Best Kinotavr Debut 2018 (Kagramanov).
