= Liza Alert =

Russian-based search-and-rescue volunteer organization

LizaAlert
- ЛизаАлерт
- Emblem of the LizaAlert search-and-rescue team
- Formation: October 14, 2010; 16 years ago
- Founder: Grigory Sergeev
- Founded at: Orekhovo-Zuyevo, Moscow Oblast, Russia
- Type: Search-and-rescue volunteer organization
- Headquarters: Moscow, Russia
- Official language: Russian
- Chairman: Grigory Sergeev
- Volunteers: varies
- Website: lizaalert.org

LizaAlert (Russian: ЛизаАлерт) is a nonprofit search-and-rescue volunteer organization to search for missing people. It is also known as the LizaAlert search-and-rescue team.

LizaAlert takes its name from 5-year-old Liza Fomkina. In 2010 Liza died of hypothermia in the Russian wilderness after a 9-day unsuccessful search mission. The community was born less than 21 days after Liza's death.

== Activities ==
LizaAlert is more than a 24/7 response alert system. It not only carries out the functions of Amber alert in the former USSR, but also directs volunteer forces on active searches for all missing people.

The community isn't directly related to the law enforcement agencies of the Russian Federation. The main part of the search takes place in the former USSR region and surrounding areas. Priority is given to the search for children and the elderly, and people lost in the natural environment. The community does not provide paid search services; searches are free of charge and always executed by volunteers.

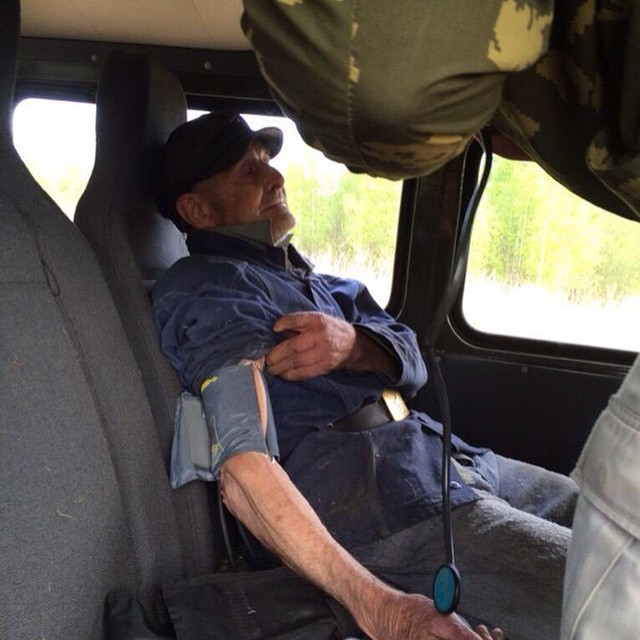
LizaAlert: A missing person found and receiving first aid

Since 2010 LizaAlert has continually been taking part in searches for missing persons in Russia, famous or not. One of the most resonant events was the search of mathematician and University of London professor Alexey Chervonenkis.

Philip N. Howard, Director of the Center for Media, Data and Society in the School of Public Policy at Central European University, writes about LizaAlert as a form of civic project, which stands parallel with Russian Government.

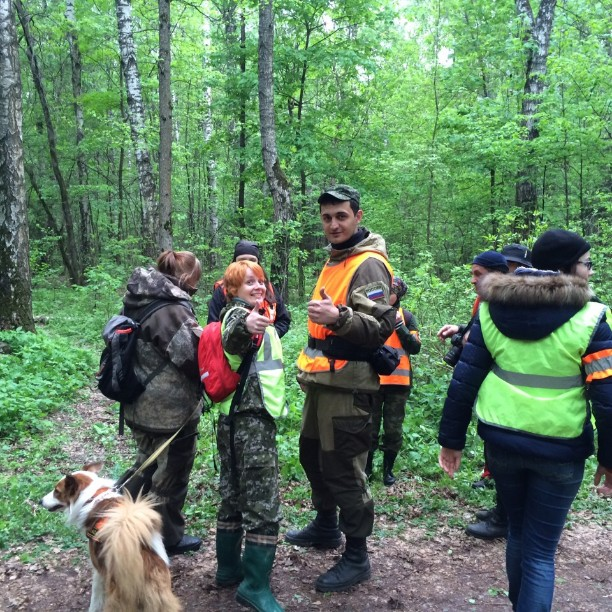
LizaAlert volunteers on a search-and-rescue mission

In 2013, LizaAlert demanded apologies from State Duma deputy Olga Yepifanova, who accused the voluntary movement of being interfering and unorganized.
