= Elena (2011 film) =

2011 film

- Festival poster
- Russian: Елена
- Directed by: Andrey Zvyagintsev
- Written by: Oleg Negin; Andrey Zvyagintsev
- Produced by: Alexander Rodnyansky, Sergey Melkumov
- Starring: Nadezhda Markina; Elena Lyadova
- Cinematography: Mikhail Krichman
- Edited by: Anna Mass
- Music by: Philip Glass
- Distributed by: Zeitgeist Films
- Release dates: 21 May 2011 (Cannes); 29 September 2011 (Russia)
- Running time: 109 minutes
- Country: Russia
- Language: Russian
- Box office: $2.2 million

Elena (Russian: Елена) is a 2011 Russian crime drama film directed by Andrey Zvyagintsev. It premiered in the Un Certain Regard section at the 2011 Cannes Film Festival where it won the Special Jury Prize.

== Plot ==
The film depicts the social and cultural distance between the inhabitants of an exclusive apartment in downtown Moscow and a crumbling khrushchevka in Moscow's industrial suburb. Elena is a woman with a proletarian background who meets Vladimir, an elderly business tycoon, in a hospital when she is his nurse. This meeting eventually results in their marriage. Her social position and social rank are substantially increased by the marriage to such a wealthy man.

Elena's son from a previous marriage is poor and wants money from Vladimir to send his 17-year-old son to university, keeping him out of the compulsory military service. Her son and his family live in a crumbling apartment in the industrial suburb. After being approached by Elena, Vladimir makes it clear that he is not going to subsidize Elena's relatives, and informs her that he plans to make amendments to his will, leaving his wealth to his only daughter from an earlier marriage, with some residual monthly payments to be made to Elena. Elena is terrified by the prospects of such a new will and decides to murder him by switching his own medicines with Viagra, which is extremely dangerous in his post heart attack state. When he dies in bed, she then destroys the handwritten version of the new will which he had not yet been able to formalize with his attorney. Following the destruction of these handwritten notes, she then calls officials to find the body, claiming that she has no idea how and why he died.

The death is found upon medical examination to have been caused by the foolish abuse of medications by Vladimir himself, and the actions of Elena as the culprit are completely overlooked. In the absence of a formal will, he dies intestate and Elena inherits half his estate with the other half going to his only daughter. Elena then takes a substantial amount of money to her son in order to pay for her grandson's education. She is thanked and receives the unexpected news that her son's wife is expecting another child. With Elena keeping her part in Vladimir's death a complete secret from her son, her son then gets his wife to open the liquor cabinet in order for the family to toast their announcement of his wife's pregnancy and the future college career of Elena's grandson. Elena's family then decide to move from their decrepit apartment to Vladimir's wealthy home where Elena became the sole occupant after Vladimir's death, in order to start a new life together with Elena.

== Cast ==
- Nadezhda Markina as Elena
- Andrey Smirnov as Vladimir
- Elena Lyadova as Katya, Vladimir's daughter
- Aleksey Rozin as Sergey, Elena's son
- Evgeniya Konushkina as Tatyana, Sergey's wife
- Igor Ogurtsov as Sasha, Sergey's son
- Vasiliy Michkov as lawyer

== Reception ==
=== Critical response ===
As of 20 September 2020, Elena has an approval rating of 94% on review aggregator website Rotten Tomatoes, based on 65 reviews, and an average rating of 7.80/10. It also has a score of 87 out of 100 on Metacritic, based on 16 critics, indicating "universal acclaim".

Jim Hoberman referred to Elena as "the most vivid evocation... of Moscow’s contemporary society". According to Hoberman, "Zvyagintsev has mapped out a world ruled by ingratitude and the absence of justice". Critic Stephen Holden of The New York Times was impressed by Zvyagintsev's "vision of Moscow as a jungle teeming with predatory wildlife" suggesting that "in this quasi-feudal social environment, avarice and blood ties trump all other values". The Village Voice acclaimed Zvyagintsev's "scalpel-like precision dissecting class that recalls Claude Chabrol". "Shoot this film in black and white and cast Barbara Stanwyck as Elena, and you'd have a 1940s classic", Roger Ebert observes. The relationship between the married couple and their alliance has been described by one critic as "a morganatic marriage nearly a century after the October Revolution".

In 2015, Zeitgeist Films formed a joint venture with Syncopy Inc., Christopher Nolan and Emma Thomas’ production company, to release Blu-ray editions of Zeitgeist's prestige titles. Elena was their first title. Zvyagintsev said of the venture, "As a long-time admirer of Christopher Nolan, I am honored that he is initiating his partnership with Zeitgeist with my film. I wish all the parties involved success."

In 2019 Rolling Stone critics' poll, Elena was ranked the 42nd-greatest film of the 21st century.

=== Awards and nominations ===
- Special Jury Prize of the Un Certain Regard section at the Cannes Film Festival
- Golden Eagle Award for Best Film
- Nika Award for Best Actress
- 2011 Russian Guild of Film Critics Awards – Best Film, Best Director (Andrey Zvyagintsev), Best Female Supporting Actor (Elena Lyadova).
- Nadezhda Markina won the IFFI Best Actor Award (Female): Silver Peacock Award at the 42nd International Film Festival of India.
- Nadezhda Markina was also nominated for the Best Actress at the European Film Awards
- Nadezhda Markina won Best Performance by an Actress at the Asia Pacific Screen Awards.
- Grand Prix at the 2011 edition of Film Fest Gent.
