= Leviathan (2014 film) =

Russian crime drama film

- Theatrical release poster
- Directed by: Andrey Zvyagintsev
- Written by: Andrey Zvyagintsev; Oleg Negin
- Produced by: Alexander Rodnyansky; Sergey Melkumov
- Starring: Aleksei Serebryakov; Elena Lyadova; Vladimir Vdovichenkov; Roman Madyanov; Anna Ukolova; Aleksey Rozin; Sergey Pokhodaev; Valery Grishko; Sergey Bachursky; Platon Kamenev
- Cinematography: Mikhail Krichman
- Edited by: Anna Mass
- Music by: Andrey Dergachev, Philip Glass
- Production companies: Non-Stop Production; Russian Ministry of Culture Cinema Fund; RuArts Foundation
- Distributed by: 20th Century Fox
- Release dates: 23 May 2014 (Cannes); 5 February 2015 (Russia)
- Running time: 141 minutes
- Country: Russia
- Language: Russian
- Budget: 220 million RUB (US$7 million)
- Box office: $3.4 million

Leviathan (Russian: Левиафан, Leviafan) is a 2014 Russian crime drama film directed by Andrey Zvyagintsev, co-written by Zvyagintsev and Oleg Negin, and starring Aleksei Serebryakov, Elena Lyadova, Vladimir Vdovichenkov, and Roman Madyanov.

According to Zvyagintsev, the story of Marvin Heemeyer's 2004 rampage through a small US town using a modified bulldozer inspired him. A similar concept was adapted into a Russian setting. However, after several rewrites of the script, few overt similarities to that story remained in the final version. The character development of the protagonist parallels that of the biblical figure Job and the story of Naboth's Vineyard. The producer Alexander Rodnyansky has said: "It deals with some of the most important social issues of contemporary Russia while never becoming an artist's sermon or a public statement; it is a story of love and tragedy experienced by ordinary people". Critics noted the film as being formidable, dealing with quirks of fate, power and money.

The film was selected to compete for the Palme d'Or in the main competition section at the 2014 Cannes Film Festival. Zvyagintsev and Negin won the award for Best Screenplay. The film was judged the best film of the year at the 2014 BFI London Film Festival and the 45th International Film Festival of India. It won the Best Foreign Language Film award at the 72nd Golden Globe Awards. and the Asia Pacific Screen Award for Best Feature Film in 2014. It was also nominated for an Academy Award for Best Foreign Language Film at the 87th Academy Awards.

== Plot summary ==
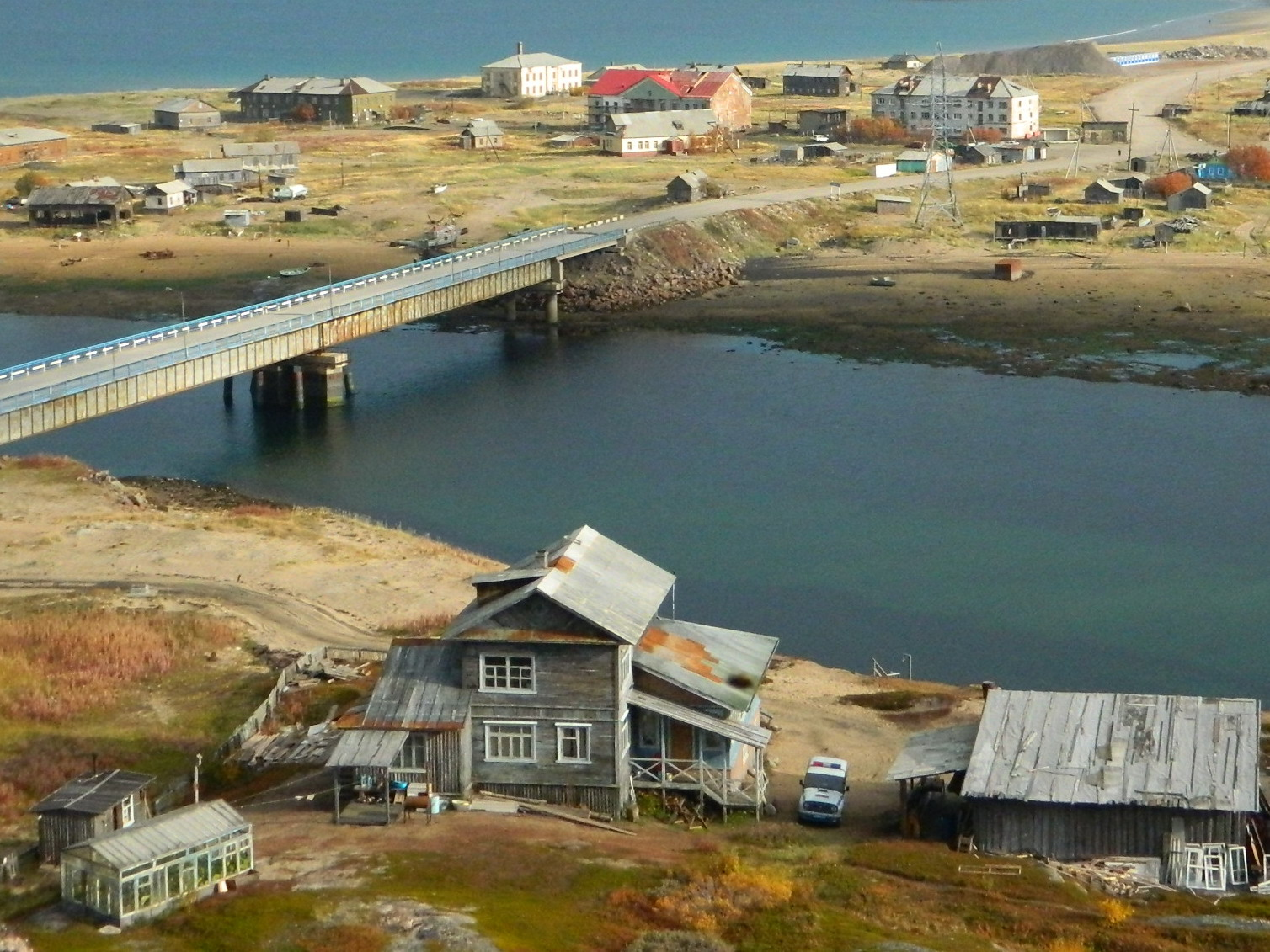
House of Kolya (69.163053°N 35.129944°E)

In the northern Russian coastal town of Pribrezhny live Nikolay Sergeyev, a hotheaded car mechanic; his second wife, Lilya; and his teenage son, Romka. The town's corrupt Mayor Vadim Sergeyevich is plotting legal chicanery to expropriate the beautiful seaside land on which Nikolay's house is built. The town is forcefully compensating Nikolay with a grossly undervalued sum of 649,000 roubles, and Nikolay believes the Mayor wants the land to build a villa for himself. Nikolay's old friend Dmitry Seleznyov, a sharp and successful lawyer from Moscow, arrives in town to fight the expropriation through the local court system.

After the court rules in favor of the expropriation, Nikolay is arrested at the police station for shouting at the officers, and no one in government will accept Dmitry's new criminal filing against the mayor. However, Dmitry meets with the mayor, extorting him with a thick folder of evidence that incriminates him for past crimes. A shocked mayor agrees to release Nikolay and pay 3.5 million roubles. In a local hotel room, Dmitry and Lilya have an affair.

The next day, the Sergeyevs and Dmitry attend the seaside birthday cookout of Nikolay's friend Ivan Stepanich, where a child runs to the group saying that he just saw Dmitry choking Lilya. Nikolay runs to find them and gunshots are heard. Afterward, Dmitry and Lilya drive back silently together, both with facial bruises. Meanwhile, Mayor Vadim Sergeyevich goes for help to one of his crony bosses, the Russian Orthodox Church bishop, who tells him that all power comes from God and encourages him to stop whining to him and solve his problems forcefully. When Dmitry meets with the mayor to finalize the payment, the mayor's thugs beat Dmitry, and the mayor carries out a mock execution, advising him to return to Moscow. A conciliatory Lilya returns home to Nikolay but is depressed. Dmitry stands sadly looking out the window of a moving train.

While the family is packing to move out, Romka accidentally glimpses Nikolay and Lilya in an intimate encounter and flees the house, collapsing in tears by a whale skeleton on the shore. He returns home late, screaming that Lilya leave forever. That night Lilya is unable to sleep, and instead of going to work in the morning, she goes alone to the ocean cliff. When she turns up missing, Nikolay desperately searches for her and increases his already very heavy consumption of vodka. Her body is discovered a few days later on the shore. A mournful, drunk Nikolay asks the local Orthodox priest Father Vasily why God is doing this to him. Vasily quotes from the Biblical book of Job and counsels Nikolay that when Job accepted his fate, he was rewarded with a long and happy life.

The next morning, Nikolay is arrested for murder. The investigator claims to have evidence that Nikolay had sex with Lilya, killed her with his hammer, and threw her into the sea to hide it. Evidence includes his and Lilya's own friends' testimonies about threats he made to Lilya and Dmitry when he discovered them having sex at the picnic. Nikolay is convicted and sentenced to fifteen years. With no family left, Romka reluctantly agrees to be taken in by Kolya's former friends Polivanovs, to avoid being sent to an orphanage. The Mayor receives a call informing him of Nikolay's sentence, and then gloats that he will now know to keep in his place. Sergeyev's house is torn down.

The bishop gives a sermon extolling the virtues of God's truth versus the world's truth and says that good intentions do not excuse evil acts. He urges the congregation, with the mayor attending, not to act with force or cunning but to put their trust in Christ. As the mayor and other local leaders exit the church and drive away in their luxury European and Japanese cars, it is revealed to be Nikolay's old property.

== Cast ==
- Aleksei Serebryakov as Nikolay Nikolayevich Sergeyev, "Kolya"
- Roman Madyanov as Vadim Sergeyevich Shelevyat, the Mayor of Pribrezhny
- Vladimir Vdovichenkov as Dmitry Mikhaylovich Seleznyov, "Dima", the lawyer friend
- Elena Lyadova as Lilya Petrovna Sergeyeva
- Sergey Pokhodaev as Roman Sergeyev, "Romka"
- Aleksey Rozin as Traffic Police Senior Sergeant Pavel Sergeyevich Polivanov, "Pasha"
- Anna Ukolova as Anzhela Ivanovna Polivanova
- Sergey Bachursky as Traffic Police Lt. Colonel Ivan Stepanovich Degtyaryov, "Stepanych"
- Igor Savochkin as the Investigator
- Platon Kamenev as Vitya, the son of Polivanovs
- Valery Grishko as the Bishop
- Alla Yemintseva as Tarasova, the Presiding Judge
- Margarita Shubina as Goryunovа, the Prosecutor
- Dmitry Bykovsky as Colonel Tkachuk, the Police Chief
- Igor Sergeyev as Father Vasily

== Production ==
When Andrey Zvyagintsev produced a short film in the United States, he was told the story of Marvin Heemeyer. He was amazed by this story and wanted initially to make his film in the US, but then changed his mind. The screenplay was written by Zvyagintsev and Oleg Negin and is loosely adapted from the biblical stories of Job from Uz and King Ahab of Samaria and Heinrich von Kleist's novella Michael Kohlhaas. The script features more than fifteen characters, which is unusually many for a film by Zvyagintsev.

Principal photography took place in the towns of Kirovsk, Monchegorsk, Olenegorsk, near Murmansk on the Kola Peninsula. Preparations on the set began in May 2013. Principal photography took place during three months from August to October the same year. Filming of exterior scenes for Leviathan took place in the town of Teriberka on the Barents Sea coast.

== Release ==
Leviathan premiered at the 2014 Cannes Film Festival, where it was screened on 23 May. It is distributed by Sony Pictures Classics in the United States, Curzon Cinemas in the United Kingdom and by Palace Entertainment in Australia and New Zealand.

The soundtrack includes an extract from the 1983 opera Akhnaten by Philip Glass.

== Reception ==
=== Critical response ===
On review aggregator website Rotten Tomatoes, the film has an approval rating of 97% based on 146 reviews, and an average rating of 8.6/10. The website's critical consensus reads, "Leviathan lives up to its title, offering trenchant, well-crafted social satire on a suitably grand scale." On Metacritic, based on 34 reviews, Leviathan holds an average score of 92 out of 100, indicating "universal acclaim".

Peter Bradshaw, writing a full five-star review for The Guardian, gave the film great praise. Bradshaw thought that the film was "acted and directed with unflinching ambition" and described the film as "a forbidding and intimidating piece of work... a movie with real grandeur". Finding parallels with the Book of Job, The New York Review of Books equated the villains with "Leviathan itself" and three characters (played by Vladimir Vdovichenkov, Aleksey Rozin and Anna Ukolova) with Job's three friends.

Leviathan was picked as the 47th greatest film since 2000 in a 2016 critics' poll by the BBC. In 2019 The Hollywood Reporter critic Todd McCarthy ranked Leviathan the 6th greatest film of the decade.

=== Criticism ===
Thirty-five percent of the funding for Leviathan came from Russia's Ministry of Culture. Vladimir Medinsky, the then Minister of Culture and a conservative historian, acknowledged that the film showed talented moviemaking but said that he did not like it. He sharply criticized its portrayal of ordinary Russians as swearing, vodka-swigging people, which he does not recognize from his experience as a Russian or that of "real Russians". He thought it strange that there was not a single positive character in the movie and implied that the director was not fond of Russians but rather "fame, red carpets and statuettes". In 2015 the Ministry of Culture proposed guidelines that would ban movies that "defile" the national culture.

In turn, when appearing on oppositional TV Rain channel, director Zvyagintsev was criticised by journalist Ksenia Sobchak for accepting government subsidies. Specifically, Sobchak asked whether government funding had had no influence on the content of the movie. In response, Zvyagintsev maintained that he had always felt completely independent from the Ministry in writing and shooting the movie.

Vladimir Pozner, a veteran Russian journalist, said: "Anything seen as being critical of Russia in any way is automatically seen as either another Western attempt to denigrate Russia and the Eastern Orthodox Church, or it's the work of some kind of fifth column of Russia-phobes who are paid by the West to do their anti-Russian work or are simply themselves profoundly anti-Russian."

Metropolitan Simon of Murmansk and Monchegorsk, the diocese where the movie was filmed, issued a statement calling it "honest". He said that Leviathan raised important questions about the state of the country.

=== Accolades ===
On 28 September 2014, it was announced that Leviathan would be Russia's submission for the Academy Award for Best Foreign Language Film at the 87th Academy Awards. It made the January Shortlist of nine films, before being nominated later that month.

The film was named the Best Film at the London Film Festival Awards on 18 October 2014, at a ceremony where the main prizes went to Russia, Ukraine and Syria, three countries at the centre of long-running conflicts. The winning film-makers all said they hoped that culture could help to restore peace to their countries. It was nominated for and won the Best Foreign Language Film award at the 72nd Golden Globe Awards. The film was adjudged the best film of the 45th International Film Festival of India.

Following the Golden Globe Award, Leviathan was leaked online among some of the other Oscar 2015 nominated films. On 12 January the website "Thank you, Leviathan filmmakers" appeared on the internet encouraging social media users to contribute any amount as a gratitude to the filmmakers. Alexander Rodnyanskiy, Leviathan's producer, supported the initiative of Slava's Smirnov (the website's author and an independent digital producer) and asked to transfer the money to the Podari Zhizn charity fund which is held by actresses Chulpan Khamatova and Dina Korzun.

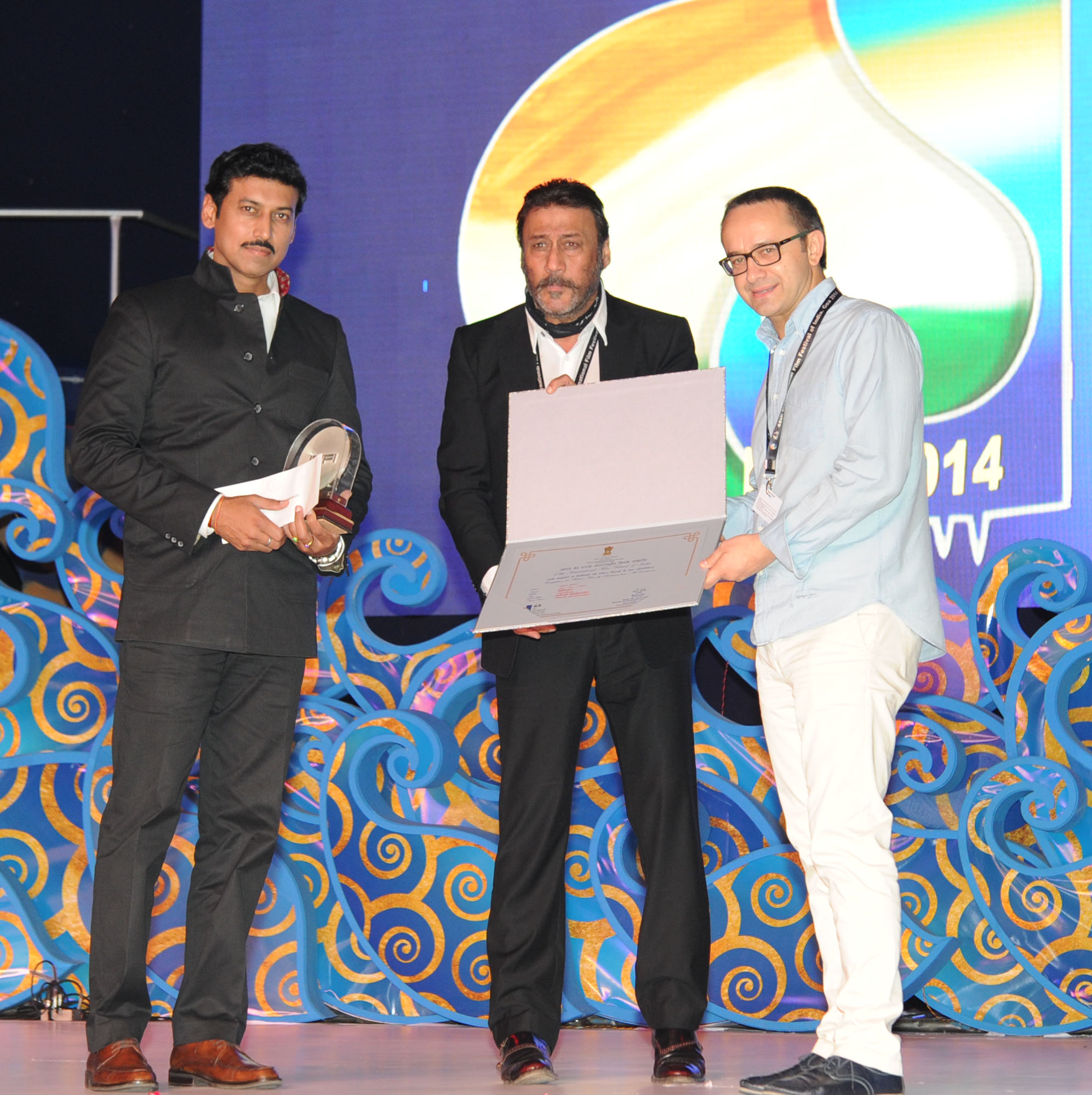
Film being felicitated at IFFI (2014). (From left) Rajyavardhan Singh Rathore, Jackie Shroff and Andrey Zvyagintsev

List of awards and nominations
Award	Category	Recipients and nominees	Result
2014 Cannes Film Festival	Best Screenplay	Andrey Zvyagintsev and Oleg Negin	Won
2014 Cannes Film Festival	Palme d'Or	Andrey Zvyagintsev	Nominated
European Film Award	Best Film	Andrey Zvyagintsev	Nominated
European Film Award	Best Director	Andrey Zvyagintsev	Nominated
European Film Award	Best Screenwriter	Oleg Negin, Andrey Zvyagintsev	Nominated
European Film Award	Best Actor	Aleksei Serebryakov	Nominated
45th International Film Festival of India	Golden Peacock (Best Film Award)	Andrey Zvyagintsev	Won
30th Independent Spirit Awards	Best International Film	Andrey Zvyagintsev	Nominated
International Art Festival of Cinematography	Best Cinematographer	Mikhail Krichman	Won
58th London Film Festival	Best Film	Andrey Zvyagintsev and Alexander Rodnyansky	Won
68th British Academy Film Awards	Best Film Not in the English Language	Andrey Zvyagintsev	Nominated
32nd Munich Film Festival	Best Film	Andrey Zvyagintsev and Alexander Rodnyansky	Won
8th Abu Dhabi Film Festival	Best Narrative; Best Actor	Andrey Zvyagintsev, Alexey Serebryakov	Won
Palm Springs International Film Festival	Best Foreign Language Film	Andrey Zvyagintsev	Won
Asia Pacific Screen Awards
Asia Pacific Screen Awards	Best Feature film	Andrey Zvyagintsev	Won
Asia Pacific Screen Awards	Achievement in Directing	Andrey Zvyagintsev	Nominated
Asia Pacific Screen Awards	Achievement in Cinematography	Mikhail Krichman	Nominated
72nd Golden Globe Awards	Best Foreign Language Film	Andrey Zvyagintsev and Alexander Rodnyansky	Won
13th Golden Eagle Award
13th Golden Eagle Award	Best Direction	Andrey Zvyagintsev	Won
13th Golden Eagle Award	Best Leading Actress	Elena Lyadova	Won
13th Golden Eagle Award	Best Film Editing	Anna Mass	Won
13th Golden Eagle Award	Best Supporting Actor	Roman Madyanov	Won
51st Guldbagge Awards	Best Foreign Film	Leviathan	Won
87th Academy Awards	Best Foreign Language Film	Andrey Zvyagintsev	Nominated
30th Goya Awards	Best European Film	Andrey Zvyagintsev	Nominated
Russian Guild of Film Critics	Best Film	Leviathan	Won
Russian Guild of Film Critics	Best Director	Andrey Zvyagintsev	Won
Russian Guild of Film Critics	Best Screenplay	Oleg Negin, Andrey Zvyagintsev	Won
Russian Guild of Film Critics	Best Director of Photography	Mikhail Krichman	Nominated
Russian Guild of Film Critics	Best Female Actor	Elena Lyadova	Won
Russian Guild of Film Critics	Best Male Actor	Aleksei Serebryakov	Won
Russian Guild of Film Critics	Best Male Supporting Actor	Roman Madyanov	Won
27th Nika Awards	Best Film	Andrey Zvyagintsev, Alexander Rodnyansky	Nominated
27th Nika Awards	Best Director	Andrey Zvyagintsev	Nominated
27th Nika Awards	Best Screenplay	Oleg Negin, Andrey Zvyagintsev	Nominated
27th Nika Awards	Best Cinematographer	Mikhail Krichman	Nominated
27th Nika Awards	Best Actress	Elena Lyadova	Won
27th Nika Awards	Best Actor	Aleksei Serebryakov	Nominated
27th Nika Awards	Best Supporting Actor	Roman Madyanov	Won
27th Nika Awards	Best Supporting Actor	Vladimir Vdovichenkov	Nominated
27th Nika Awards	Best Supporting Actress	Anna Ukolova	Nominated
27th Nika Awards	Best Production Designer	Andrey Ponkratov	Nominated
27th Nika Awards	Best Sound	Andrey Dergachev	Nominated

== See also ==
- List of submissions to the 87th Academy Awards for Best Foreign Language Film
- List of Russian submissions for the Academy Award for Best Foreign Language Film
