= Andrey Zvyagintsev =

Russian filmmaker (born 1964)

- Андрей Звягинцев
- Zvyagintsev in 2026
- Born: Andrey Petrovich Zvyagintsev; 6 February 1964 (age 62); Novosibirsk, RSFSR, Soviet Union
- Education: Russian Institute of Theatre Arts
- Occupation: Filmmaker
- Years active: 1992–present
- Spouse: Anna Matveeva
- Children: 1

Andrey Petrovich Zvyagintsev (Russian: Андрей Петрович Звягинцев, pronounced [ˈzvʲæɡʲɪntsɨf]; born 6 February 1964) is a Russian filmmaker. His films usually explore Russian society and politics in the 21st century, featuring bleak atmosphere and neo-noir style.

His debut film The Return (2003) won the Golden Lion at the Venice Film Festival. Leviathan (2014), Loveless (2017) and Minotaur (2026) won him the Best Screenplay, the Jury Prize and the Grand Prix at the Cannes Film Festival, respectively. Leviathan and Loveless were also nominated for the Academy Award for Best International Feature Film representing Russia.

== Early years and education ==
Zvyagintsev was born in Novosibirsk, Siberia. At the age of 20 in 1984, he graduated from the theater school in Novosibirsk as an actor. From 1986 to 2022, he lived in Moscow, where he continued his studies at the Russian Institute of Theatre Arts until 1990. From 1992 to 2000, he worked as an actor for film and theater. In 2000, he began to work for the TV station REN TV and directed three episodes of the television series The Black Room.

== Career ==
His directing debut feature film, The Return (2003), about two teenage boys and their estranged father, had its world premiere at the main competition of the 60th Venice International Film Festival, where it won the Golden Lion. It was nominated for the Golden Globe Award for Best Non-English Language Film. It was also selected as the Russian entry for the Best International Feature Film at the 76th Academy Awards, but was not nominated.

His second feature film, The Banishment (2007), had its world premiere at the main competition of the 2007 Cannes Film Festival, where it was nominated for the Palme d'Or and won the Best Actor award.

His 2011's Elena (2011), had its world premiere at the Un Certain Regard section of the 2011 Cannes Film Festival, where it won the Special Jury Prize. It also won the Grand Prix at Film Fest Gent.

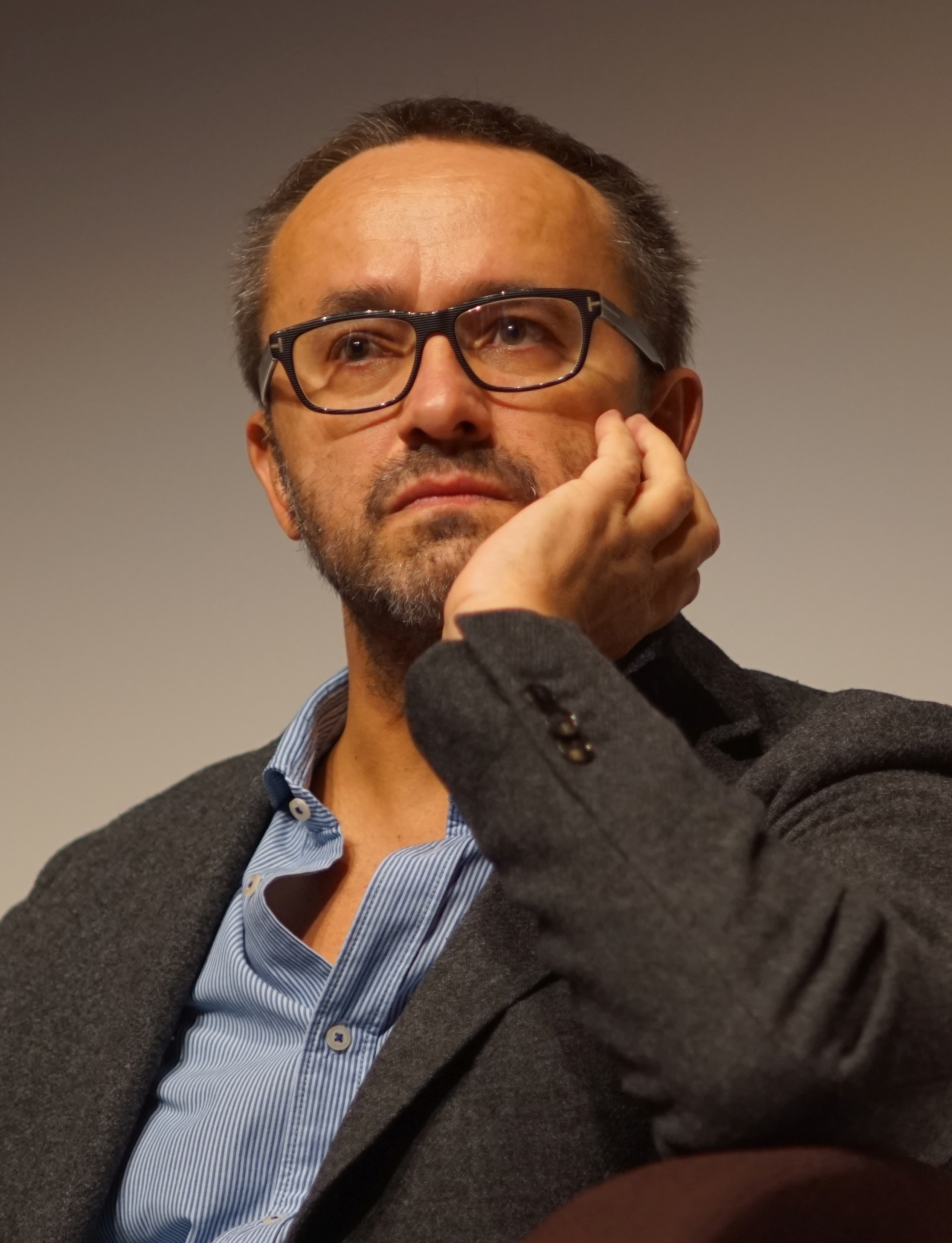
Zvyagintsev in 2016

His fourth feature film, Leviathan (2014), had its world premiere at the main competition of the 2014 Cannes Film Festival, where it was nominated for the Palme d'Or and won the Best Screenplay award. It was nominated for the Golden Globe Award for Best Non-English Language Film and the Academy Award for Best International Feature Film representing Russia. It also won the award for Best Film at the 8th Asia Pacific Screen Awards. In 2015, Zvyagintsev was a jury president of the 18th Shanghai International Film Festival.

His fifth feature film, Loveless (2017), had its world premiere at the main competition of the 2017 Cannes Film Festival, where it was nominated for the Palme d'Or and won the Jury Prize. It later won the Best Film at the 2017 London Film Festival, making him the second director to have won the award twice, having previously been honored for Leviathan. In November 2017, the film won three awards at The Golden Unicorn Awards in London: Best Film, Best Screenplay, Best Actress. It was also nominated for the Golden Globe Award for Best Non-English Language Film and the Academy Award for Best International Feature Film representing Russia. Zvyagintsev won the Achievement in Directing award at the 11th Asia Pacific Screen Awards for Loveless. In March 2018, it won the César Award for Best Foreign Film, making Zvyagintsev the first Russian director to win it. In 2018, Zvyagintsev was a jury member of the Cannes Film Festival.

At the time of his serious COVID-19 infection and long-term hospitalization in mid-2021, Zvyagintsev was working on his English-language feature-length debut, What Happened. The film was put on hold since his hospitalization. In 2023 Zvyagintsev moved to France where he began pre-production on an unrealized project about a Russian oligarch, Jupiter. This film was ultimately shelved after failing to gain financing.

His 2026 drama film Minotaur, was his first film filmed in exile, production took place in Latvia in late 2025. In the backdrop of the Russo-Ukrainian war, it follows broken business executive Gleb discovering his wife Galina has been unfaithful. The film had its world premiere at the main competition of the 2026 Cannes Film Festival, where it received critical acclaim and won the Grand Prix.

== Personal life ==
Andrei Zvyagintsev's first wife was the actress Irina Grinyova; the two divorced after six years of marriage. His second wife is the film editor Anna Matveeva. They have a son, Pyotr (born in 2009).

Zvyagintsev currently lives in exile in France since 2022. He is a vocal critic of the Russian invasion of Ukraine.

=== Illness and recovery ===
In June 2021, Zvyagintsev received the Sputnik V COVID-19 vaccine, possibly while he unknowingly was contaminated, and soon developed a high fever and was taken to a Moscow hospital, where he was admitted to intensive care. Losing most of his lung function, alongside a blood clot, Zvyagintsev developed nosocomial sepsis from an antibiotic-resistant infection, spent weeks in a medically induced coma, contracting Guillain–Barré syndrome, which left him unable to use his arms and legs.

He was transferred to a German hospital, where he remained placed into an artificial coma. After Zvyagintsev's coma was lifted he developed a polyneuropathy that caused him to lose the ability to walk. In addition to paraplegia, the director could neither sit up nor speak as his throat ligaments had been injured. At one point his lungs' capacity to exchange gasses had fallen by 92% and Zvyagintsev's circulatory system was diverted into an extracorporeal membrane oxygenation machine (ECMO). In all, Zvyagintsev was hospitalized for eleven months. He was discharged in May 2022 from a hospital in Wiesbaden, Germany.

=== Political beliefs ===
It was during his rehabilitation in Hanover that his wife Anna Matveeva told him about the Russian invasion of Ukraine. Zvyagintsev ultimately decided that he could not go back home, moving to exile in France.

During the closing ceremony of the 2026 Cannes Film Festival, while accepting the second place prize for Minotaur which follows a Russian wealthy family during the beginning of the Russo-Ukrainian war in 2022, Zvyagintsev demanded Russia's president Vladimir Putin to end “the butchery”, adding: “The only person who can stop this carnage is the President of the Russian Federation. Put an end to this slaughter; the whole world is waiting for it”.

On 18 September 2026, Zvyagintsev was added to the Russian list of foreign agents.

=== In popular culture ===
In the Russian dark-comedy series The Last Minister (2020-2022), Alexander Gorchilin plays a fictional version of Zvyagintsev, who is kidnapped by a secret government agency and forced to make a sequel to Leviathan as part of a psyop to bolster Russia's reputation as the world's bleakest and scariest country.

== Filmography ==
=== Feature films ===
Year	English title	Original title	Director	Writer	Producer	Notes
2003	The Return	Возвращение	Yes	No	No	Golden Lion at the 60th Venice International Film Festival; Nomination for Golden Globe for Best Foreign Language Film
2007	The Banishment	Изгнание	Yes	Yes	No	Co-wrote with Oleg Negin
2011	Elena	Елена	Yes	Yes	No	Co-wrote with Oleg Negin; Special Jury Prize of the Un Certain Regard section at the 2011 Cannes Film Festival
2014	Leviathan	Левиафан	Yes	Yes	No	Co-wrote with Oleg Negin; Best Screenplay at the 2014 Cannes Film Festival; Golden Globe for Best Foreign Language Film; Nomination for Academy Award for Best International Feature Film
2017	Loveless	Нелюбовь	Yes	Yes	No	Co-wrote with Oleg Negin; Jury Prize at the 2017 Cannes Film Festival; Nomination for Golden Globe for Best Foreign Language Film; Nomination for Academy Award for Best International Feature Film
2026	Minotaur	Минотавр	Yes	Yes	Yes	Also Editor; Co-wrote with Simon Lyashenko; Grand Prix at the 2026 Cannes Film Festival

=== Other credits ===
- The Black Room (TV series, 2000)
- New York, I Love You ("Apocrypha" segment, 2009) – segment cut from theatrical release
- Experiment 5IVE ("Mystery" segment, 2011)

== See also ==
- List of Academy Award winners and nominees from Russia
