= Skhodnya (river) =

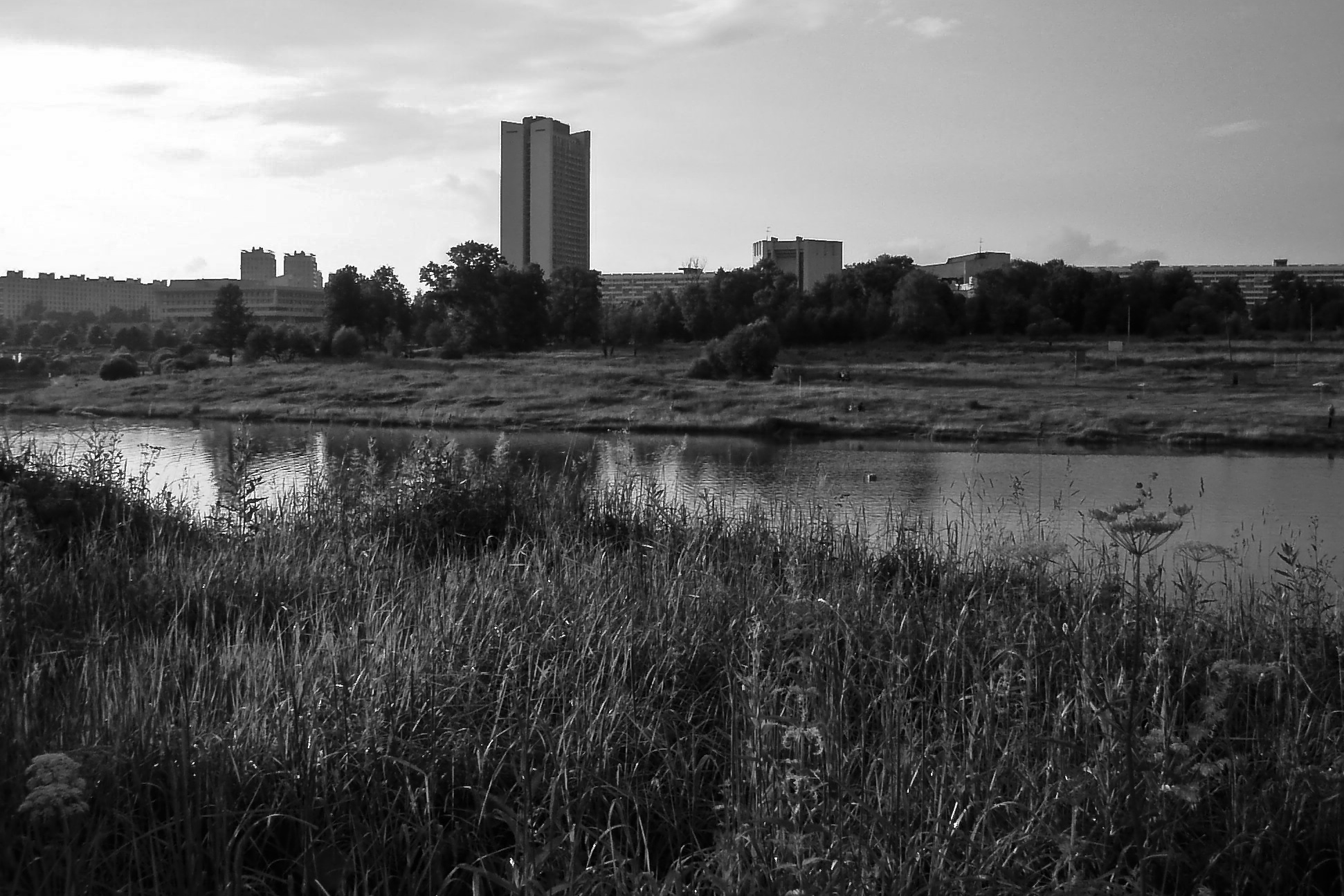
- Skhodnya River in Zelenograd (Large City Pond)
- Native name: Сходня (Russian)

Location
- Country: Russia

Physical characteristics
- Mouth: Moskva
  - coordinates: 55.8234°N 37.4122°E
- Length: 47 km (29 mi)
- Basin size: 255 km^{2} (98 sq mi)

Basin features
- Progression: Moskva→ Oka→ Volga→ Caspian Sea

The Skhodnya (Russian: Сходня, IPA: [ˈsxodʲnʲə]) is a river in the northwest of Moscow and Moscow Oblast, Russia. It is the second-largest tributary of the Moskva, after the Yauza. It is 47 kilometres (29 mi) long (of which 5 km in Moscow proper), and has a drainage basin of 255 square kilometres (98 sq mi). The Skhodnya originates near the village of Alabushevo (part of Zelenograd) and flows into the Moskva River near the Tushino Airfield. The Skhodnya is connected with a derivational canal, which supplies water from the Volga through the Khimki Reservoir (with the help of the Skhodnenskaya hydroelectric plant) to Moscow for sanitary irrigation.

== Gallery ==
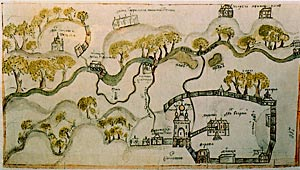
Plan 1692 (Drawing of land along the river Skhodnya near the village Kurkino)

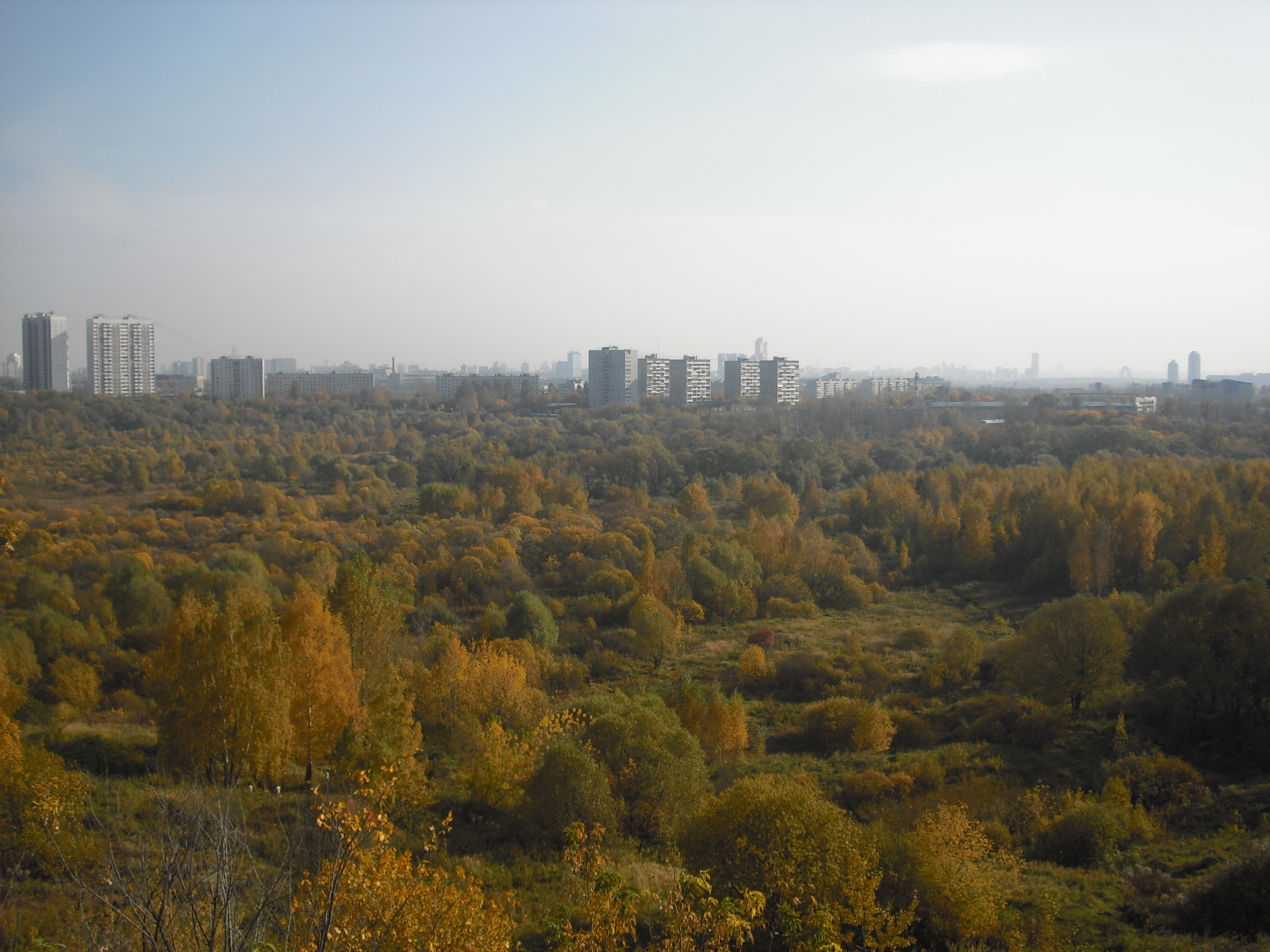

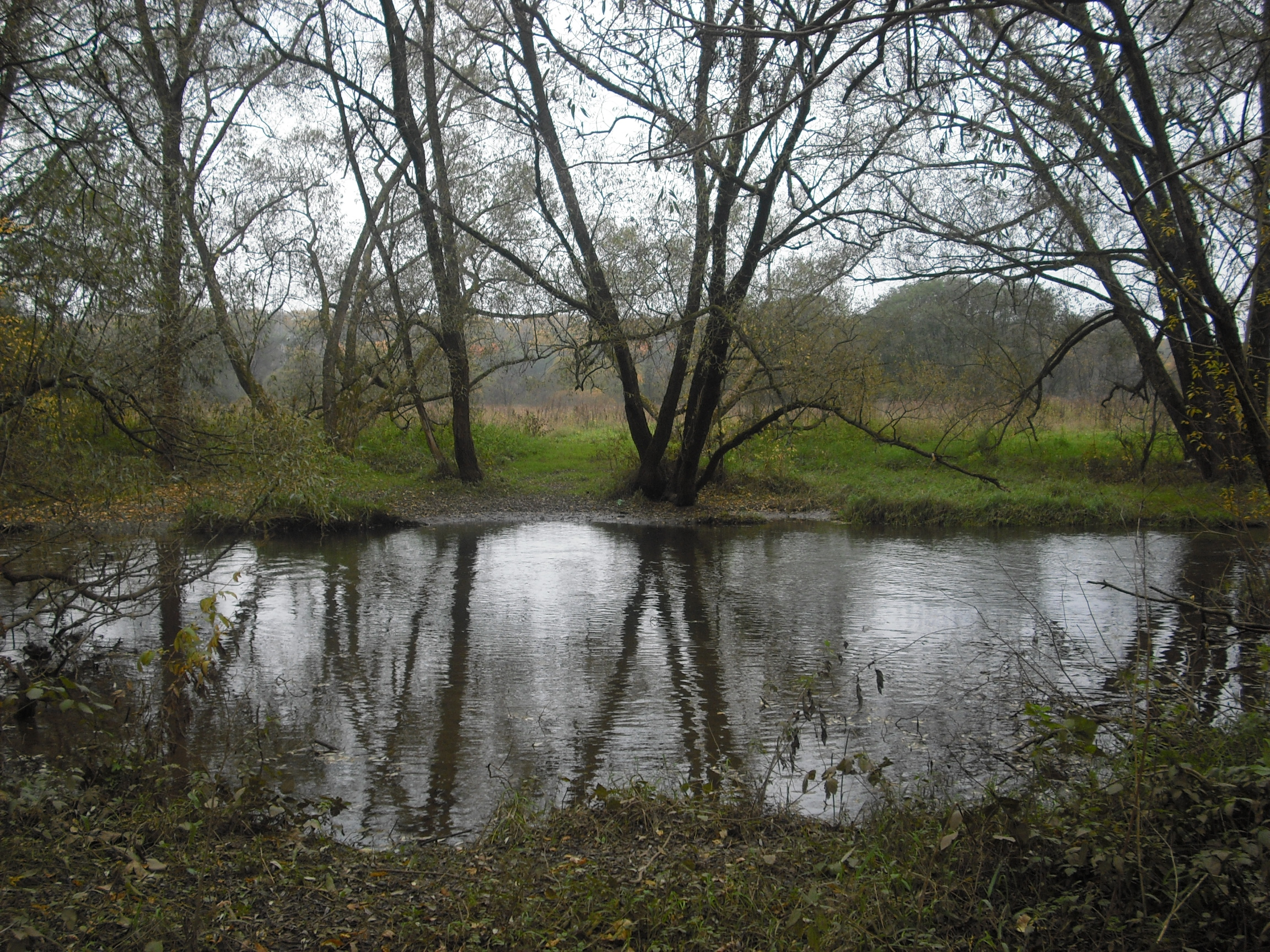

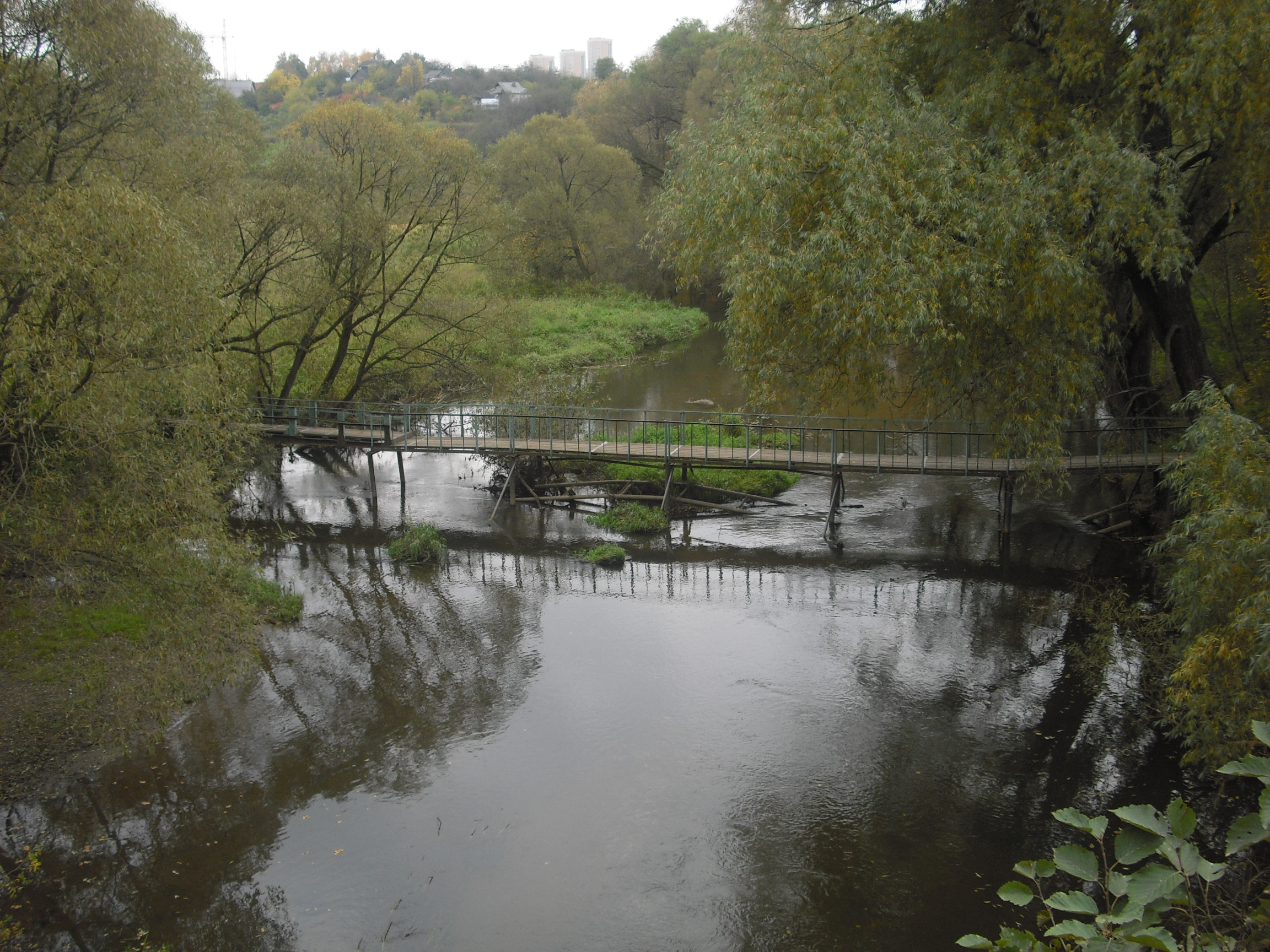

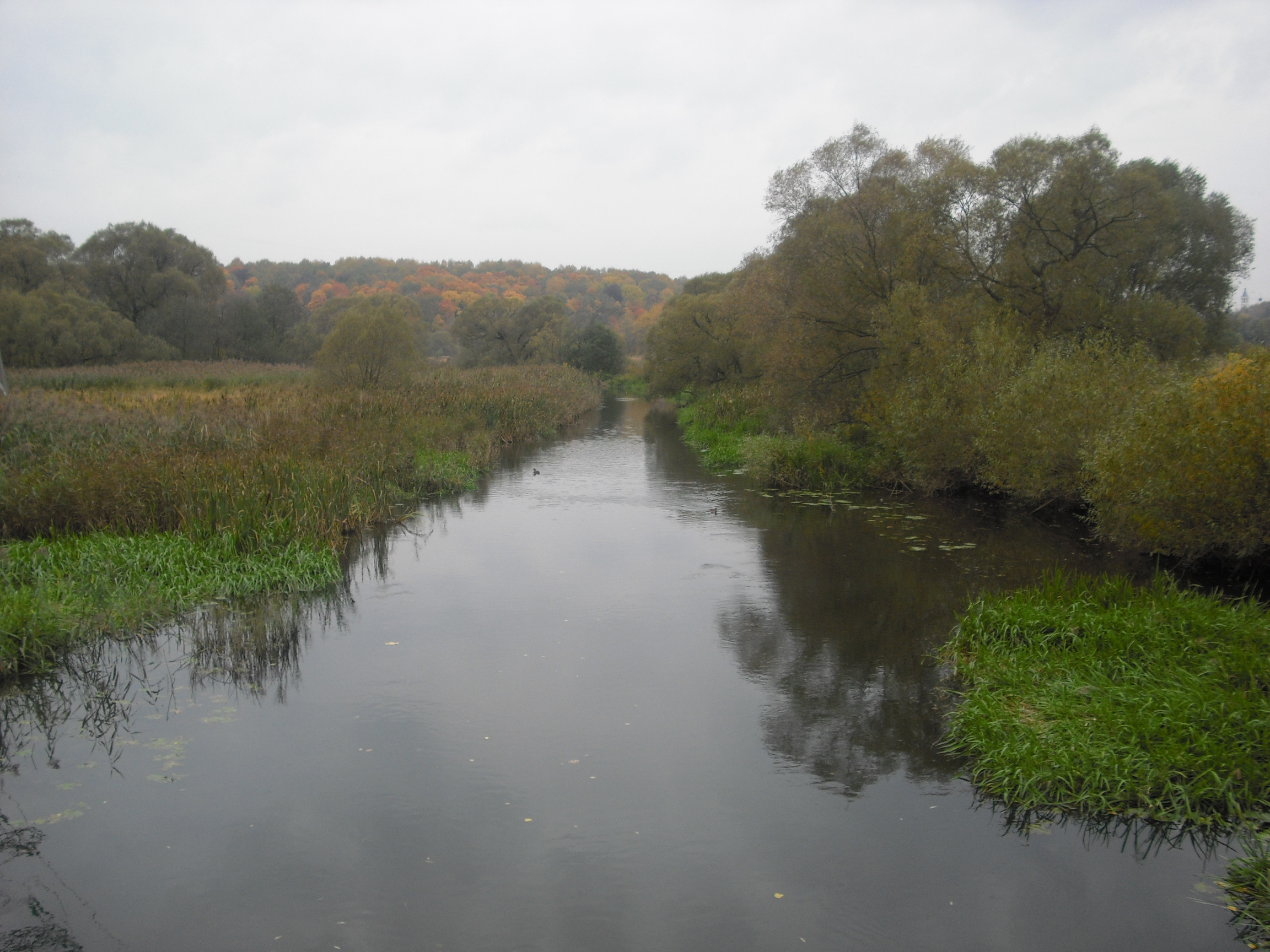

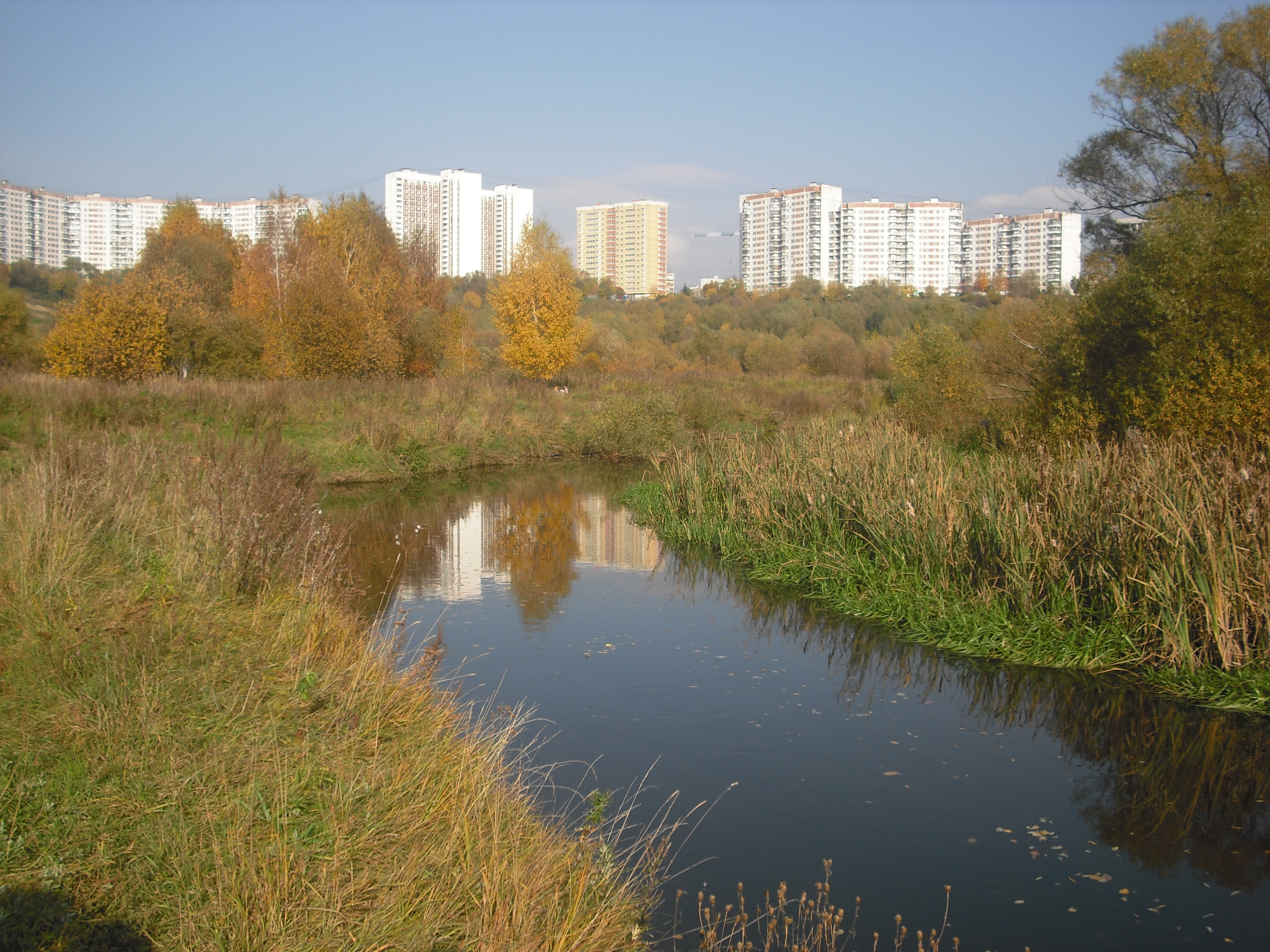

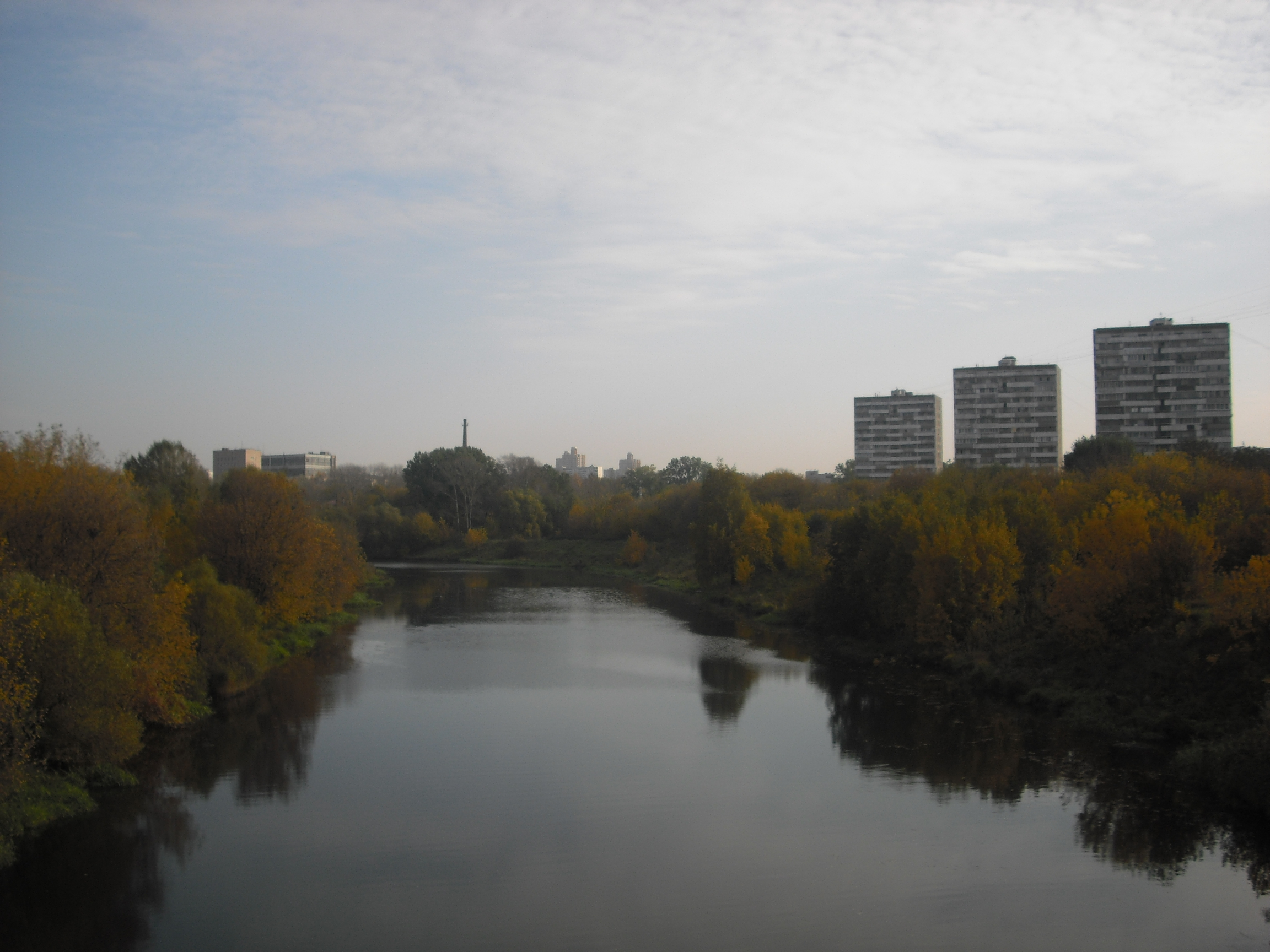
