= Agalakova =

Agalakova (masculine: Agalakov) is a Russian surname. Notable people with the surname include:

- Viktoriya Agalakova (born 1996), Russian actress
- Zhanna Agalakova (born 1965), Russian journalist
