= Vadim Abramov (television presenter) =

Ukrainian TV presenter, actor, and DJ

- Вадим Олександрович Абрамов
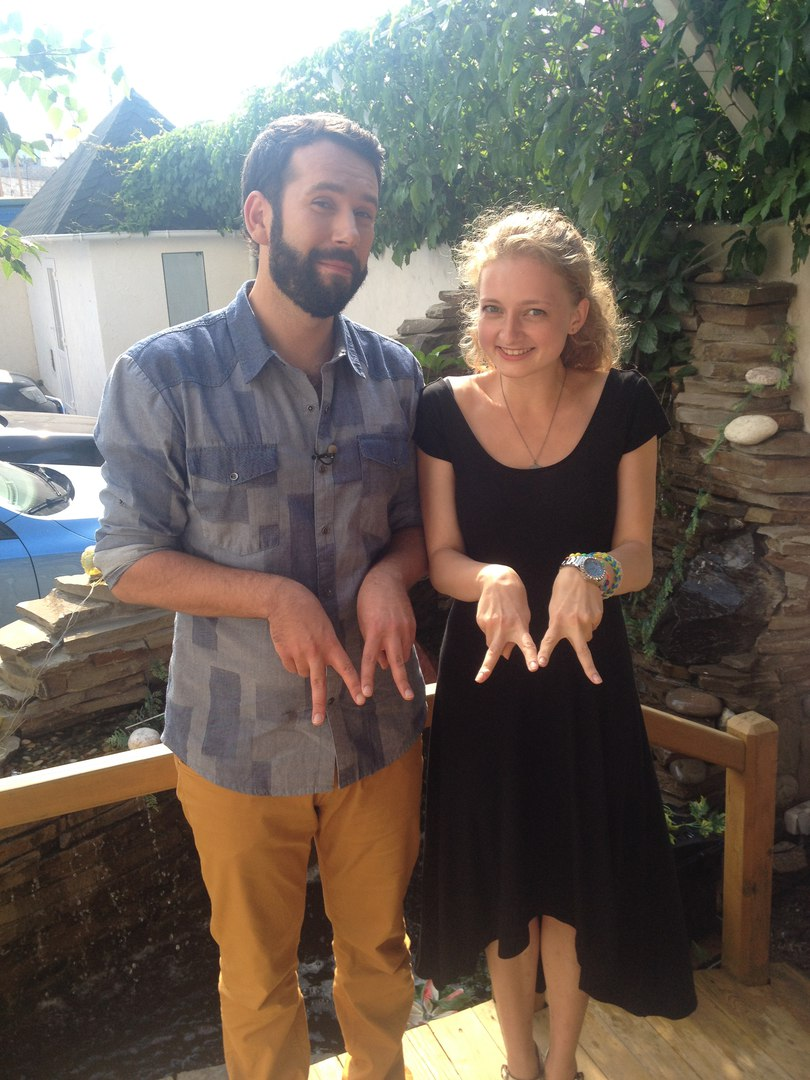
- Vadim Abramov
- Born: November 12, 1980 (age 45); Kyiv, Ukraine
- Occupations: Actor, DJ, TV presenter
- Years active: 1999–present
- Known for: Hosting "Revizor", "Open Space", "Four Dachas"

Vadim Abramov (Ukrainian: Вадим Олександрович Абрамов; born November 12, 1980; Kyiv, Ukraine) actor and DJ. Ukrainian TV anchorman (of the year 2013-2016)

== Biography ==
Abramov was born on November 12, 1980, in Kyiv, Ukraine. After graduating from school with honors, he entered the National Technical University of Ukraine "Kyiv Polytechnic Institute" at the Faculty of Management and Marketing. In 1999, the first working morning TV presenter entertainment show on TV BIZ-TV Ukraine, then became editor of the TV channel. In 2009, professional DJ career starts, and he participated in the theater-studio improvisation "Black Square". Later, Vadim Abramov transferred to another improvisational theater, which included taking part in various performances. By the close of MTV Ukraine was the leading talk show Open Space, in 2013 became the leading comedy show "cabinet" with Svetlana Permyakova the TV channel Pyatnica!, (Russia) and Novyi Kanal (Ukraine). 2015 was the leading social reality "Revizor" on Novyi Kanal (Ukraine), replacing Olha Freimut. At the beginning of 2017 Vadim Abramov he left the Revizor program and moved abroad to film his YouTube blog. He is fluent in Russian, English, French, and Spanish.

In 2022, Russia invaded Ukraine, Vadim Abramov left for Russia. His social networks such as Instagram and Facebook are blocked, Where Vadim Abramov did not comment on Russia's invasion of Ukraine, because of this, Vadim Abramov's point of view on the war in his homeland Ukraine is unclear, as he did not express any position on the matter. Later, in 2022, Vadim Abramov starred in the show "Four Dachas" on the TV channel "Friday". It is worth noting that as part of the new project, Abramov has already visited the Krasnodar Territory and Voronezh. At the same time, the Gazprom-Media holding, which includes the "Friday" TV channel, is simultaneously under sanctions from Ukraine, the US and Canada.
