= 1993 (film) =

- Film poster
- Directed by: Alexander Veledinsky
- Written by: Alexander Veledinsky; Sergey Shargunov
- Based on: 1993 by Sergey Shargunov
- Produced by: Zhanna Tedeeva-Kalinina; Aleksandra Voronkova; Dmitry Litvinov
- Starring: Ekaterina Vilkova; Yevgeny Tsyganov; Aleksandr Robak; Aleksandra Rebenok
- Cinematography: Aleksandra Romm
- Edited by: Oleg Kolodnik; Igor Veledinsky
- Production companies: Gate Film; Russia-1; Cinema Fund
- Distributed by: Cinema Atmosphere
- Release date: September 28, 2023
- Running time: 144 minutes
- Country: Russia
- Language: Russian

1993 is a 2023 Russian historical drama film directed by Alexander Veledinsky. The literary basis of the script was the novel 1993 by Sergey Shargunov. It was theatrically released on September 28, 2023.

The film is set in 1993 and depicts the relationship of husband and wife, emergency workers and the process of growing up of their daughter against the backdrop of changes that are about to come.

== Plot ==
The film is set in Moscow during the summer and fall of 1993, amidst the turbulent political events surrounding the 1993 Russian constitutional crisis.

The story follows Viktor (Evgeny Tsyganov), his wife Lena (Ekaterina Vilkova), and their daughter Tanya. Viktor works as a repair technician for an emergency service, while Lena is a dispatcher. The family lives in an old country house they moved to after trading in their Moscow apartment.

The first half of the film portrays the quiet, everyday life of the Bryantsev family: their jobs, household routines, interactions with neighbors (played by Alexandra Rebenok and Alexander Robak), and small joys. However, their peaceful existence is disrupted by the onset of the political crisis in the fall of 1993. Lena supports President Boris Yeltsin, while Viktor becomes critical of the government after the suspension of the Constitution. As the political turmoil escalates, so does the conflict between the couple.

By the time of the October coup, Viktor and Lena find themselves on opposing sides of the barricades—both figuratively and literally. The climax of the film unfolds during the dramatic events of October 3–4, 1993. Viktor is drawn into the violent confrontations at the Ostankino TV center and the White House. Despite his reluctance to take part in the conflict, he is forced to navigate explosions, fires, and gunfire.

The film meticulously recreates the atmosphere of those days, highlighting the stark contrasts between the opposing sides. Viewers witness opposition forces attempting to reach the besieged White House through sewer tunnels, while government supporters receive free meals on Tverskaya Street.

== Cast ==
- Ekaterina Vilkova as Lena
- Yevgeny Tsyganov as Viktor
- Aleksandr Robak as Yans
- Aleksandra Rebenok as Vika, Yans' wife
- Grigoriy Vernik as Aleksey "Sid"
- Elvira Sinelnik as Veronica Donskaya
- Maksim Lagashkin as Mikhail
- Sergey Batalov as Maltsev

== Production ==
The director was Alexander Veledinsky, who wrote the script based on Sergey Shargunov's novel 1993. The film was produced by Zhanna Tedeeva-Kalinina and Aleksandra Voronkova, the main roles were given to Ekaterina Vilkova and Yevgeny Tsyganov. Manufactured by Gate Film.

== Release ==
1993 was premiered on September 28, 2023 and was timed to coincide with the 30th anniversary of the historical events described in it.
