= To the Lake =

Russian thriller television series

- Russian: Эпидемия
- Genre: Post-apocalyptic, thriller, drama
- Based on: Vongozero by Yana Vagner
- Directed by: Pavel Kostomarov
- Starring: Viktoriya Isakova; Kirill Käro; Aleksandr Robak; Natalya Zemtsova; Maryana Spivak; Yuri Kuznetsov; Eldar Kalimulin; Viktoriya Agalakova; Alexander Yatsenko; Saveliy Kudryashov
- Country of origin: Russia
- Original language: Russian
- No. of seasons: 2
- No. of episodes: 16

Production
- Production company: 1-2-3 Production

Original release
- Network: Netflix
- Release: 14 November 2019 – 2 June 2022

To the Lake (Russian: Эпидемия, romanized: Epidemiya, lit. 'epidemic') is a Russian post-apocalyptic thriller television series launched on the Premier platform on 14 November 2019. Its first season is based on Vongozero, a novel by Russian author Yana Vagner. Netflix acquired the first season and released it internationally on 8 October 2020.

== Synopsis ==
Residents of Moscow are infected with an unknown deadly virus, the main symptoms of which are coughing and discoloration of the eyes; after three to four days, death occurs. As the disease becomes an epidemic, the Russian capital gradually turns into a city of the dead: there is no electric power, money has lost its value, chaos and lawlessness reign everywhere, and gangs of marauders gather. The media are panicking, and those who are not yet infected are desperately fighting for food and fuel. The city is quarantined, with all access points closed.

Fleeing from the epidemic, Sergey, along with his second wife, her autistic son, his own son, his ex-wife, his father, and a neighboring family, go to Karelia. There, on a small deserted island in the middle of Vongozero, they plan to hide from the threat of infection in a refuge ship that has been converted into a camping cabin.

Against the background of a global catastrophe, a family drama is played out. People who normally would never have been under the same roof must now unite to try to escape a deadly disease. On the way, they face various dangers, overcome family troubles, learn to survive, and try to forgive.

== Cast and characters ==
- Kirill Käro as Sergey
- Viktoriya Isakova as Anna, Sergey's new wife
- Aleksandr Robak as Lyonya, Sergey's neighbor
- Natalya Zemtsova as Marina, Lyonya's partner
- Maryana Spivak as Irina, Sergey's ex-wife
- Yuri Kuznetsov as Boris Mikhailovich, Sergey's father
- Eldar Kalimulin as Misha, Anna's son, who has autism spectrum disorder
- Viktoriya Agalakova as Polina, Lyonya's daughter
- Saveliy Kudryashov as Anton, Sergey's and Irina's son
- Aleksandr Yatsenko as Pavel, an EMS doctor
- Yura Borisov as Zhenya Korolev, a special forces sergeant who has gone AWOL
- Victoria Drozdova as Nastya, an orphaned girl
- Askar Ilyasov as Aziz, a tattoo artist
- Julia Jendroßek as Sonya, a German sociologist
- Nikita Elenev as Taras, a photographer and Alena's boyfriend
- Victoria Klinkova as Alena, an illustrator and Taras's girlfriend
- Darya Ekamasova as Lakka, a Sámi shaman and healer

== Production ==
=== First season ===
Filming took place in 2018 in the Moscow Oblast and the Arkhangelsk Oblast (in Onega and the village of Malozhma, Onezhsky District). Lake Vongozero was represented by Onega Bay. After its release in Russia, Netflix bought the rights to the series for $1.5 million, according to Kommersant.

=== Second season ===
Directed by Dmitry Tyurin, filming for the second season began in April 2021. In October 2020, the producer of the series, Yevgeny Nikishov, announced that the plot would not be based on Living People, the sequel to Vongozero. Filming completed in early September 2021. The first episode was released on 21 April 2022, by Premier.

== Episodes ==
=== Season 1 (2019–20) ===
No. overall	No. in season	Title	Directed by	Written by	Original release date
1	1	"Episode 1"	Pavel Kostomarov	Roman Kantor	14 November 2019
As a contagious illness, panic, and looting ravage Moscow, a thrown-together band of families and neighbors forms a shaky alliance for survival.
2	2	"Episode 2"	Pavel Kostomarov	Roman Kantor	21 November 2019
The group's frantic escape is disrupted by a costly mistake and human threats. A final destination is chosen.
3	3	"Episode 3"	Pavel Kostomarov	Roman Kantor, "featuring" Alexey Karaulov	28 November 2019
Sparks fly between Polina and Misha. A brutal attack puts a life at risk. Temporary shelter in the storm is shaken by a horrifying discovery.
4	4	"Episode 4"	Pavel Kostomarov	Roman Kantor, "featuring" Alexey Karaulov	5 December 2019
Strangers, both kind and cruel, change the journey's course, and romance blooms in unexpected places. An angry mob causes chaos and a tragic mistake.
5	5	"Episode 5"	Pavel Kostomarov	Roman Kantor, "featuring" Alexey Karaulov	12 December 2019
Discovering someone missing, the caravan doubles back and comes upon a good samaritan...and some horrifying children. The disease reaches the group.
6	6	"Episode 6"	Pavel Kostomarov	Roman Kantor, Alexey Karaulov	20 December 2019
An infection leads to a house divided, and a line is crossed by Irina and Sergey. Flashbacks reveal pain in Sergey, Polina, and Marina's past.
7	7	"Episode 7"	Pavel Kostomarov	Roman Kantor, "featuring" Alexey Karaulov	27 December 2019
After Boris prays, a blessing arrives—along with more heartbreak. Irina and Sergey struggle with their secret. Safe havens prove anything but.
8	8	"Episode 8"	Pavel Kostomarov	Roman Kantor	3 January 2020
Marriage vows make new beginnings. Irina exposes damning secrets from Anna's diary. Pavel grapples with hard choices. A happy reunion is short-lived.

=== Season 2 (2022) ===
No. overall	No. in season	Title	Directed by	Written by	Original release date
9	1	"Episode 9"	Dmitry Tyurin	Roman Kantor, Andrey Ivanov, Rikke Brin, featuring Dmitry Tyurin	21 April 2022
Four young people—Taras, Alena, Aziz, and Sonya—completely unsuited to surviving in the apocalypse, are isolated from civilization in a country house in the Karelian wilderness. They find Zhenya, a deserter from the Russian Special Forces cleaning squad, in the forest. Tension grows as the group runs out of supplies, water, and electricity.
10	2	"Episode 10"	Dmitry Tyurin	Roman Kantor, Andrey Ivanov, Rikke Brin, featuring Dmitry Tyurin	21 April 2022
The protagonists from the first season live in an abandoned military unit without ammunition or food. Sergey sits by the fire all day and thinks about the dead Anya. Misha has withdrawn into himself after his mother's death, and his marriage with Polina is not going well. Everything changes when little Nastya emerges from the dense forest. Circumstances force the group to hastily leave the unit.
11	3	"Episode 11"	Dmitry Tyurin	Roman Kantor, Andrey Ivanov, Rikke Brin, featuring Dmitry Tyurin	28 April 2022
Nastya brings the group to her native Slavic pagan community, where no one knows about the virus and the global epidemic. Lyonya is injured in a hunting accident. Polina and Misha, in a fit of passion, do something irreparable, placing the group's safety in jeopardy.
12	4	"Episode 12"	Dmitry Tyurin	Roman Kantor, Andrey Ivanov, Rikke Brin, featuring Dmitry Tyurin	5 May 2022
The group joins Zhenya and his new comrades and head to a refugee camp in Finland, but a conflict forces them to split up. Zhenya and the first group are trapped in a cave, but they manage to escape. Taras, Alyona, Aziz, and Sonya reach the border first but do not manage to cross.
13	5	"Episode 13"	Dmitry Tyurin	Roman Kantor, Andrey Ivanov, Rikke Brin, featuring Dmitry Tyurin	12 May 2022
Lyonya's hunting injury worsens. Sámi shaman Lakka comes to the group's aid. Anton is jealous of Nastya and tries to poison the girl with herbs. The group notices her illness in time and save her, but more troubles are in store for Nastya.
14	6	"Episode 14"	Dmitry Tyurin	Roman Kantor, Andrey Ivanov, Rikke Brin, featuring Dmitry Tyurin	19 May 2022
Orthodox pilgrim Rodion, who went mad after losing his family to the virus on a rail journey to the Solovetsky Monastery, mistakes little Nastya for his dead daughter. Anton and Marina search for the girl.
15	7	"Episode 15"	Dmitry Tyurin	Roman Kantor, Andrey Ivanov, Rikke Brin, featuring Dmitry Tyurin	26 May 2022
Lakka has a prophetic vision and tells the group to set off immediately. They decide to take the train, driven by Zhenya, to the monastery. A Chinese man sneaks onto the train, pursued by Russian soldiers. The condition of the train and the tracks cause a death in the group.
16	8	"Episode 16"	Dmitry Tyurin	Roman Kantor, Andrey Ivanov, Rikke Brin, featuring Dmitry Tyurin	2 June 2022
The group, the military men, and the Chinese prisoner are attacked by a band of former teenage prisoners at a penal colony, but escape. At a lighthouse on the shore of the White Sea, they send a signal to the residents of the monastery, who accept them onto their boat to take them to the island. It turns out that the virus has reached the monastery, but a certain "savior" has come to the rescue. The military men have a conflict with the monks, which results in the deaths of many on the boat. Zhenya is seriously wounded. The boat sinks, but the survivors reach the island shore, where they recognize a familiar face.

== Reception ==
To the Lake has an approval rating of 100% on review aggregator website Rotten Tomatoes, based on six reviews, and an average rating of 8/10.

== Controversy ==
The fifth episode of season 1 disappeared from Premier's platform on 14 December 2019, just two days after its release. In it, hospital patients and other civilians are executed by men who appear to be security forces, prompting speculation that the episode had been censored. However, the company said the second half of the season was postponed until February 2020, due to the success of another series, and that the fifth episode was part of the second half. Director Pavel Kostomarov said the episode's removal came as a surprise and that he was not given a reason.

On 20 December, the episode reappeared on Premier. Culture Minister Vladimir Medinsky denied media reports that he was involved in the controversy, saying, "there is no censorship in our country" and that the episode's removal was of a "technical nature". Premier said the season would continue to air weekly until its conclusion, at the request of viewers.

== Awards and recognition ==
- On 23 June 2019, the series received an award for cinematic achievement at the inaugural Chitka festival in Moscow.
- On 13 September 2019 the series was presented at the 43rd "Cinema Symposium of the International Association of Film Commissions (AFCI)" in St. Petersburg.
- On 11 February 2020, it was shortlisted for the VIII Award of the Association of Film and Television Producers in 15 nominations.
- On 1 April 2020, the series received the Fresh TV Fiction rating of the Swiss research company the WIT, which highlights notable international projects.
- On 7 October 2020, To the Lake took eighth place in series rankings on Netflix. By 11 October, it had climbed to fourth place.
- On 12 October 2020, American horror writer Stephen King called the series "damn good".
