= Cosmoball =

- Theatrical release poster
- Directed by: Dzhanik Fayziev
- Screenplay by: Andrey Rubanov (ru); Dzhanik Fayziev; Drew Row; Twister Murchison
- Based on: Galactik Football by Frederic Dybowski; Antoine Charreyron
- Produced by: Sergey Selyanov (ru); Dzhanik Fayziev; Innokentiy Malinkin
- Starring: Yevgeny Romantsov; Viktoriya Agalakova; Maria Lisovaya; Ivan Ivanovich; Liza Taychenacheva; Yevgeny Mironov; Elena Yakovleva; Mikhail Yefremov; Dmitry Nazarov; Svetlana Ivanova
- Cinematography: Maksim Osadchy
- Edited by: Rod Nikolaychuk
- Music by: Tony Neiman
- Production companies: Bonanza Studio; CTB Film Company; KIT Film Studio; Main Road Post; Russia-1; Channel One; STS; Cinema Fund; AvtoRadio
- Distributed by: Nashe Kino (Our Cinema)
- Release date: August 27, 2020 (Russia)
- Running time: 118 minutes
- Country: Russia
- Languages: Russian; English
- Budget: ₽786 million; $15–22 million
- Box office: ₽106.6 million; $1.4 million (Worldwide); $1.4 million (Russia/CIS)

Cosmoball, also known as Goalkeeper of the Galaxy (Russian: Вратарь Галактики, romanized: Vratar Galaktiki) is a 2020 Russian 3D superhero space opera film written and directed by Dzhanik Fayziev, based on the animated series Galactik Football, with the participation of the television channel Russia-1. The film is set in the future, a post-apocalyptic city in a world inhabited by survivors of an intergalactic war that has shifted the planet's poles. Above the city towers a huge alien ship - it is a stadium, the planet's fate rests in the hands of the willing and capable Cosmoball players who are defending the Earth. The fate of the planet depends on the result of the match between earthlings and aliens.

Andrey Rubanov also participated in the writing of the script, and among the producers are Sergey Selyanov and Innokentiy Malinkin. It stars Yevgeny Romantsov as Anton a goalkeeper to the national team, alongside Viktoriya Agalakova, Maria Lisovaya, Ivan Ivanovich, Liza Taychenacheva, Yevgeny Mironov, and Elena Yakovleva in supporting roles.

Location filming began on June 2, 2017 and principal photography locations included the Mosfilm Studios. Shooting took place at Mosfilmovskaya Street in Moscow, and lasted until mid-September 2017. The film required a wide use of computer-generated imagery to portray the rare alien races and space monsters.

Cosmoball was scheduled to be theatrically released in Russia on August 27, 2020, in 2D, RealD 3D formats, with distribution in Russia handled by "Nashe Kino" (English: "Our Cinema").

The film was the first major Russian project to be released after the limitation of the number of viewers in cinemas due to the outbreak of the coronavirus. The film grossed 106 million rubles with a budget of 786 million rubles, becoming a box-office failure.

== Plot ==
In a post-apocalyptic era, the Earth has been ravaged by a series of galactic wars, leading to the destruction of the Moon and the shifting of the Earth's poles, drastically changing the planet's climate. Moscow now lies in a tropical forest zone, while New York is covered in ice. The city is a hub of diversity, resembling an anti-utopian cyberpunk version of Brazil, where representatives of different races and subcultures, strange individuals, exotic animals, and engineering marvels coexist on sun-drenched streets.

Hovering over Moscow is an enormous alien spaceship, which serves as a stadium for the intergalactic sport of Cosmoball, a game that combines football and gladiator-style combat. The stakes are high as the outcome of each game affects the fate of entire worlds, including that of Earth.

In 2071, Earth is caught in the middle of a galactic conflict that has altered its climate. The polar shift has placed Moscow in a tropical zone, while New York is frozen. Above the city, the colossal alien spacecraft serves as a stadium for Cosmoball competitions that attract viewers from all over the galaxy. The game can only be played by athletes which in this case are individuals with extraordinary abilities who are considered gods by the public. The people of the galaxy revere the athletes, as the outcome of their matches impacts the future of entire planets.

The protagonist, Anton, is an ordinary young man who dreams of finding a job to help support his family. However, everything changes when his hidden superhuman abilities are discovered, and he is recruited to play for the Cosmoball team. As Anton begins his journey as a player, he remains unaware of the significant role that fate has in store for him. The final match, in which he participates, will turn into a battle for the future of Earth.

== Cast ==
- Yevgeny Romantsov as Anton (Magli sputnik-droid), the Earthling's cosmoball team goalkeeper.

Growing up without a father, he hates cosmoball. Anton thinks only about how to prolong the life of his sick mother and is forced to steal medicines from pharmacies which have turned into strategically important and specially protected facilities. But ironically, it was he who was given the power of teleportation, which he does not yet know how to use, and it is he who will become the leader of the Earth national cosmoball team and the main defender of our planet.

- Viktoriya Agalakova as Natalya 'Natasha' (Kisa sputnik-droid) the Earthling's cosmoball team captain.

A young girl who devoted her whole life to sports. Straight, decisive, and courageous, she is used to winning in everything.

- Maria Lisovaya as Valaya / Anya

Has shapeshifting abilities. Anton runs into Anya in the slums of tropical Moscow, hiding from the police. Like Anton she also hates cosmoball. Bold and determined, she tries to push him into a strong protest.

- Ivan Ivanovich as Pele (Susya sputnik-droid)

Pele is a virtuoso Latin American striker from snowy Brazil. The fastest and strongest on the Earth's national cosmoball team. He is used to taking care of his girls - Natasha and little Fan. Pele's neck and part of his face are covered with an intricate ethnic tattoo.

- Yelizaveta Taychenacheva as Fan (Gosha sputnik-droid)

The smallest person on the Earth's national cosmoball team, she can deftly deceive the opponent by sneaking right in front of their nose, but quickly gets tired on the field.

- Yevgeny Mironov as Belo, trainer-mentor

The Earth team is coached by an alien genius scientist with long white hair and purple eyes. Belo has his own interest on Earth and in the national team - only he fully understands what kind of evil they are opposing, and this victory in this confrontation became the meaning of his life.

- Elena Yakovleva as Anton's mother
- Mikhail Yefremov as Vasiliy, a police officer
- Mikhail Stenin as Vasiliy's assistant
- Dmitry Nazarov as a police chief
- Svetlana Permyakova as an evil woman at the stock exchange
- Yan Tsapnik as a sports commentator
- Gosha Kutsenko as a red-faced security guard

The Amazonian team

- Julia Vins as amazon U
- Khristina Blokhina as amazon Vo
- Valeriya Bukina as amazon Bu
- Stanislav Rogachev as amazon Kho

The Siriusian team

- Alexey Rakhmanov as captain of the Siriusians
- Yevgeny Kosyrev as siriusian Stan
- Pavel Dorofeev as a siriusian
- Alexey Pavlov as a siriusian

The North American

- Wolfgang Cerny as a bearded man with Times Square
- Svetlana Ivanova as bearded man's wife

== Production ==
=== Development ===
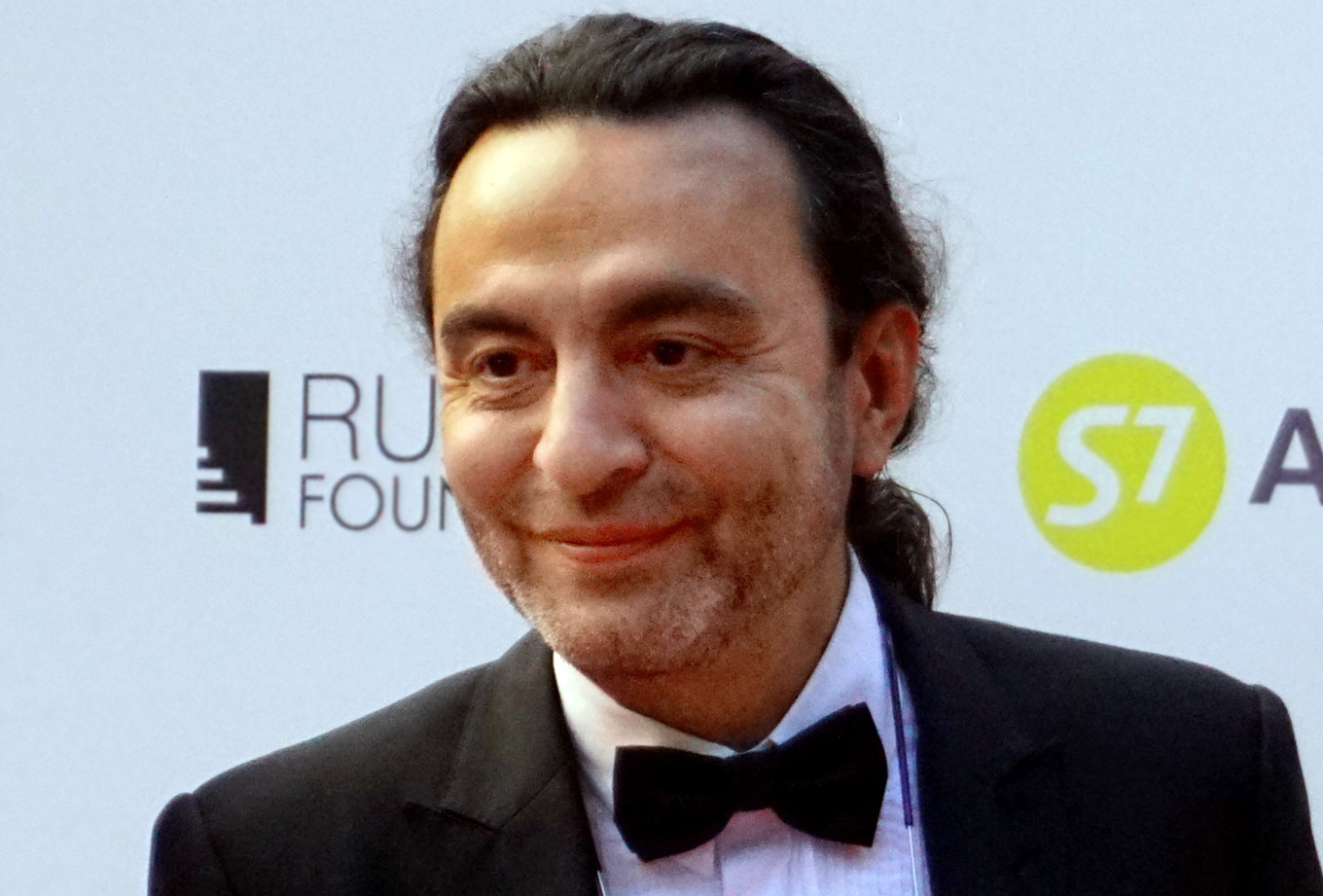
Dzhanik Fayziev, writer and director of Cosmoball, at Kinotavr in 2016.

In August 2014, Dzhanik Fayziev announced that he is planning to film a blockbuster titled Cosmoball about a Russian superhero fighting alien invaders, inspired by the comics of the Marvel Universe, and not about the new work of Russian directors who have decided to take the superhero cinema to a completely new level, Russia Today reports.

Fayziev clarified that, according to the plot, people evolved and became part of a galactic society fighting creatures that look like "super-reactive turboballs", therefore battles with them resemble football, hence the name of the film. The nickname of the superhero is Lev Yashin.

Producing was done by Dzhanik Fayziev's company Bonanza Studio, which had success with the films The Turkish Gambit and Furious, a historical fantasy film. He is also the co-producer and co-author of the script.

We have been developing this project for about five years, applying a very detailed approach: the script, the characters and their images, locations, costumes, sets and, of course, graphics. In my opinion, the number of graphics and special effects in Cosmoball is more or less equal to what our industry created in the last five years. We have learned to create world standard computer graphics. However, I'll say it again, Cosmoball, in terms of the quality of special effects, shall become a transition to a new coordinate system, to a whole new level.

— producer Sergey Selyanov

Executive producing of the film was entrusted to Sergey Selyanov (ru), director of the CTB Film Company. The preliminary development of the project took almost 5 years.

Maksim Osadchy known for his work on Stalingrad and The Duelist, was hired as cinematographer. The authors of the script were Twister Murchison, Drew Row, and Andrey Rubanov.

In order to promote the film, main broadcasting companies of Russia - Channel One, Russia-1 and CTC Media joined forces.

=== Casting ===
The main roles in the film were performed by sports-men instead of professional actors. Lead actor Yevgeny Romantsov graduated from the Moscow State Academy of Physical Culture (majoring in theory and methodology of football and hockey). Romantsov previously took part in productions of the Gogol Center. Russian actress Viktoriya Agalakova (née Glukhikh) studied ballet, acrobatics, and choreography, which proved to be useful when filming dynamic scenes on suspensions. Agalakova works at the Saint Petersburg State Theater of Musical Comedy. They were accompanied by аctress Maria Lisovaya, a graduate of the Boris Shchukin Theatre Institute.

The fourth unknown actress who joined them was the winner of international competitions in rhythmic gymnastics Yelizaveta "Liza" Taychenacheva, an actress who previously competed in biathlon and the Children's teams of Youth Sports Schools "Youth of Moscow". They were all cast because of their sporting past.

They were joined by famous actors such as Yevgeny Mironov, Elena Yakovleva, Mikhail Yefremov, and others.

Director Dzhanik Fayziev's film is one of the most expensive and high-tech projects that is being shot in Russia. On the walls of the pavilion, there is a blue chroma key on which backgrounds will be drawn. In one frame with live actors - virtual characters, drawn from scratch or with the help of digital capture technology acting game motion capture.

=== Filming ===
Principal photography commenced in the scenery on the territory of Mosfilm Studios in Moscow, and lasted from June 2 to mid-September 2017.

On an area of over 3,500 square meters built transforming the scenery of the streets and interiors of post-apocalyptic Moscow, with thousands of props created by the artists specifically for the film. In the shooting involved up to 500 actors for crowd scenes, and for each a unique costume was stitched. In the Studio, costume designers were delivered 1.5 tons of items lightweight summer clothing from India were delivered.

When working with images, sophisticated prosthetics were used: one of the characters, Valaya — is in a suit covered with silicone pads throughout her whole body. This took seven hours to create for the make-up-artist.

=== Post-production ===
For the post-production of visual effects is engaged in the studio Main Road Post, according to the company's general director Arman Yakhin.

One of the biggest challenges of the project was a large number of digital characters (over 50), both completely virtual and recreated using motion capture of actors. For this work, the walls of the Mosfilm pavilions were covered with blue chroma key, on which the backgrounds were painted. In the first case, the actor on the court interacts with the dimensional toy, in the second - with the actor in a blue suit with inertial sensors. Through the use of augmented reality technology, the director could see on his monitor a full-fledged image immediately, that is, instead of a blue person - an alien.

Additional work on creating a unique world of the picture, was done by visual effects specialists from the studio Main Road Post.

== Music ==
Cosmoball: The Movie Soundtrack

Film score by Tony Neiman
- Released: November 2, 2020
- Recorded: 2020
- Genre: Film score
- Length: 1:08:49
- Languages: English, Russian
- Label: Tony Neiman

The music score was composed by Italian musician Tony Neiman.

== Release ==
The film's original premiere date was previously scheduled for January 24, 2019. It was delayed because on this date the creative group had some difficulties.

In September 2018, it was announced that the release date was postponed to October 17, 2019. As previously assumed, the picture would be presented to viewers on August 27, 2020. On its previously scheduled release date, its former slot was taken by Maleficent: Mistress of Evil.

The film's premiere was held on August 25, 2020, at the cinema "Karo 11 October" in Moscow, and was released in cinemas in the following weekend. This was the first major Russian film release after the quarantine, and it was scheduled to be released in the Russian Federation by Nashe Kino in RealD 3D format on August 27, 2020.

=== Marketing ===
The first teaser for the film was shown on September 30, 2017, during the IgroMir / Comic-Con Russia festival, when the director presented the film to the audience.

== Reception ==
=== Box office and VOD ===
The film became the first major national blockbuster in Russia to be released after the effects of the outbreak of the coronavirus in Russia that forced a restriction on the number of viewers in cinemas, and put in the amount of 106.6 million Russian rubles (about $1.4 million) compared to a budget of 786,4 million rubles.

The film was released on digital rental in Russia on October 9, 2020, at the KinoPoisk HD online cinema.

=== Critical response ===
The film received mostly low to average ratings from Russian critics, who noted the weak storyline and expressionless dialogues of the characters.

Nikolai Kornatsky from "Film Art" wrote that with the visual part, everything is also not cosmic. The graphics themselves - unprecedented for our cinema - are in no way inferior to either Valerian (2017) or Guardians of the Galaxy (2014). But this whole huge, loud and populous world all too often evokes a sense of déjà vu.

Anton Dolin noted that the film lacks a clearly invented world, the laws, and background of which the authors begin to explain to the audience from the first seconds, but they continue to struggle until the very end. An interesting plot, since three stories - about Dr. Frankenstein and the monster he spawned, about a naive boy who will eventually grow into a messiah, and about a sports competition - do not fit well with each other.
