= Revizor (TV series) =

- Ревізор
- Genre: Reality Television
- Directed by: Sergey Ozeryansky; Danilo Dzhepo; Denis Tarasov; Andrey Korotun
- Creative director: Viktoria Burdukova
- Presented by: Olha Freimut (Seasons 1-4); Vadim Abramov (Season 5-7); Mykola Tyshchenko (Season 8-9); Elena Filonova (Ukrainian journalist and blogger) (Season 9-10); Yulia Pankova (Season 10-11 + Special season "Quarantine" (Карантин)); Anna Zhizha (Season 5-9)
- Country of origin: Ukraine
- Original languages: Ukrainian; Russian
- No. of seasons: 11
- No. of episodes: 127

Production
- Producers: Maria Pavlichuk; Anastasia Krasikov; Irina Titarenko
- Editor: Anna Zhizha

Original release
- Network: Novyi Kanal (Ukraine)
- Release: August 27, 2011 – present

Revizor (Ukrainian: Ревізор (Note: Derived from the Ukrainian name of Gogol's story The Government Inspector)) is a Ukrainian social reality TV show about the quality of service sector establishments in Ukraine. It is a broadcast on Novyi Kanal, and began on August 27, 2011.

== Series overview ==
Revizor was broadcast in Ukraine in following order:

- Season 1: August 27, 2011
- Season 2: January 4, 2012
- Season 3: March 4, 2013
- Season 4: March 3, 2014
- Season 5: March 2, 2015
- Season 6: August 31, 2015
- Season 7: March 7, 2016
- Season 8: July 30, 2017
- Season 9: September 30, 2018
- Season 10: October 7, 2019
- Special season "Quarantine" (Карантин): April 16, 2020
- Season 11: July 20, 2020

== About ==
Revizor, the first social Ukrainian reality show, is produced by Novyi Kanal. The project was initiated in collaboration with leading hotel inspectors, restaurants, and various sectors of the service industry with the goal of educating consumers about the quality of service provided by these establishments. This ensures the independence and objectivity of revise.

The host of the Revisor always had many pairs of white cotton gloves with him. Also, it was a symbol of the program. Dirt was determined with their help.

Also, the team always had with them devices for determining standards. These are such as:

- Hydrometer
- Pyrometer (from the fifth season)
- Hygrometer
- Oil quality analyzer (from the fifth season)
- Luminometer (from the tenth season) (to check surface or liquid cleanliness)
- Sound level meter

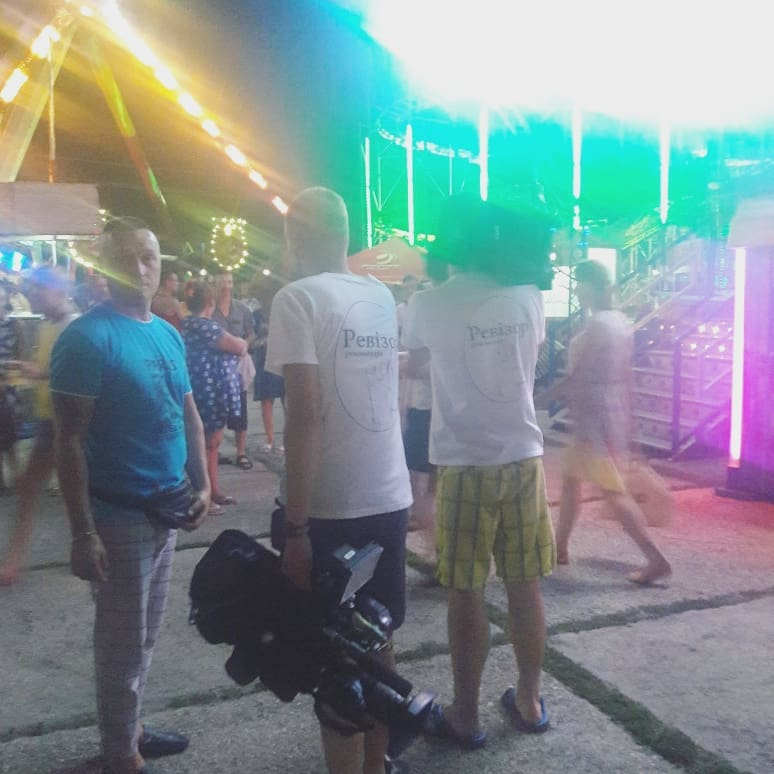
The "Revisor" team in Kyrylivka

In 2012, Revizor received a national award for the television show Triumph due to its value and quality, as well as the recognition of industry professionals. In 2013, the project was nominated in the categories of Best Infotainment Program and Best Leading Entertainment. The same year, Revizor won an award for Favorite TV-Show. In 2014, the presenter Olha Freimut received the TV Star award from the magazine Telenedelya for her role as the host of Revizor.

== The first season ==
The first season of the show, which commenced on August 27, 2011, highlighted the significance of the project. The Revizor checked various public location. From restaurants to parks.

Olga Freimut became the host of the Revizor.

It achieved recognition in the Book of Records Ukraine by amassing over 72 thousand users on its official Facebook page at the time of the premiere.

== The second season ==
The second season of the Ukrainian reality show Revisor continued the traditions of the first season, focusing on checking the quality of service in restaurants, hotels and other establishments throughout Ukraine. Olga Freimut remained the host of the program.

This season, Revisor visited many cities and towns. For example, Lviv, where the program team made a number of video recordings that were not broadcast (some of them can be seen on the Internet). The show continued to expose flaws in the establishments, highlighting issues with cleanliness, service and food quality.

== The third season ==
On March 4, 2013, the third season began with a new approach. The inspection team revisited establishments that had previously undergone inspections to assess if they had improved and were now deserving of recommendations. The focus was not solely on conducting tests but also on recognizing establishments that had met higher quality standards. Notably, the recommendations previously awarded with Silver status during the first and second seasons were declared invalid as of January 1, 2013. During these follow-up inspections, the original "Silver" plates were removed. If an establishment met the hygiene standards, they were awarded new Golden plates. However, if they failed to meet the standards, no replacement was provided, and the "Silver" plates were taken by the inspection team.

In addition to inspecting facilities within Ukraine, the third season of Revizor took the crew to other European countries, including Austria, France, Italy, and the UK, to evaluate and assess various establishments.

== The fourth season ==
During the 4th season, Revizor introduced a new innovation where hotels and restaurateurs who successfully passed the inspection received a public recommendation from the Revizor team. This move led to various controversies and scandals during the studio shows.

After the filming of the video materials for the 4th season, it was decided to open an additional talk show Strastri za Revizorom(Страсті за Ревізором). It is focused on the discussion of the events that took place after the visits of the Revisor team to various institutions. The show invites venue owners, staff who have faced criticism and customers to speak their minds and tell their own version of events.

== The fifth season ==
On March 2, 2015, the fifth season of the show was launched on TV with a new presenter, Vadim Abramov. In this season, the recommendations were categorized as bi-metal, including Silver and Gold. A new element introduced was the inspector's ability to leave a "black mark" by labeling the institution with a "does not recommend" tag if it did not meet the evaluation criteria. Additionally, this season emphasized tasting dishes at restaurants, and the role of Hotels' Examiner remained significant. It was also mandatory to spend the night in the hotel in which the audit was conducted in order to tell whether it was comfortable to sleep in the hotel. But if the apogee of unsanitary conditions took place in the hotel, then this rule could be ignored.

A co-host also appears. This is Аnna Zhizha - the editor-in-chief of the program (from the first to the eighth season (inclusive)). Before becoming a full-fledged co-presenter, she was already the chief editor, but did not appear in the frame.

In the fifth season, the Inspector expanded the scope of inspections to include supermarkets, markets, pump room resorts, and water parks.

== The sixth season ==
The sixth season of the Ukrainian television program Revisor continued the tradition of checking service establishments for the quality of services and compliance with standards. Vadym Abramov remained the host. This season, the Revizor team visited various restaurants, hotels, cafes and other establishments throughout Ukraine to evaluate their work and provide recommendations for improvement.

== The seventh season ==
In the seventh season, Vadim Abramov continued to host the program, but he had a companion who appeared when inspecting supermarkets. This is Natalia Kudriashova - an expert in the progress of supermatkers. She walked around the store hall and looked for substandard goods, spoiled goods and other problems in the sales hall. The season strengthened the position of the TV program as one of the leaders of Ukrainian television.

== The eighth season ==
The eighth season of the Revisor continued the mission of checking service establishments throughout Ukraine. Revizor visited restaurants, hotels, cafes and other places to assess the quality of services and compliance with standards.

Mykola Tyshchenko became the host of this season. Together with him, Anna Zhizha continued her activities.

The feature of this season was the innovation of the seat evaluation system. Special "Revizor`s" scales and 10 balls (5 black, 5 white) were made. When one of the criteria was well adhere - the place will receive one white ball for this criterion. If the standard are not met - a black ball. If the majority of balls are white, then the place receive an award. But, if the criterion of "purity" is worth a red ball, then there is no chance to get a plaque.

== The ninth season ==
The ninth season of the program Revisor continued the mission of checking service establishments throughout Ukraine. Anna Zhizha and Mykola Tyshchenko continued to lead the project.

In the ninth season of the television program Revisor Elena Filonova joined the team, performing the role of Revizor krasy (Ревізор краси). She conducted checks not only on cleanliness and quality of service, but also on compliance of establishments with standards of beauty and health. Unlike the usual Revisor, Elena received pink gloves for checking cleanliness.

== The tenth season ==
The tenth season of Revisor continued to acquaint viewers with the quality of service in various institutions of Ukraine. The program kept its main goal — to independently evaluate service and conditions in hotels, restaurants, cafes and other places of rest.

In this season, Elena Filonova remained, and Yulia Pankova joined, replacing Mykola and Anna.

A feature of the tenth season was not only the audits of institutions, but also the detection of various violations, such as the sale of alcohol to teenagers, the use of fake medical records. These issues once again proved that the Revisor not only informs viewers, but also contributes to improving the quality of service in Ukraine.

Also, this season there was an opportunity - after filming a video review and not getting an award, there is still a chance to get it. For this, representatives of places that have already had an inspection should come to the additional talk show Strastri za Revizorom. There, representatives of places must prove that they have corrected their shortcomings.

== The special season "Quarantine" ==
The special season Quarantine of the TV program Revisor was dedicated to inspections of institutions during the COVID-19 pandemic. Only Yuliya Pankova was the presenter of this season. She and her team visited various facilities to ensure that they were following the sanitary and safety measures imposed due to the quarantine.

The Revisor team was equipped with all the necessary personal protective equipment, including surgical masks, gowns, safety glasses, several pairs of gloves and liter supplies of antiseptics. They were also tested for COVID-19 to ensure safety during filming.

This season, numerous violations were discovered, such as the lack of masks and gloves for workers, insufficient disinfection of food baskets and boxes for ready-made food, which became a breeding ground for bacteria. Special attention was paid to fast food establishments, where gross violations of hygiene were often found.

Revisor. Quarantine not only highlighted problems, but also provided recommendations for improving conditions and observing safety measures. This season has shown how important the responsibility of establishments is in times of a pandemic and how important it is to adhere to high standards of hygiene for the health of consumers.

For this season, there are no additional talk shows Strastri za Revizorom.

== The eleventh season ==
The eleventh season of Revisor continued the mission of checking service establishments throughout Ukraine. The presenter of this season was Yuliya Pankova, who had already proven herself in previous seasons as a thorough and principled auditor.

This season, the Revizor`s team continued to visit restaurants, hotels, cafes and other places to assess the quality of service and compliance with standards.

For this season, there are no additional talk shows Strastri za Revizorom.

== Problems on the set ==
All seasons of the program featured restaurants and hotels trying to thwart the efforts of the inspection team. Some restaurateurs and hotel owners went to great lengths to avoid inspection, such as locking doors, insulting the film crew, and resisting the inspection process in various ways. Their actions were aimed at preventing the "Revisor" from getting to know the details of their institutions.

== Influence in other countries ==
In 2013, the format of Revizor on Novyi Channel TV was acquired by Friday! in Russia, where the program is known as Revizorro and is hosted by Elena Letuchaya (seasons 1–3, 5), Olga Romanovskaya (season 4), Nastasya Samburskaya (season 6–7), Ida Galich (season 7), Ksenia Milas (season 8).

Also in Georgia, a similar project Public Control (სახალხო კონტროლი) was launched.
