= Bitva extrasensov =

Russian tv-show

- Original title: Битва экстрасенсов
- Genre: Reality TV
- Presented by: Mikhail Porechenkov (seasons 1-7); Marat Basharov (season 8-)
- Narrated by: Vsevolod Kuznetsov (from season 5); Dmitry Polonsky (season 6, episode 6; season 8, issues 2 and 8; season 9, issues 2 and 19)
- Country of origin: Russia
- Original language: Russian

Production
- Running time: 50-75 minutes
- Production company: LLC "Kefir production"

Original release
- Release: 25 February 2007 – present

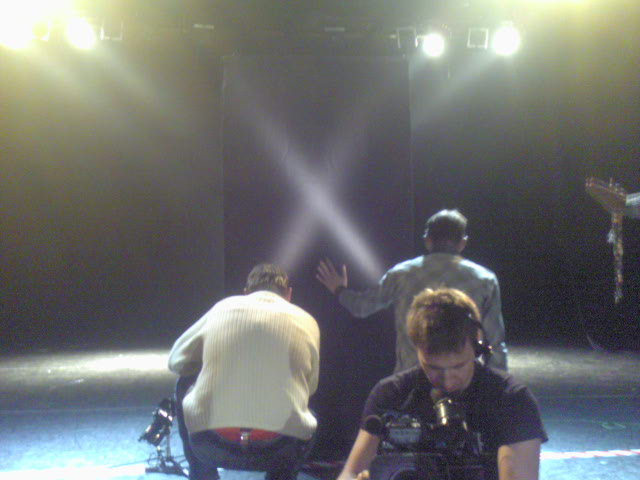
Battle of the psychics

Battle of the Psychics (Russian: Битва экстрасенсов, romanized: Bitva extrasensov) is a Russian paranormal reality television series broadcast on TNT. Based on the British format Britain's Psychic Challenge, the show premiered its first season on February 25, 2007.

Similar adaptations of the format have been produced internationally, including: Australia (The One), Azerbaijan (Ekstra hiss), Bulgaria ("Ясновидци"), Estonia (Selgeltnägijate tuleproov), Georgia (Ekstrasensta Brdzola – ექსტრასენსთა ბრძოლა), Israel (Reality Koah – "Power"), Kazakhstan (Qıl kópіr), Latvia (Ekstrasensu cīņas), Lithuania (Ekstrasensų mūšis), Mongolia (Зөн билгийн тулаан), Ukraine (Bytva ekstrasensiv), and U.S. (America's Psychic Challenge).

One of the creators, Vladislav Severtsev, participated in the producing of the 2017 film The Bride.

== Seasons ==
Season	Beginning of the season	Finals	Winner		Finalists						Leading	Number of participants	Source
Season	Beginning of the season	Finals	Winner		2nd place		3rd place		4th place		Leading	Number of participants	Source
1	25.02.2007	22.04.2007	Natalia Vorotnikova	86,61 %	Natalia Nosacheva †	7,62 %	Pyotr Sobolev	5,77 %	There were only three finalists in 1-2 seasons		Mikhail Porechenkov	9	
2	27.05.2007	15.07.2007	Zuliya Rajabova	38,07 %	Leonid Konovalov	37,52 %	Maxim Vorotnikov	24,41 %	There were only three finalists in 1-2 seasons		Mikhail Porechenkov	8	
3	30.09.2007	16.12.2007	Mehdi Ebragimi Wafa	53,8 %	Alexey Fad †	32,1 %	Sulu Iskander	12,7 %	Victoria Zheleznova	1,4 %	Mikhail Porechenkov	10	
4	10.02.2008	13.04.2008	Tursunoy Zakirova †	73 %	Roman Fad	14 %	Aza Petrenko	12 %	There were only three finalists in 4-10 seasons		Mikhail Porechenkov	9	
5	11.05.2008	20.07.2008	Liliya Hegai	77 %	Irik Sadykov	22 %	Yulia Solovyova	1 %	There were only three finalists in 4-10 seasons		Mikhail Porechenkov	10	
6	28.09.2008	21.12.2008	Alexander Litvin	62 %	Ziraddin Rzayev	34 %	Kazhetta Akhmetzhanova	4 %	There were only three finalists in 4-10 seasons		Mikhail Porechenkov	10	
7	19.04.2009	12.07.2009	Alexey Pokhabov	64 %	Ilona Novoselova †	35 %	Bakhyt Zhumatova	1 %	There were only three finalists in 4-10 seasons		Mikhail Porechenkov	9	
8	11.10.2009	27.12.2009	Vladimir Muranov	45 %	Dilaram Saparova	44 %	Galina Bagirova	11 %	There were only three finalists in 4-10 seasons		Marat Basharov	9	
9	12.03.2010	04.06.2010	Natalia Banteeva	78,6 %	Nonna Khidiryan	17,5 %	Valentin Divin	3,9 %	There were only three finalists in 4-10 seasons		Marat Basharov	9	
10	24.09.2010	17.12.2010	Mohsen Noruzi	79 %	Elena Lyulyakova	15 %	Tatiana Karakhanova	6 %	There were only three finalists in 4-10 seasons		Marat Basharov	10	
11	08.04.2011	01.07.2011	Vitaly Gibert	91,37 %	Victoria Saturday	5,85 %	Vlad Kadoni	1,97 %	Anika Sokolskaya	0,81 %	Marat Basharov	10	
12	07.10.2011	30.12.2011	Elena Yasevich †	50,8 %	Anatoly Ledenev	44,4 %	Victoria Komakhina	4,8 %	There were only three finalists in season 12		Marat Basharov	10	
13	03.08.2012	28.12.2012	Dmitry Volkhov	66,3 %	Elena Golunova	25,3 %	Vit Mano	5,5 %	Fatima Khadueva	2,9 %	Marat Basharov	13	
14	22.09.2013	29.12.2013	Alexander Sheps	88 %	Marilyn Kerro	9,7 %	Ekaterina Ryzhikova	1,7 %	Danis Glinstein	0,6 %	Marat Basharov	12	
15	20.09.2014	27.12.2014	Julia Wang	78,5 %	Tatiana Larina	19,9 %	Ekaterina Borisova	1,12 %	Arseny Karadzha	0,48 %	Marat Basharov	12	
16	19.09.2015	26.12.2015	Victoria Raidos	50,8 %	Marilyn Kerro	47,4 %	Nicole Kuznetsova	1,8 %	There were only three finalists in season 16		Marat Basharov	11	
17	03.09.2016	24.12.2016	Swami Dasha	53,5 %	Marilyn Kerro	36,3 %	Nadezhda Shevchenko	5,7 %	Daria Voskoboeva †	4,5 %	Marat Basharov	13	
18	23.09.2017	23.12.2017	Konstantin Getsati	53 %	Sonya Egorova	21 %	Alexander Kinzhin	17 %	Jean and Dana Alibekov	9 %	Marat Basharov	12	
19	22.09.2018	22.12.2018	Timofey Rudenko	45,13 %	Aida Grifal	27,92 %	Grigory Kuznetsov	26,95 %	There were only three finalists in season 19		Marat Basharov	12	
20	28.09.2019	28.12.2019	Dmitry Matveev	33,5 %	Mariam Tsimintia	32,5 %	Wilma Heinrich	18,5 %	Irina Ignatenko	15,5 %	Marat Basharov	13	
21	26.09.2020	26.12.2020	Oleg Sheps	82,73 %	Mariana Romanova	8,7 %	Maxim Rapoport	4,44 %	Maxim Fedorov	4,09 %	Marat Basharov	12	
22	25.09.2021	25.12.2021	Maxim Levin	45,5 %	Vladislav Cherevaty	31,5 %	Olga Yakubovich	16 %	Linda Heward-Mills	7 %	Marat Basharov	12	
23	10.09.2022	24.12.2022	Vladislav Cherevaty	59,4 %	Lina Jebisashvili	24,4 %	Angelina Izosimova	16,2 %	There were only three finalists in season 23		Marat Basharov	12	
24	23.03.2024	22.06.2024	Artem Krasnov	60,4%	Maxim Levin	15,2%	Lisa Petrova	13,7%	Alexander Sakov	10,7%	Marat Basharov	13	

=== Twenty-fourth season (2024) ===
Psychics	Releases													
Psychics	1	2	3	4	5	6	7	8	9	10	11	12	13	14
Artem Krasnov	Casting	Passed	Passed	Passed	Best	Passed	Best	Best	Best	Passed	Best	Passed	Final test	1st place
Maxim Levin		Best	Passed	Passed	Passed	Passed	Passed	Passed	Passed	Best	Passed	Passed	Final test	2nd place
Lisa Petrova	Casting	Passed	Best	Passed	Passed	Best	Passed	Passed	Passed	Best	Passed	Passed	Final test	3rd place
Alexander Sakov	Casting	Passed	Passed	Passed	Passed	Passed	Passed	Passed	Passed	Passed	Passed	Passed	Final test	4th place
Samantha and Patricia	Casting	Passed	Passed	Passed	Passed	Passed	Passed	Passed	Passed	Dropped out	5th place			
Tamara Hala	Casting	Passed	Passed	Passed	Passed	Passed	Passed	Passed	Dropped out	6th place				
Nicole Kuznetsova	Came back	Passed	Passed	Best	Passed	Passed	Passed	Dropped out	7th place					
Irina Singing	Casting	Passed	Passed	Passed	Passed	Passed	Dropped out	8th place						
Vitaly Rozhkov	Casting	Passed	Passed	Passed	Passed	Dropped out	9th place							
Artie	Casting	Passed	Passed	Passed	Dropped out	10th place								
Zhenya Shulik	Casting	Passed	Passed	Dropped out	11th place									
Denis Alatortsev	Casting	Passed	Dropped out	12th place										
Molly	Casting	Dropped out	13th place											

The psychic won
The psychic took 2nd place
The psychic took 3rd place
The psychic took 4th place
The psychic passed the final test
The psychic made it to the final
The psychic got into the 'white envelope' and became the best of the week
The psychic went further
The psychic got into the 'black envelope', but stayed in the project.
The psychic got into the 'black envelope', but fought in a duel and stayed in the project
The psychic hit the 'black envelope', but fought in a duel and lost
The psychic got into the 'black envelope' and left the project
The psychic left the project at his own request
The psychic is back in the project
The psychic passed the casting
The psychic was absent from the project
