= Aleksandra Rebenok =

Russian actress and television presenter

- Born: Aleksandra Vyacheslavovna Rebenok; January 28, 1980 (age 45); Moscow, RSFSR, USSR
- Occupation: Actress
- Years active: 2003–present
- Spouse: Alexey Vertkov
- Awards: Golden Eagle Award (2024).

Aleksandra Vyacheslavovna Rebenok (Russian: Алекса́ндра Вячесла́вовна Ребено́к; born May 6, 1980, Moscow, RSFSR, USSR) is a Russian actress of theater, cinema and television presenter.

== Biography ==
Was born May 6, 1980, in Moscow in the family of the candidate physical and mathematical sciences and technologies and designer clothes. In 1994 she graduated from the Children's Art School number 1. In 1997, she graduated from the educational complex (named after Galina Vishnevskaya) in piano. From 1997 to 1999 she studied at the Moscow State Art and Cultural University, graduated from the 2nd year on the director's faculty on a specialty the director of the theater.

In 2003, she graduated from the Boris Shchukin Theatre Institute, where its artistic director was Rodion Ovchinnikov. Ccollaborated with the Strastnoi Theater Center from 2003 to 2005. In 2005, leading to the O2TV Channel.

In 2005-2006 she studied at the Faculty of Journalism at Moscow State University.

Since 2006 - the actress Theater.doc. Since 2008 he collaborates with The Project Factory. In 2010, he starred in the TV series School (Valeriya Gai Germanika) and J-Factory (Chris Waitt).

In 2011, it became the leading program Face Lifting. Russian Version on Muz-TV adaptation of British show Snog Marry Avoid? on BBC Three.

== Selected filmography ==
- Dismissal (2004)
- Alice's Dream (2007)
- Glukhar (2008)
- Bride at any Cost (2009)
- Trace (2009)
- J-Factory (2010)
- Kulagin and partners (2010)
- School (2010)
- Till Night Do Us Part (2011)
- Goodbye, Mama (2013)
- Brothers Ch (2014)
- Island (2016)
- The Bride (2017)
- Acid (2018)
- Dead Lake (2019)
- Gold Diggers (2019)
- 1993 (2023)
