= Bytva ekstrasensiv =

- Битва екстрасенсів
- Created by: Channel 5 (UK)
- Directed by: Oleksander Slobodskyi; Vira Briskorn; Yulia Fedets
- Presented by: Pavlo Kostitsyn
- Judges: Pavlo Kostitsyn; Olena Kurylova; Hayal Alekperov; Sisco Gomez; Uri Geller; Dana Borisova
- Country of origin: Ukraine
- Original languages: Ukrainian, Russian
- No. of series: broadcast 21 season

Production
- Producers: Victoria Barskova; Denys Snizhko; Oleksander Slobodskyi; Yulia Fedets
- Editors: Oleksiy Udovytskyi; Yulia Fedets
- Camera setup: Multi-camera

Original release
- Network: STB
- Release: 28 October 2007 – present

Related
- Britain's Psychic Challenge

Bytva ekstrasensiv (Ukrainian: Битва екстрасенсів) is a reality TV series on the STB network in Ukraine. The show originated in the UK with the title Britain's Psychic Challenge. The first release of the first season was aired on October 28, 2007. It is now airing its 21st season.

Such programs show in the USA (America's Psychic Challenge), Azerbaijan (Ekstra hiss), RF (Битва экстрасенсов), Australia (The One), Kazakhstan (Qıl köpіr), Lithuania (Ekstrasensų mūšis), Estonia (Selgeltnägijate tuleproov), and Latvia (Ekstrasensu cīņas).

== Series overviews ==
Season	Participants	Episodes	Duration dates	Participants	
Season	Participants	Episodes	Duration dates	Winner	Finalists
1st	9	10	October 28 – December 30, 2007	Anatoliy Shevchenko	Dmytro Novakov, Anna Belaya, Nadia Pavlyk
2nd	10	11	March 9 – May 18, 2008	Yehor Minin	Svitlana Dovhal, Natalia Kovalenko
3rd	13	13	October 26, 2008 – January 18, 2009	Serhiy Kolesnichenko	Yuriy Kozlov, Inna Halinova, Zhanna Ramazanova
4th	7	9	April 19 – June 14, 2009	Serhiy Lavrentyuk	Daryna Sukha, Ihor Kosobrodov
5th	10	10	September 13 – November 15, 2009	Zhanna Shulakova	Mahdalena Mochiovski, Yaroslava Fedoroda
6th	14	15	February 21 – May 30, 2010	Olena Kurylova	Andriy Shelukhin, Renata Sihi, Oleksander Chadayev
7th	12	13	October 17, 2010 – January 9, 2011	Hayal Alekperov	Sabuhi Imanov, Anna Galliers
8th	13	13	March 6 – May 29, 2011	Olena Kurylova	Viktor Aleksandrovskiy, Maya Dzidzishvili, Diana Clerk
9th	12	13	October 2 – December 25, 2011	Ilmira Derbentseva	Ilona Kaldre, Halina Pališčuk
10th	12	13	March 11 – May 20, 2012	Hayal Alekperov	Anna Galliers, Viktor Aleksandrovskiy
11th	12	13	October 7 – December 30, 2012	June Field	Roman Latynin, Jayc Ryder, Tonya Melendez
12th	12	13	October 6 – December 31, 2013	Dilaram Saparova	Benedikt Lafleur, Valentina Lychahina, Salavat Imongaliev
13th	12	13	March 9 – June 1, 2014	Olena Stetsenko	Yakov Shneerson, Sofia Lytvynova
14th	12	13	October 5 – December 28, 2014	Julie McKenzie	Rubina Tsybulskaya, Halyna Pototska
15th	12	13	October 4 – December 27, 2015	Yana Pasynkova	Helen Bright, Svitlana Movchan
16th	12	13	October 2 – December 25, 2016	Suren Dzhulakyan	Olha Stohnushenko, Theodora, Olha Voloshyna
17th	12	13	October 1 – December 24, 2017	Olha Yankovska	Anna Yefremova, Anton Grechishnikov, Kheldis
18th	12	13	March 11 – June 3, 2018	Кain Kramer	Yevhen Medovshchikov, Fekla
19th	12	13	October 7 – December 30, 2018	Nicholas Petrosyan	Anna Arjevanidze, Saga Bjorn, Alexandra Chornomorska
20th	12	13	October 10-December 12, 2019	Arman Cybulsky	
21st	12	13	2021	Hala Alekperova	

== Season 15 ==
Participants	Episodes												
Participants	1st (4 Oct)	2nd (11 Oct)	3rd (18 Oct)	4th (25 Oct)	5th (1 Nov)	6th (8 Nov)	7th (15 Nov)	8th (22 Nov)	9th (29 Nov)	10th (6 Dec)	11th (13 Dec)	12th (20 Dec)	13th (27 Dec)
Helen Bright (UK)		Strong					Strong			Strong	Strong		
Yana Pasynkova (Ukraine)			Strong			Strong			Strong				🏆
Svitlana Movchan (Ukraine)				Strong									
Andriy Satanenko (Ukraine)											Weak		
Paulino Martínez (Mexico)			Strong							Weak			
Elyzaveta Serdyuk (Ukraine)									Weak				
Sebastian Balsön (France)							Weak						
Nadzieja Varabiej (Belarus)						Weak							
Jerzy Kopczyński (Poland)					Weak								
Inna Dovhan (Ukraine)				Weak									
Vladyslav Hrytsay (Ukraine)			Weak										
Yulia Katsman (Kazakhstan)		Weak											

== Season 16 ==
Participants	Episodes												
Participants	1st (2 Oct)	2nd (9 Oct)	3rd (16 Oct)	4th (23 Oct)	5th (30 Oct)	6th (6 Nov)	7th (13 Nov)	8th (20 Nov)	9th (27 Nov)	10th (4 Dec)	11th (11 Dec)	12th (18 Dec)	13th (25 Dec)
Theodora (Ukraine)		Strong								Strong			
Olha Stohnushenko (Ukraine)			Strong								Strong		
Suren Dzhulakyan (Armenia)						Strong	Strong						🏆
Olha Voloshyna (Ukraine)								Strong					
Vieliena Karmyzova (Belarus)				Strong					Strong	Weak			
Rafail Brazheyev (Greece)									Weak				
Helena Johannessen (Norway)					Strong			Weak					
Ivana Staneva (Bulgaria)							Weak						
King Kwa Zulu (South Africa)						Weak							
Alisa Sheremetyeva (Ukraine)				Weak									
Nguyễn Trung Đức (Ukraine)			Weak										
Daryna Kupina & Kostyantyn Sosyura (Ukraine)		Weak											

== Season 17 ==
Participants	Episodes												
Participants	1st (1 Oct)	2nd (8 Oct)	3rd (15 Oct)	4th (22 Oct)	5th (29 Oct)	6th (5 Nov)	7th (12 Nov)	8th (19 Nov)	9th (26 Nov)	10th (3 Dec)	11th (10 Dec)	12th (17 Dec)	13th (24 Dec)
Olha Yankovska (Ukraine)			Strong				Strong		Strong		Strong		🏆
Anna Yefremova (Ukraine)		Strong									Strong		
Anton Grechishnikov (Belarus)				Strong									
Kheldis (Ukraine)										Strong			
Lilia Nohr (Germany)								Strong		Weak			
Adinath Jayadhar (India)					Strong				Weak				
Daryna Frein (Ukraine)								Weak					
Diana Krechun & Ispanka Stanku (Ukraine)							Weak						
Ivan Kuleba (Ukraine)					Weak								
Diar Aşkenazi (Kyrgyzstan)				Weak									
Leonid Orlan (Ukraine)			Weak										
Valeria Sprut (Ukraine)		Weak											

== Season 18 ==
Participants	Episodes												
Participants	1st (11 Mar)	2nd (18 Mar)	3rd (25 Mar)	4th (1 Apr)	5th (8 Apr)	6th (15 Apr)	7th (22 Apr)	8th (29 Apr)	9th (6 May)	10th (13 May)	11th (20 May)	12th (27 May)	13th (3 Jun)
Кain Kramer (Ukraine)			Strong			Strong					Strong		🏆
Fekla (Ukraine)				Strong						Strong			
Yevhen Medovshchikov (Ukraine)					Strong				Strong				
Svetlana Pavlyuk (Ukraine)								Strong			Weak		
Seirash (Ukraine)						Strong				Weak			
Anar (Kazakhstan)		Strong							Weak				
Katerina Lyakhova (Ukraine)								Weak					
Ilona Nemet (Ukraine)						Weak							
Avo (Ukraine)					Weak								
Alla Grinyuk (Ukraine)				Weak									
Bella (Ukraine)			Weak										
Velemudr and Velesar (Ukraine)		Weak											

== Season 19 ==
Participants	Episodes												
Participants	1st (7 Oct)	2nd (14 Oct)	3rd (21 Oct)	4th (28 Oct)	5th (4 Nov)	6th (11 Nov)	7th (18 Nov)	8th (25 Nov)	9th (2 Dec)	10th (9 Dec)	11th (16 Dec)	12th (23 Dec)	13th (30 Dec)
Saga Bjorn (Helena Johannessen) (Norway)	Casting	Strong					Strong						
Anna Arjevanidze (Georgia)	Casting			Strong				Strong					
Alexandra Chornomorska (Ukraine)	Casting		Strong		Strong								
Nicholas Petrosyan (Armenia)	Casting					Strong			Strong				🏆
Twiggy (Ukraine)	Casting										Weak		
Alexander Solyanik (Ukraine)	Casting								Weak				
Nargiz Hanum (Turkey)	Casting						Weak						
Olesya Sichkar (Ukraine)	Casting					Weak							
Roma and Lesya (Ukraine)	Casting					Weak							
Ksana (Ukraine)	Casting			Weak									
Yaroslav Andersen (Ukraine)	Casting		Weak										
Mairis (Latvia)	Casting	Weak											
