= Revizorro =

- Created by: Viktoria Burdukova
- Presented by: Elena Letuchaya (seasons 1-3, 5); Olga Romanovskaya (season 4); Nastasya Samburskaya (seasons 6–7); Ida Galich (season 7); Ksenia Milas (season 8)
- Country of origin: Russia
- Original language: Russian
- No. of seasons: 9
- No. of episodes: 180

Production
- Producers: Nikita Chisnikov, Elena Shipunova, Elena Letuchaya
- Production location: Russia
- Running time: 48–50 minutes
- Production companies: Raiting TV+ Friday TV

Original release
- Network: Friday!
- Release: 4 June 2014 – 1 May 2021

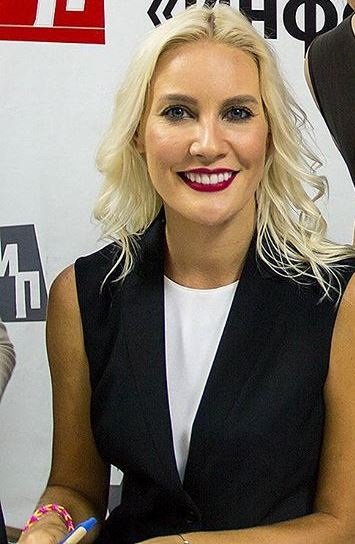
Elena Letuchaya, initial host of the show.

Revizorro (Russian: Ревизорро) is a Russian television show in a documentary format distributed by the Friday! network. The first episode aired in June 2014, coinciding with the birthday of the TV network. Initially hosted by a Russian TV presenter Elena Letuchaya, before being substituted by the singer Olga Romanovskaya in April 2016. The program is a Russian adaptation of the Ukrainian show Revizor.

== About ==
"Revizorro" is a television program by "Friday!" that reviews various public facilities: hotels, hostels, restaurants, cafes, clubs, water parks and other public places that provide all sorts of services to their visitors. Filming of the first episode in Stavropol began in February 2014.

Residents of various cities can leave reviews of their local business establishments on the Friday! TV channel website. Based on these reviews, the staff of "Revizorro" makes a list of potential places to review. The crew shows up at a business establishment without a warning so that the staff cannot prepare for their visit. It then allows the viewers honest description of all the pros and cons of the establishments being evaluated. Many episodes also show patrons of the restaurants who use the services, check the quality of food, and cleanliness of the premises, instead of the host herself.

The owners of the audited businesses often offer money to Revizorro's employees so that they will warn them about the crew's visit or promote their businesses in a more favorable light. However, the program officials reject such proposals, stressing how the purpose of the program is in its impartial review of an establishment.

== Host ==
Seasons	Host	Age
1	Elena Letuchaya	from 2014 to April 2016
2	Elena Letuchaya	from 2014 to April 2016
3	Elena Letuchaya	from 2014 to April 2016
4	Olga Romanovskaya	2016
5	Elena Letuchaya	2016
6	Nastasya Samburskaya	from 2017 to 2019
7	Nastasya Samburskaya	from 2017 to 2019
7	Ida Galich	2019
8	Ksenia Milas	2019

== See also ==
- Elena Letuchaya, a Russian journalist, television presenter, producer and director.
- Olga Romanovskaya, a Ukrainian singer, TV-host and producer,
