= Baba Yaga: Terror of the Dark Forest =

Russian supernatural horror film

- Theatrical release poster
- Directed by: Svyatoslav Podgayevsky
- Written by: Natalya Dubovaya; Svyatoslav Podgaevsky; Ivan Kapitonov
- Produced by: Ivan Kapitonov; Svyatoslav Podrigovski; Alexander Rodnyansky; Sergey Melkumov; Vadim Vereshchagin; Rafael Minasbekyan; Inna Lepetikova; Natalya Dubovaya
- Starring: Oleg Chugunov; Glafira Golubeva; Artyom Zhigulin; Svetlana Ustinova; Maryana Spivak; Aleksey Rozin
- Cinematography: Anton Zenkovich
- Edited by: Anton Komrakov
- Music by: Nick Skachkov
- Production companies: Non-Stop Production; QS Films
- Distributed by: Central Partnership
- Release date: February 27, 2020
- Running time: 97 minutes
- Country: Russia
- Language: Russian
- Budget: 80 million RUB
- Box office: 75 million RUB ($956.197)n

Baba Yaga: Terror of the Dark Forest (Russian: Яга. Кошмар тёмного леса, romanized: Yaga. Koshmar tyomnogo lesa) is a 2020 Russian fantasy horror film based on the Slavic tale of Baba Yaga. The film was directed by Svyatoslav Podgayevsky about a strange nanny who looks after the youngest daughter in a family that moved to the outskirts of the city, the film stars Oleg Chugunov, Glafira Golubeva, Artyom Zhigulin, Svetlana Ustinova, Maryana Spivak and Aleksey Rozin.

The film was released in Russia on February 27, 2020. The distributor is Central Partnership.

== Plot ==
The film centers on a young family that moves to a new apartment in the outskirts of the big city. The nanny they hired to look after their newborn daughter quickly becomes trustworthy. However, the eldest boy, Egor, notices the frightening behavior of the woman, but his parents do not believe him. The surveillance cameras installed by his father for reassurance only confirm that everything is in order.

One day, Egor returns home and does not find any traces of either the nanny or his little sister. His parents seem to be in a strange trance and do not even remember that they have ever had a daughter. Then Egor together with his friends arranges a search, during which they find out that the disappeared nanny is actually an ancient Slavic demonic witch known as Baba Yaga.

== Cast ==
- Oleg Chugunov as Egor
- Glafira Golubeva as Dasha
- Artyom Zhigulin as Anton
- Svetlana Ustinova as Tatyana, nanny / Baba Yaga
- Maryana Spivak as Yuliya, stepmother
- Aleksey Rozin as Alexey, father
- Igor Khripunov as Mrachnyy
- Marta Timofeeva as Seta
- Evgeniya Evstigneeva as Egor's mother
- Olga Makeeva as Dasha's mother
- Ilya Ludin as Micha

== Production ==
Baba Yaga: Terror of the Dark Forest will go to the United States and Latin America - Ledafilms acquired all rights, including movie theater rental, in these territories. The film will also be released in Vietnam & Indonesia (CGV), Malaysia (GSC), Singapore (Purple Plan), Taiwan (GaragePlay) & Hong Kong (mm2 Entertainment) and other countries in Southeast Asia (Suraya Filem), Japan (IPA Asia) and the Baltic States (Garsu).

=== Filming ===
Principal photography in April to June 2018 in Mozhaysky District, Moscow, the Skolkovo Innovation Center.

== Release ==
The film was released in Russia by Central Partnership on February 27, 2020, and the world premiere of March 1, 2020.
