= Konstantinopol =

2025 Russian historical drama television series

- Genre: Historical drama Historical mystery
- Written by: Alexey Mizgyryov; Vladlen Maksimov; Anastasia Maksimova
- Directed by: Sergey Chekalov
- Starring: Aleksandr Ustyugov; Oksana Akinshina; Sergey Marin; Kirill Käro; Wolfgang Cerny; Vyacheslav Chepurchenko; Ksenia Treister
- Theme music composer: Alexander Vartanov
- Country of origin: Russia
- Original language: Russian
- No. of seasons: 1
- No. of episodes: 10

Production
- Executive producer: Ksenia Sokolova
- Producers: Yulia Sumacheva; Timur Weinstein
- Cinematography: Stanislav Sharkov
- Editor: Andrey Malashenkov
- Running time: 50–53 minutes
- Production company: White Media

Original release
- Network: IVI; NTV
- Release: 30 October – 30 October 2025

Konstantinopol (Russian: Константинополь, lit. 'Constantinople') is a Russian historical drama television series about the fate of Russian émigrés in the 1920s. The working title of the project was Outcasts (Russian: Изгои).

The series was produced by White Media with the support of the Internet Development Institute.

All ten episodes premiered digitally on the streaming platform IVI on October 30, 2025. The television premiere took place on NTV on November 3, 2025.

== Plot ==
In November 1920, White Army officer Sergey Neratov arrives in Constantinople together with the surviving soldiers of Wrangel's Army, Russian aristocrats, doctors, and merchants. All of them find themselves outcasts in a foreign land.

In order to survive, men cross legal boundaries, while women abandon their former moral codes. Lonely and having lost his homeland, family, and purpose in life, Neratov becomes one of the leaders of the Russian White émigré community.

== Cast ==
=== Main cast ===
- Aleksandr Ustyugov as Sergey Lvovich Neratov
- Oksana Akinshina as Ekaterina Nikolaevna Dikova, Baroness
- Sergey Marin as Pyotr Petrovich Sablin, merchant
- Kirill Käro as Borodaevsky, physician
- Wolfgang Cerny as Kirpit (Pavel Andreyevich Kirpichyov / Pyotr Andreyevich Kirpichyov), boxer
- Vyacheslav Chepurchenko as Remnev (Antonio Navarra), gigolo
- Ksenia Treister as Serafima Petrovna Sablina
- Aidan Hasanzade as Belgin, hospital nurse
- Samimi Farhadov as Güler, senior migration inspector
- Mark Benjamin Pukh as Gulliver, Irish dock worker
- Dirk Martens as Tirpitz, banker
- Abdulghani Aliyev as Turgut, chief hospital physician
- Ilgar Musayev as Kutlug, police captain
- Kyamran Agabalayev as Altan

=== Supporting cast ===
- Martin John Cook as Colonel Knoxveld, military commandant of Constantinople
- Sanan Alizade as Nusret, migration inspector
- Valery Storozhik as Prince Konstantin Alexandrovich Read
- Alexey Varushchenko as Dolotov, Russian officer
- Rovshan Kerimdukht as boarding house owner
- Ilya Yakubovsky as Prince Andrey Konstantinovich Read
- Pierre Bourel as Pierre, French microbiologist
- Javidan Novruzov as Omar, pimp
- Yuliya Vitruk as Lyuska Makovskaya, prostitute
- Azamat Nigmanov as Ulagay, mercenary
- Karen Badalov as Abram Sado

== Production ==
The screenplay was written in 2017, but production was suspended due to insufficient funding.

Filming took place from April to October 2024 in Moscow, Saint Petersburg, Vyborg, and Baku.

The streets of Baku were used as stand-ins for Constantinople.

Historical and military consultants worked on the production.

On June 19, 2025, the series opened the 7th Pilot Television Series Festival in Ivanovo.
