= Vyacheslav Chepurchenko =

Russian actor

- Вячеслав Чепурченко
- Born: Vyacheslav Yuryevich Chepurchenko; July 29, 1987; Rostov-on-Don, Russian SFSR, Soviet Union
- Occupation: Actor
- Years active: 2009–present
- Employer: Moscow Oleg Tabakov Theatre

Vyacheslav Yuryevich Chepurchenko (Russian: Вячесла́в Ю́рьевич Чепурче́нко; born July 29, 1987) is a Russian theatre, film, and television actor.

== Biography ==
=== Early life ===
Chepurchenko was born on July 29, 1987, in Rostov-on-Don. Soon after, his family moved to Kamyshin, Volgograd Oblast. His mother, Irina Igorevna Chepurchenko (née Zezerova), is an actress who worked for eleven years with the Kamyshin Drama Theatre troupe.

He was raised primarily by his mother and grandparents. He attended secondary schools No. 4 and No. 14 in Kamyshin. During his school years, he sang, danced, played sports, and hosted school events, although he was an average student academically.

After graduating from school, he initially planned to join the Russian Ministry of Emergency Situations. However, after visiting an open day at the Saratov State Conservatory, he was noticed by People's Artist of the RSFSR and theatre pedagogue Alexander Galko, who encouraged him to pursue acting. Chepurchenko passed the entrance exams with the highest possible score.

In 2005, he enrolled in the Theatre Institute of the Saratov State Conservatory named after L. V. Sobinov and graduated in 2009 with a degree in dramatic theatre and film acting (class of Alexander Galko and Artyom Kuzin). During his studies, he performed on the stage of the Saratov Academic Drama Theatre named after I. A. Slonov.

In 2008, he was awarded the Oleg Tabakov Named Scholarship for academic excellence.

=== Career ===
In 2009, after graduating, Chepurchenko joined the troupe of the Moscow Theatre-Studio under the direction of Oleg Tabakov (now the Moscow Oleg Tabakov Theatre). His debut role was Slavik in Wolves and Sheep, directed by Konstantin Bogomolov.

He later performed leading and supporting roles in numerous productions, including Confessions of Felix Krull, Twelfth Night, The Seagull, The Tempest, and My Fair Lady. Alongside theatre work, he has appeared extensively in television series and films, with over 45 screen projects.

In 2020, Chepurchenko participated in season seven of the television show Ice Age, partnered with Olympic champion Tatyana Totmyanina and later with world championship medalist Yana Khokhlova. He finished as the silver medalist and subsequently toured Russia with ice shows produced by Ilya Averbukh.

=== Personal life ===
Chepurchenko has been married twice. His first marriage ended shortly after being registered in 2017. In 2019, he married Ekaterina Chepurchenko. They have two children: daughter Yaroslava (born 2019) and son Timofey (born 2021).

== Theatre ==
=== Saratov Academic Drama Theatre ===
- Running Away from Love by Lope de Vega (2007) — Carlos
- The Poor Bride by Alexander Ostrovsky (2008) — Merich
- Four Meetings (2009) — Train Driver

=== Moscow Oleg Tabakov Theatre ===
- Wolves and Sheep (2009) — Slavik
- The Marriage of Figaro (2009) — Cherubino
- Confessions of Felix Krull (2010) — Felix Krull
- Twelfth Night (2013) — Sebastian
- Madame Bovary (2014) — Leon
- The Seagull (2014) — Semyon Medvedenko
- My Fair Lady (2019) — Freddy Eynsford-Hill

== Filmography ==
=== Film and television ===
- 2011 – Pyatnitsky (episode 10, “Duty”) – Vasily Donskoy, son of a fallen district police officer
- 2012 – The Cart (short film) – He
- 2012 – Through My Eyes – Alyosha Kazantsev
- 2012 – Mosgaz – Yurkov, sergeant, district police inspector
- 2013 – Farewell – Alexander Lindt, pop star
- 2013 – Weekend – Max, car thief
- 2013 – Summer Holidays – Denis, musician and poet
- 2014 – Demons – Erkel, artillery ensign
- 2014 – Goodbye, My Love! – Leonid Suprunov, lawyer
- 2015 – Infidelity – Vyacheslav “Slava” Salnikov, Asya's lover, student, son of oligarch Oleg Salnikov
- 2015 – A Look from the Past – Pyotr Lebedkin, detective
- 2015 – The Young Guard – Oleg Koshevoy, one of the leaders of the Soviet underground resistance organization
- 2015 – These Eyes Opposite – Valery Obodzinsky (young years)
- 2015 – City – Yasha “Gypsy” (Yakov Ilyin)
- 2016 – Anna Detective (episode “The Night Guest”) – Kireev
- 2016 – A Normal Life (short film) – Dmitry
- 2016 – Paradise Corner – Petya Nagibin
- 2017 – The Nail (short film) – Playboy
- 2017 – The Bride – Ivan
- 2017 – Different Blood – Gustav
- 2017 – Happiness from Shards – Kirill Soloukhin
- 2017 – Sleeping – Sasha Terekhov, blogger
- 2017 – Wings of Empire – Girs, fellow student of Kirill Kirsanov-Dvinsky
- 2017 – Bad Daughter – Andrey Perepechko
- 2017 – Living Until Love – Alexey Govorov
- 2018 – Gurzuf – Yasha “Gypsy”, thief
- 2018 – Witnesses (segment “The Violin”) – Kurt
- 2019 – Idol – Nikolai Berezin (“Niber”), black market trader
- 2019 – How Long Does Love Live – Alexander
- 2019 – Shorter – Igor
- 2019 – Diplomat – Roman Rozhkov
- 2019 – Unfinished Fight – Junior lieutenant
- 2019 – Moms of Champions – Mitya Petrov, diver
- 2019 – Zuki – Nikita Davydov, programmer and IT teacher
- 2020 – Wolf – Yuri
- 2020 – Plague! – William, messenger
- 2020 – Plague! Second Wave – William, messenger
- 2020 – Crazy New Year – William, messenger
- 2020 – Grand (season 4) – Andrey Bykovsky, actor
- 2020 – Retrial – Pyotr Kononenko, car thief
- 2021 – Ghost – Andrey Fyodorov, hacker
- 2021 – The Finder 6 (episode 16) – Anton “Evil”, video blogger
- 2022 – Holms – (in production)
- 2022 – Holidays – Seryozha
- 2022 – The Whirlpool – Sergey
- 2022 – More Fun Together – Roman
- 2023 – Trader – Slava
- 2023 – GDR – Kirill Alikin, journalist
- 2023 – Sex. Before and After – Slava, bartender
- 2023 – Turning Up the Heat – Vladimir
- 2023 – Summer in the City – Pavel
- 2023 – Funny Story – Peter the Great
- 2024 – The Games – Vitaly Timoshkin
- 2024 – Helping the Ex – German
- 2024 – Divorce of Convenience – Andrey
- 2025 – Cynics – Anton Lebedev, yoga instructor
- 2025 – Konstantinopol – Remnev (Antonio Navarra)

== Television ==
- Ice Age (2020) — contestant, runner-up
- Celebrities in Africa (2022) — contestant, 5th place
- Krug (2025) — host
- Chase (2025) — host
