= Olha Freimut =

Ukrainian journalist and model

- Ольга Фреймут
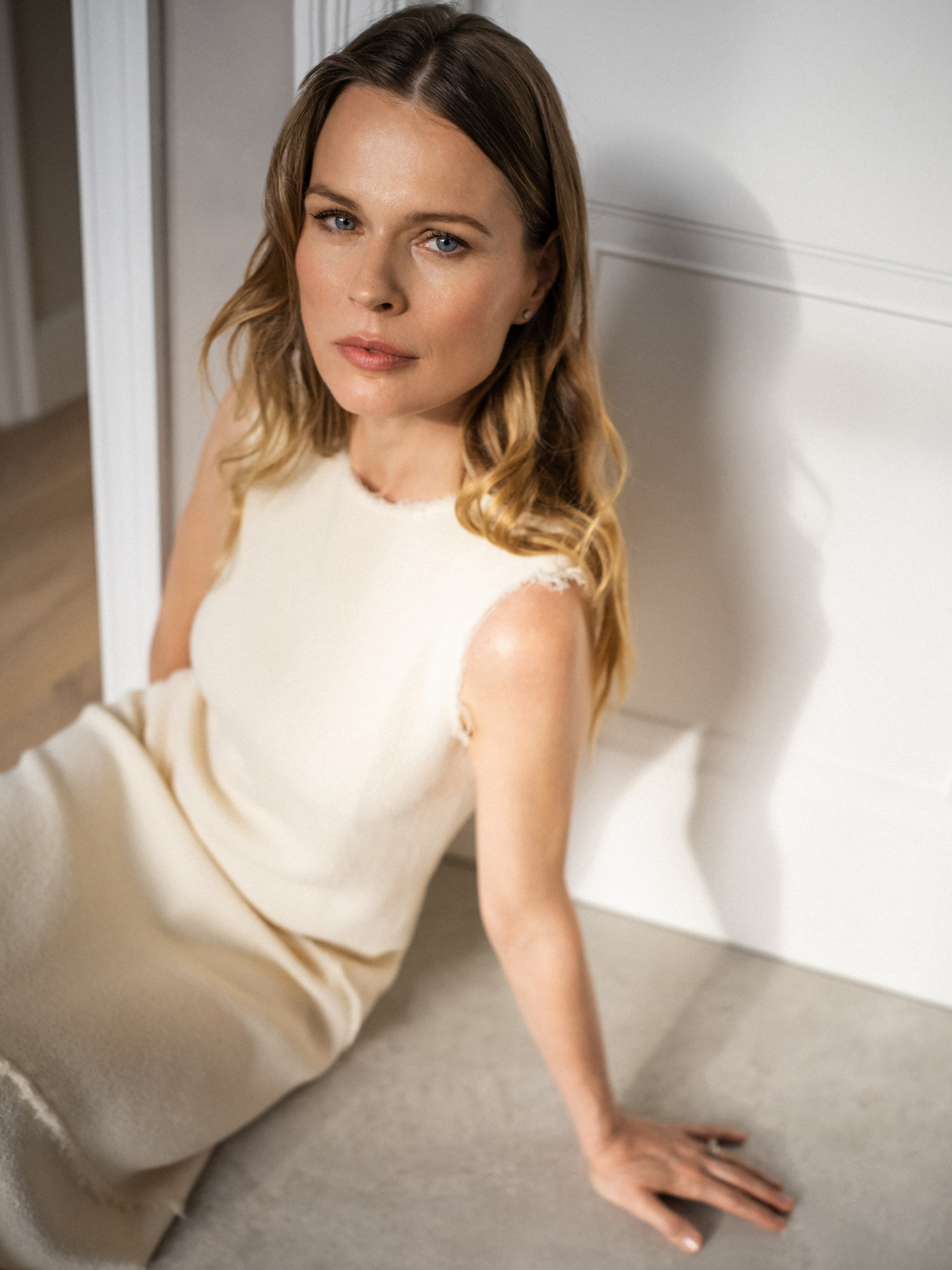
- Olha Freimut in 2025
- Born: Olha Mykhailivna Konyk; 25 February 1982 (age 44); Novyi Rozdil, Ukrainian SSR
- Occupations: TV presenter, journalist, writer and model
- Years active: 2005–present

Olha Freimut (born Olha Mykhailivna Konyk, Ukrainian: Ольга Михайлівна Коник-Фреймут, married name: Lokotko; 25 February 1982) is a Ukrainian TV presenter, journalist, writer and model.

== Biography ==
Olha was born on 25 February 1982 in Novyi Rozdil, Lviv Oblast. Her father was a footballer, and her mother was a master of swimming. In her early childhood, she attended matches with the participation of her father. For eight years she studied at the piano at the music school.

She received her master's degree in international journalism at the University of Lviv and City, University of London, where she received a diploma magna cum laude. During her studies, she worked as a waitress.

=== Career ===
She had worked as a journalist in the BBC, filming in advertising. After the Orange Revolution, she returned from London to Kyiv, she got a job in the international department at the Channel 5. Later she realised that the job of international journalist does not satisfy her. For a time she worked as a journalist in the fashion-program Breakfast with 1+1.

In 2008, she featured in the daytime show on 1+1. She had learned by journalist Lyudmila Padlevska about casting on the daytime show at Novyi Kanal. Afterwards, she served as a co-presenter of Pidyom with Oleksandr Pedan and Serhiy Prytula. On 27 May 2011, Pidyom's finale was aired.

She writes articles about fashion. In the future, plans to seriously engage in fashion journalism. In 2010, she faced Ukrainian designer Oksana Karavanskaya.

From June 2011, together with Dima Kolyadenko, she led the program Shoumaniya. On 4 March 2012, the series was concluded.

At the end of August 2011, she launched the program Revizor in which Freimut checks the quality of the service sector establishments of Ukraine. This show has become one of the most successful in Novyi Kanal, in the season 2011/12. On 10 March 2012, together with Serhiy Prytula, she leads the show Who's on top?. In the summer of 2012, she led the program Kabrioleto together with Serhiy Prytula and Oleksandr Pedan in which they travelled through Ukraine.

In 2011, the magazine Focus complied rating "30 most successful broadcasters Ukraine", Olha Freimut took 26th place. She has experience in the field of dubbing: in the summer 2011, Fermut played as voice actress in the cartoon The Smurfs.

On 2 December 2011, she led group stage draw the European Football Championship 2012.

In the autumn of 2012, she has been a member of the jury show large reincarnation "ShoumaStgouon".

On 13 October 2013, together with Aram Mnatsakanov she leads to the Novyi Kanal show War of the Worlds as auditor of Chef.

On 3 September 2014, Freimut leads the program Freimut the Inspector on TV 1+1. In 2014, Freimut led the fourth season of the show The Voice of the country and reboot on TV 1+1.

In December 2014, the Special Inspector Freimut issued a report from the ATO zone, conducted an inspection on the basis of the German Armed Forces.

In 2015, ZARINA became the new face of the Jewelry House. On 2 September, at the Forum of Publishers in Lviv, she presented her first book, Where Eats and With whom Freimut Sleeps, and already on 11 October, the trainer at the show "Little Giants" on "1+1".

On 5 April 2016, on the channel 1+1 the premiere of the reality show "On knives" de Freimut was the lead. She voted the role of Pauline in the Polish TV series Our Lady in Warsaw for 1+1. In the same year, she starred in the episodic role of the Russian-Ukrainian series Hotel Elephant. Olga's voice was duplicated by another actress.

According to the magazine New Time, Fermut entered the TOP-100 of successful women of Ukraine.

On 21 February 2018, Fermut became the director of the ladies school in the reality show From Ladette to Lady. On 6 March 2018, Fermut presented the first children's book Bread Jan – a 40-page story about the bat that wanted to see the sun. In May of the same year, her third book, School of Mrs. Freimuth: Etiquette, was published for ladies and panic people with a sense of humor and self-irony.

In the summer, Olha took part in the filming of the talk show Olia in Novyi Kanal. The show became the first legal adaptation of the famous American format The Ellen DeGeneres Show or shortly "Ellen" in the world.

== Filmography ==
=== Film ===
Year	Title	Role	Original name
2013	Double life	Lisa	Подвійне життя
2013	Unforgotten Shadows	journalist	Тіні незабутих предків
2016	Our lady in Warsaw	Polina	Dziewczyny ze Lwowa
2016	Hotel Eleon	cameo	Отель Элеон
2019	11 children from Morshyn	cameo	11 дітей з Моршина

=== Television ===
Year	Name	Role	Channel	Notes
2008–2011	Lift	TV presenter	Novyi Kanal	Morning show
2011–2012	Showmania	TV presenter	Novyi Kanal	
2011–2014	Revizor	TV presenter	Novyi Kanal	
2012–2013	Battle of the Sexes	TV presenter	Novyi Kanal	
2012	CabrioLito	TV presenter	Novyi Kanal	
2012	ШОУМАSТГОУОН	TV presenter	Novyi Kanal	
2013	War of the worlds. Revizor against the Chief	TV presenter	Novyi Kanal	
2014	Passion for the Revizor	TV presenter	Novyi Kanal	
2014–2015	The Voice of Ukraine	TV presenter	1+1	
2014–2015	Inspector Freimut	TV presenter	1+1	
2015	Little giants	team coach	1+1	
2016–2017	At the knives	TV presenter	1+1	
2016	New Freimut Inspector. Cities	TV presenter	1+1	
2018	From Ladette to Lady	TV presenter	Novyi Kanal	
2018	Bytva ekstrasensiv	guest of the program	STB	
2018	Olia	TV presenter	Novyi Kanal	

== Personal life and activism ==
Freimut's publicly used surname is not a pseudonym, but derives from the family name of her grandmother, an ethnic German. Part of her German relatives were deported to Kazakhstan and still reside there. She also has relatives in Germany.

Freimut is a fan of the English football club Fulham, as the godfather of her daughter Zlata is one of the directors of the club.

She participated in a number of videos on the theme of "Odna Krayina – Yedyna Krayina" in support of the territorial integrity of Ukraine.
