= Dead Lake (TV series) =

2019 Russian TV series

- Russian: Мёртвое озеро
- Directed by: Roman Prygunov
- Country of origin: Russia
- Original language: Russian
- No. of series: 1
- No. of episodes: 8

Production
- Running time: 48 minutes
- Production company: Mediaslovo

Original release
- Network: TV3
- Release: 2018

Dead Lake (Russian: Мёртвое озеро, romanized: Myortvoe ozero) is a 2019 Russian TV series. It is a production of TV3 Russia, and Mediaslovo. The show won a prize during Accolade Global Film Competition in United States, and also won local prizes in Russia, during a film festival in Omsk.

The series' plot considered as Slavic Noir story with the classic crime plot been mixed with unique mystical flavor of Northern Russia along with its folklore.

== Plot ==
Maksim Pokrovskiy is an experienced police officer from Moscow Police, who was sent to Northern Russia to investigate the murder of the local Oligarch's daughter.

== Cast ==
- Yevgeny Tsyganov as Maksim Pokrovskiy
- Andrey Smolyakov as Oligarch
- Nadezhda Mikhalkova as Natasha
- Pavel Tabakov as Pavel Skvortsov
- Lev Prygunov as Sandibalov
- Aleksandr Robak as Mikhail Ganich
- Aleksandra Rebenok as Alina
- Timofey Tribuntsev as Yonko
- Polina Kutepova as Zinaida Petrovna
- Ksenia Kutepova as Tatyana Petrovna
- Kirill Polukhin as Smertin

== Production ==
Filming of the TV series took place in 2017, in Kirovsk, Murmansk Oblast, at the foot of the Khibiny Mountains and on the shore of lake Big Vudyavr.
