= Svyatoslav Podgayevsky =

Russian film director and screenwriter

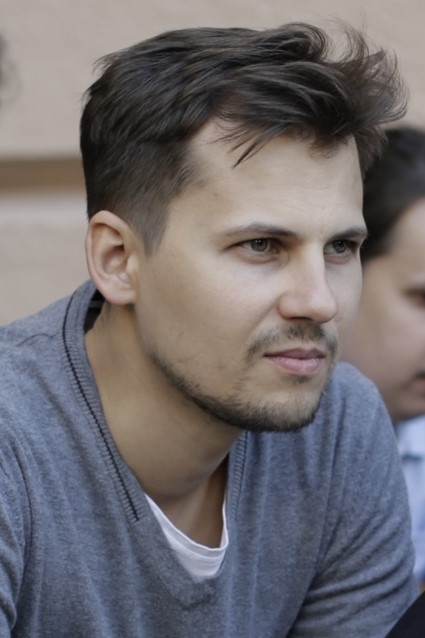
- Svyatoslav Podgayevsky
- Born: Svyatoslav Yurievich Podgayevsky; March 8, 1983 (age 43); Moscow, Soviet Union (now Russia)
- Citizenship: Russian Federation
- Occupations: film director, screenwriter

Svyatoslav Yurievich Podgayevsky (Russian: Святослав Юрьевич Подгаевский; born March 8, 1983) is a Russian film director and screenwriter.

== Biography ==
Svyatoslav was born in Moscow. He worked as an editor at Gorky's studio, as a director on the NTV channel, and after that he began filming short films and clips for popular musical groups. Since 2014, he has been directing horror films.

== Filmography ==
- Block 18 (2014)
- Queen of Spades: The Dark Rite (2015)
- The Bride (2017)
- New World (2017)
- The Mermaid: Lake of the Dead (2018)
- Baba Yaga: Terror of the Dark Forest (2020)
- Dark Spell (2021)
