= Maryana Spivak =

Russian film and television actress (born 1985)

- Марьяна Спивак
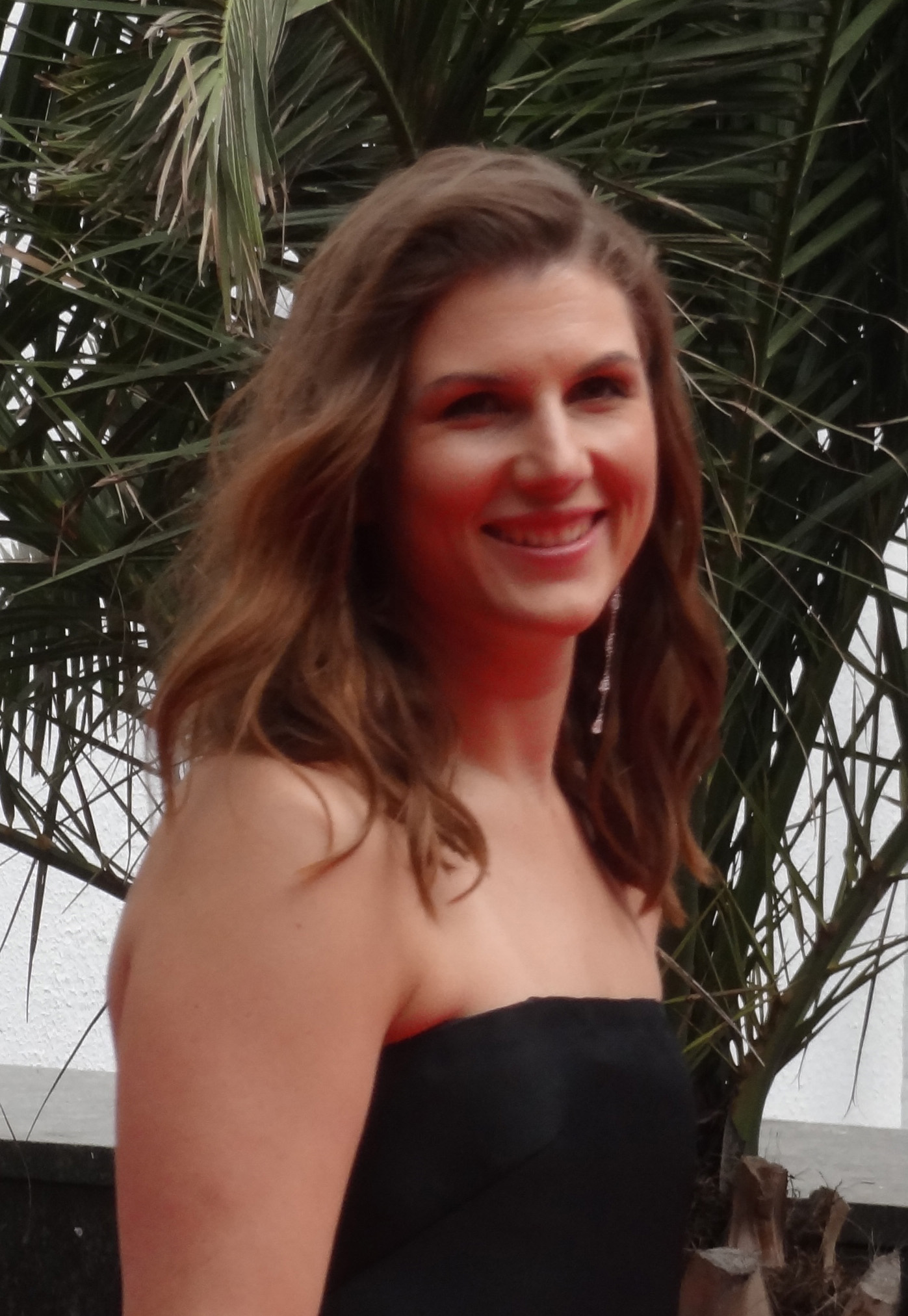
- Maryana Spivak at the opening ceremony of the 28th Kinotavr Open Russian Film Festival in Sochi, 2017.
- Born: Maryana Timofeevna Spivak; 23 March 1985 (age 41); Moscow, RSFSR, USSR
- Education: Moscow Art Theatre School
- Occupations: Actress, voice-over dubbing
- Years active: 1991–present
- Family: Zhanna Prokhorenko

Maryana Timofeevna Spivak (Russian: Марьяна Тимофеевна Спивак; born 23 March 1985) is a Russian film and television actress known for the 2017 film Loveless.

== Life and career ==
She is the granddaughter of actress Zhanna Prokhorenko and daughter of Timofey Spivak. She studied at the Moscow Art Theatre School.

For director Andrey Zvyagintsev's Loveless, the crew spent four months on casting the character Zhenya, though Spivak was an early candidate, eventually successful. Spivak said she took the opportunity for a starring role in a film and the chance to work with Zvyagintsev. For Loveless, Spivak was nominated for Best Actress at the Russian Guild of Film Critics awards.

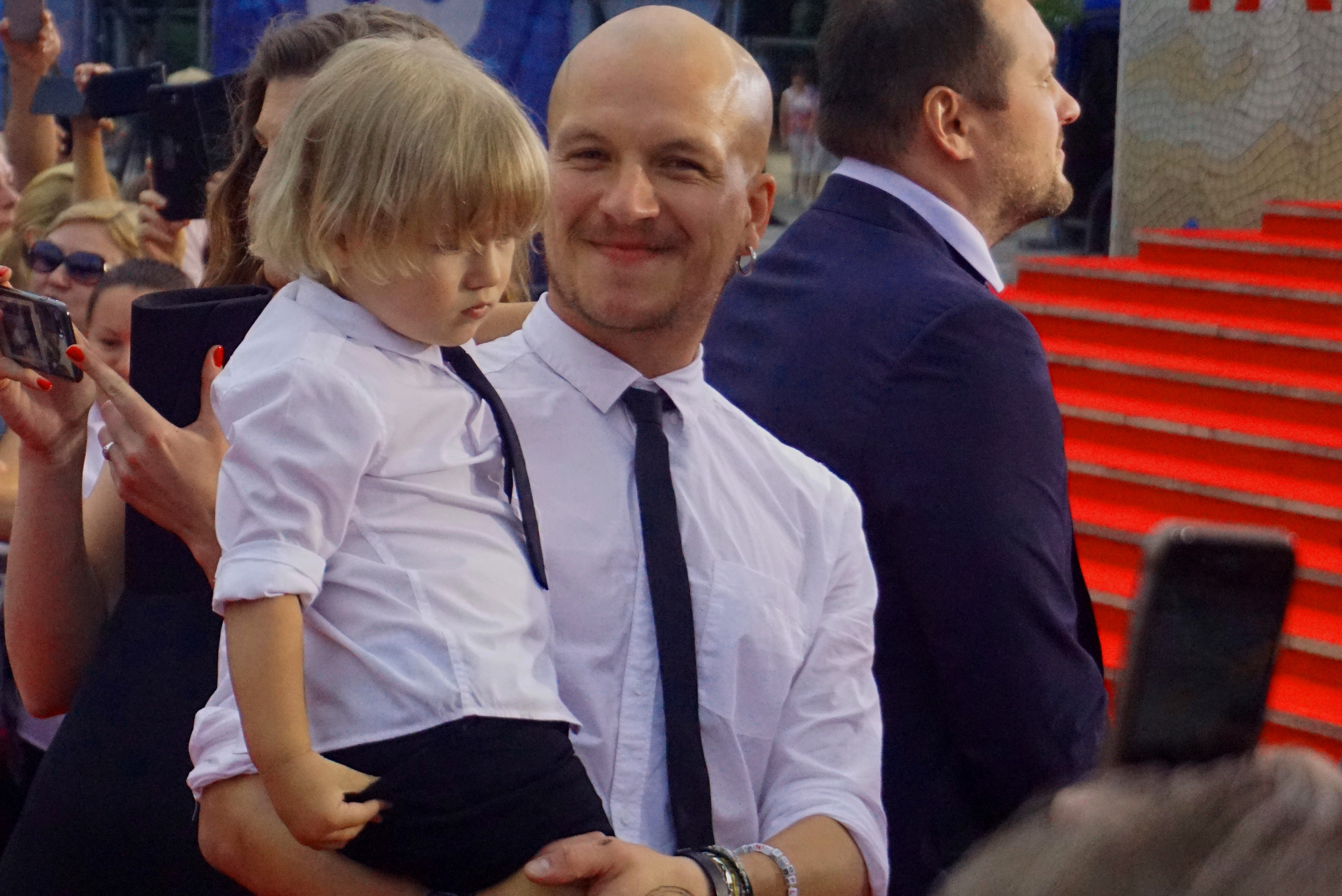
Maryana Spivak’s husband and son, Kinotavr-2017.

== Filmography ==
=== Film ===
Year	Title	Role	Notes
1991	Until the thunder breaks out	Tanya, Voronin's daughter	
2001	Woe misfortune	Vasilisa	
2014	Space Dogs: Adventure to the Moon	Strelka	voice-over (ru)
2017	Loveless	Evgenia Sleptsova "Zhenya"	
2019	Yesterday	Alexa (Russian Stage Manager)	
2019	Baba Yaga: Terror of the Dark Forest	Yuliya	
2022	Who's There?	mother	
2024	We	A-2248	Post-production

=== Television ===
Year	Title	Role	Notes
2004	Twins	Valya Nikitina, granddaughter of Darya	TV series
2008	Glukhar	Vera	19 series: "Accident" (ru)
2010	Bullet-fool 4	Tanya	Mini-series
2010–2011	Qumi-Qumi	Yusi	Voice acting, animated series
2013	Syn ottsa narodov	Kapitolina Georgievna Vasil'yeva, 3rd (common law) wife and Champion swimmer	TV series
2014	Wiseacre	Ekaterina Favorova	TV series
2016	Partner	Larisa Voytovich, captain	TV series
2018	Vongozero	Irina	TV series
2018	Code	Irina	TV series
2018	The Bureau	Samara	TV series
2020	To the Lake	Irina	TV series
2021	Mediator	Zoya	TV series
