= The Whirlpool (2022 film) =

- Directed by: Denis Kryuchkov
- Written by: Olga Loyanich
- Produced by: Alexander Kalushkin; Olga Loyanich
- Starring: Alyona Mitroshina; Wolfgang Cerny; Vyacheslav Chepurchenko; Viktoria Skitskaya; Ekaterina Solomatina; Sofya Ozerova
- Cinematography: Hayk Kirakosyan
- Edited by: Serik Beyseu
- Music by: Andrey Kliminov, Hermes Zygott
- Production company: Radragon
- Distributed by: Nashe Kino
- Release date: December 1, 2022 (Russia)
- Running time: 99 minutes
- Country: Russia
- Language: Russian

Omut (released in English territories as The Whirlpool) (Russian: Омут, romanized: Omut, lit. 'Still Waters') is a 2022 Russian mystical horror film directed by Denis Kryuchkov. It stars Alyona Mitroshina (who makes her film debut), Wolfgang Cerny and Vyacheslav Chepurchenko.

The film was theatrically released in Russia on 1 December 2022. It was produced without government funding. The screenplay was written by Olga Loyanich and was partially based on her real-life experiences with occult practices.

== Plot ==
The film centers around Lyuba, a married woman trapped in a cycle of violence and abuse. Seeking escape from her torment, she travels to an isolated forest with her friends and turns to shamanic rituals and occult practices. As she delves deeper into these dark and mysterious realms, the boundaries between reality and the supernatural become increasingly blurred. Lyuba is forced to confront her own demons and wrestles with the consequences of her actions.

== Awards ==
The film won the Grand Prix and the Best Actor (Wolfgang Cerny) awards at the Vienna Independent Film Festival in September 2023.

== Cast ==
- Alyona Mitroshina as Lyuba
- Wolfgang Cerny as Danila
- Vyacheslav Chepurchenko as Sergey, Lyuba's husband
- Viktoria Skitskaya as Sveta
- Ekaterina Solomatina as Zoya
- Sofya Ozerova as Eva
