= Olia (talk show) =

Ukrainian talk show

- Also known as: ОЛЯ
- Genre: Talk show
- Created by: Olha Freimut
- Presented by: Olha Freimut
- Opening theme: "Lost on You" by LP
- Country of origin: Ukraine
- Original language: Ukrainian
- No. of seasons: 1

Original release
- Network: Novyi Kanal
- Release: August 28, 2018 – present

Olia (Ukrainian: ОЛЯ) is a Ukrainian talk show broadcasting on Novyi Kanal. It is noteworthy for being an adaptation of the American TV show The Ellen DeGeneres Show. Olha Freimut presents the show.

== Synopsis ==
The show was entertainment, focusing on coverage of current topics raised a few days before airing.

The show was broadcast on Novyi Kanal four days a week, Tuesday to Friday.

The guests of the show were stars of different kinds, such as Serhiy Prytula, Iryna Bilyk, Mélovin and Jamala. Each episode featured a non-celebrity hero who made some great achievement, performed a meaningful act, or had an unusual passion or skill. During the entire episode, the presenter interacted with the audience in the hall.

=== Adaptation ===
The show was an adaptation of the American talk show The Ellen DeGeneres Show. The Olia show is the first legal adaptation in the world.

== Controversy ==
=== Censorship and Ukrainian disapproval ===
The show featured a repeating segment based on visiting online enemies, called "Haters: I LOVE YOU". Olha Fremut visited people who insulted her on the Internet. This part of the program raised some controversy.

By the end of the first season of the show, many in the Ukrainian media published news about the failure of the show on Ukrainian television and its cancellation. The main reason given was the mentality of the Ukrainians, who do not like the format of the show and consider it more suitable for Americans. The Novyi Kanal has not made any official statements about this.
