= Main Road Post =

Russian visual effects studio

- Industry: Visual effects
- Founded: 2006
- Headquarters: Moscow, Russia,
- Key people: Arman Yahin, Mikhail Lyosin, Julia Huene
- Website: MRPost.ru

Main Road Post is a Russian visual effects studio headquartered in Moscow, Russia. As of 2022 the studio has gained international reputation (which continued despite 2022 Russian invasion of Ukraine). The studio has worked on the visual effects for the largest-scale International films of the last decade.

It is best known for the visual effects of the film, Wanted, League of Legends, Stalingrad.

The studio was ranked 15th among the top 100 most influential animation studios.

== Filmography ==
Year	Production	Credit
2008	The Admiral	visual effects
2008	Wanted	visual effects
2008	The Inhabited Island (Part I)	visual effects
2009	The Inhabited Island (Part II)	visual effects
2009	High Security Vacation	visual effects
2010	The Priest	visual effects
2012	Z’olushka	visual effects
2012	August Eighth	visual effects
2013	Metro	visual effects
2013	Stalingrad	visual effects
2014	Avantyuristy	visual effects
2014	Sunstroke	visual effects
2014	Seventh Son	Previsualization
2015	Prizrak	visual effects
2015	The Dawns Here Are Quiet	visual effects
2015	Chastnoye Pionerskoye 2	visual effects
2015	Leonov	Proof of concept
2016	The Duelist	visual effects
2016	Legend of Kolovrat	visual effects

== TV series ==
Year	Production	Credit
2011	Dostoevskiy	visual effects
2012	The White Guard	visual effects
2014	Besy	visual effects

== Games ==
Year	Production	Credit
2007	TimeShift	visual effects
2016	Escape from Tarkov	visual effects
