= America's Psychic Challenge =

Reality TV series in the UK and US

America's Psychic Challenge is a competitive reality TV series on the Lifetime Television Network. The show originated in the UK with the title Britain's Psychic Challenge. Bunim/Murray Productions produced the American version for Lifetime TV.

== Description ==
During a national search of thousands, sixteen self-professed psychics were interviewed and tested to gain a spot to compete on television. For the program, tests were created by the production company with the stated goal of assessing contestants' supernatural abilities. As each psychic is tested, they are awarded points based on the results of the tests. At the end of every show, the two psychics with the highest scores move forward to continue in the competition, and the low-scored contestants leave the series. Ultimately, the final two psychics face off to compete for the grand prize of $100,000 and the title of "America’s #1 Psychic".

== Broadcast history ==
The show premiered on the Lifetime Television Network on October 12, 2007. Eight episodes aired with John Burke as the show host. The winner of the first season was Michelle Whitedove. In the final challenge, Whitedove and her challenger Jackie Barrett were handed a photograph of a man. As psychic detectives, they were given thirty minutes to find a stuntman that was buried underground in ten acres of California desert. Whitedove laid the photograph of the man on the exact location, as men dug up the box in which a stuntman lay buried with an oxygen tank.

Other competitors were Tori Allah, Jeff Baker, Sloan Bella, Jamie Clark, Silvana Fillmore, Joseph McBratney, Lynn Miller, Naryza Sanchez, Catherine Powell, Karyn Reese, Zenobia Simmons, Kim Stempien, Joseph Tittel, and Robin Zodiac.

February 2011 winner Michelle Whitedove was invited to participate in Psychic Challenge International or Het Zesde Zintuig. Winners from six countries were brought together for extreme psychic challenges in the Netherlands.

As of January 2012, the Psychic Challenge format has gained worldwide success. Zodiac Rights was sold the Psychic Challenge franchise and script into 15 countries or territories: USA, Norway, Great Britain, Bulgaria, the Netherlands, Denmark, Estonia, Belgium, Romania, Chile, Australia, Russia (on the TNT channel), Latvia, and Ukraine (on the STB channel). Russia is airing the twenty-fifth season (producing it without the distributor's involvement since 2022), and Ukraine is airing the twenty-first season.

== See also ==
- Bitva extrasensov – Similar TV show in Russia
- Exploring Psychic Powers Live – Similar TV show aired live on June 7, 1989
- List of prizes for evidence of the paranormal
