= Zhanna Agalakova =

Russian journalist

- Жанна Агалакова
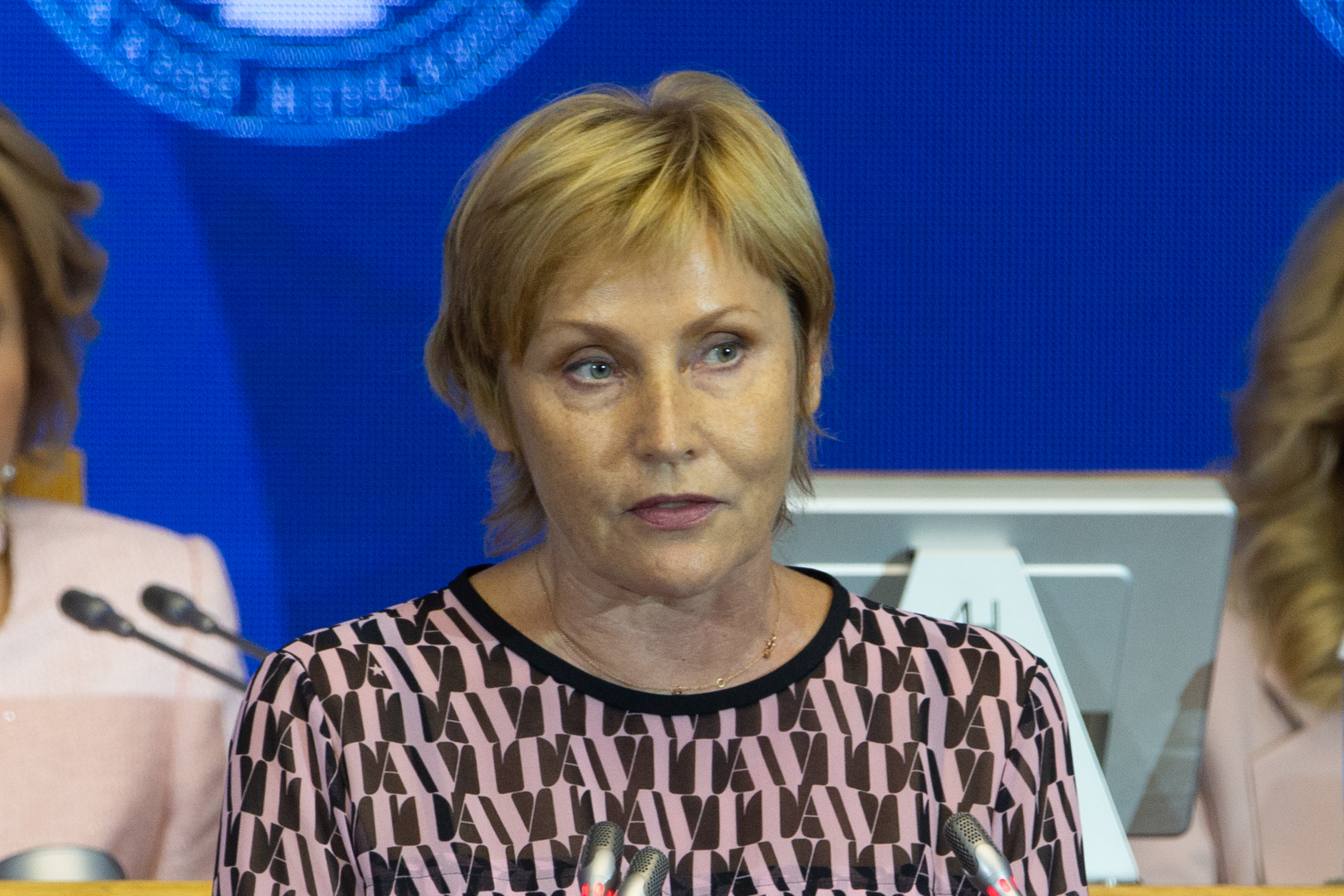
- Agalakova in 2021
- Born: 6 December 1965 (age 60); Kirov, Russian SFSR, Soviet Union
- Education: Moscow State University (1991)
- Years active: 1992-2022
- Known for: Vremya

Zhanna Leonidovna Agalakova (Russian: Жа́нна Леони́довна Агала́кова; born 6 December 1965) is a Russian journalist, special correspondent, and television news presenter.

In 2002 she was nominated for the TEFI Award and in 2006 was awarded the Medal of the Order "For Merit to the Fatherland". and Order of Friendship (2018)

== Early life and education ==
Born in Kirov, Russia, Agalakova spent her teenage years (1979–1983) living in Mongolia with her parents. She graduated from music school in piano. She began her career as a secretary to the editor-in-chief of the local newspaper "Komsomolskoye Plemya" in Kirov. Agalakova graduated from Moscow State University's Faculty of Journalism in 1991.

== Career ==
Following university, Agalakova worked as a correspondent for the Ministry of Internal Affairs' television studio, producing segments for the program "Man and the Law." She also served as the press attaché for the International Association for Combating Drug Abuse and Drug Trafficking. In 1992, she joined the RIA Novosti news agency as a correspondent in the secular chronicles department.

In 1996 Agalakova gained prominence as the host of the morning news program on NTV (Russia) channel. She also participated in the Russian version of the game show "Fort Boyard" in 1998.

In October 1999, Agalakova joined Channel One Russia, presenting daytime and evening editions of "Novosti" ("News") and the main evening news program "Vremya." She co-hosted the political talk show Vremena together with Vladimir Posner from 2000 to 2002. The talk show won the TEFI Award in 2001. Agalakova was nominated for the TEFI Award as Best News Presenter in 2002.

In March 2000, Agalakova announced the results of presidential elections in Russia. In May of the same year, she announced the results of the Russian professional jury at the Eurovision Song Contest held in Stockholm.

In 2004, Agalakova was named one of the top 10 most trusted journalists in Russia in a survey by Antenna TV magazine (Антенна-Телесемь).

In September 2005, Agalakova became Channel One Russia's foreign correspondent in Paris, covering the most important events in France and European Union. From January 2013 till August 2019 she was a special correspondent in New York. She returned to Paris in August 2019.

Agalakova's last report on Channel One Russia came out on February 17, 2022. On March 3, 2022, she tendered her resignation from the channel, officially leaving it two weeks later, on March 17, 2022. Agalakova said she quit in protest over Russia's invasion of Ukraine, and said she believes Russian television was being used to spread Kremlin propaganda. In an interview published by the BBC, Agalakova described Russian TV as 'brainwashing' its viewers.

In September 2022, she returned her state awards in protest against the partial mobilization in Russia announced by President Putin, stating his presidency was leading the country to the abyss.

In February 2025 the Russian Ministry of Justice declared Zhanna Agalakova a foreign agent.

In 2025, Agalakova made her directorial debut with the feature-length documentary film “A Little Gray Wolf Will Come”. The film had its world premiere at the Sheffield DocFest on June 21, 2025.

== Personal life ==
Agalakova dated an Italian physicist, Giorgio Savona, since 1991. They married in 2001. They have a daughter, Alice, born in 2002 in Rome. Agalakova lives in France.
