= Elena Letuchaya =

Russian television presenter and journalist

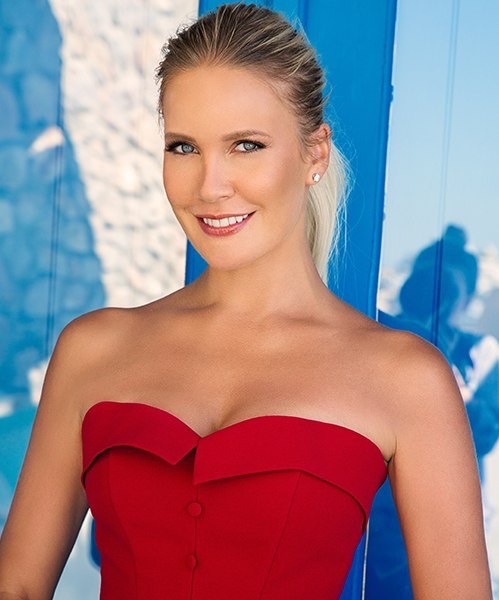
- Elena Letuchaya in 2016.
- Born: Elena Alexandrovna Letuchaya; 5 December 1978 (age 47); Yaroslavl, Soviet Union
- Occupations: Author and editor of TV programs, television presenter, editor in chief producer, public figure
- Awards: Society for the protection of Consumer rights — the Project "quality Mark"; Hotel Business Forum 2014.
- Website: http://elena-letuchaya.com/

Elena Alexandrovna Letuchaya (Russian: Елена Александровна Летучая; born 5 December 1978) is a Russian journalist, television presenter, producer and director. Host of Revizorro on the channel Friday!. She is the author of documentaries for TV channels TV3, STS and Friday!. She is the author and presenter of ART Life and Territory of men on the channel, Global Star TV. She graduated from School of broadcasting "MITRO", where she currently heads the "Workshop of Elena Letuchaya".

In 2015, she was among the sexiest women of Russia according to the magazine "Maxim", taking 91st place.

== Biography ==
In 2007, she received, and 2010 she graduated from the School of television "Ostankino" following her first video, which was dedicated to the blood donors. At the same time she worked as an editor in a news room to VGTRK, education and training for the live shows presenter of economic news on TV. At the same time filming scenes for the TV channel Capital.

In 2009-2010 she worked on the Global TV channel Star TV. The author of the program ART Life and Territory of men.

In 2011 became the editor and producer of the Studio of special projects First, which produces the talk show Let Them Talk, Tonight. December 2012 — May 2013: "TV Reiting" producer. The production of documentaries for television Friday!, and the project Funny People. In the July–September 2013 worked in "Yellow, Black and White" as the producer of the series Kitchen. The producer of the series for two seasons. She is also the producer of the sequel TV. She was the producer of the show Holiday in Mexico. July — August 2013: TV3, producer, producing documentaries "trials". September — December 2012 — producer of Onion Heads, production of television programs for MTV. February 2014 — host of "Revizorro" to channel Friday.

Producer of documentaries on the TV series Kitchen and Ship.

July 10, 2015 acted as a leading sixth of the annual award "Consumer Rights and Service Quality".

On 24 September 2015 she was the guest on the program Evening Urgant.

January 27, 2016 and was headed by "Studio Elena Letuchaya" at the faculty of journalism Moscow Institute of television and radio broadcasting "Ostankino" (MITRO).

== Hobbies and preferences ==
In her spare time she enjoys yoga, horseback riding and running, roller skating and Alpine skiing.

== Awards and nominations ==
- The project "quality Mark" of the Society for the protection of the rights of the Consumer Hotel Business Forum 2014.
- Winner of the contest "Public recognition" of the Fund Anatoly Lisitsyn in the nomination "Our people at the Federal level,".
- Nominated for "Woman of the year 2015" in the category "TV Presenter of the year" by the Russian edition of the magazine Glamour.
