= Sergey Shargunov =

Russian politician

Sergey Shargunov MP
- Сергей Шаргунов
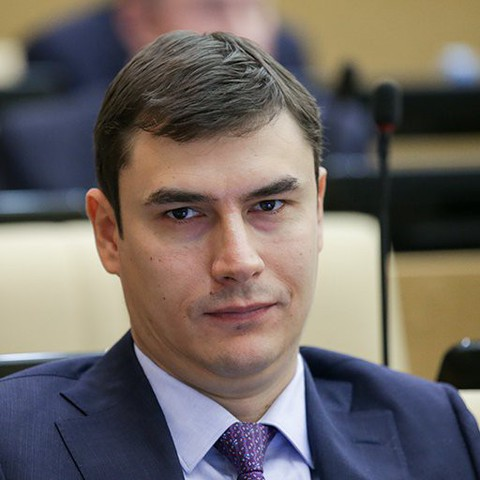
- Shargunov in 2018

Member of the State Duma (Party List Seat)
- Incumbent
- Assumed office 5 October 2016

Personal details
- Born: 12 May 1980 (age 46) Moscow, RSFSR, USSR
- Party: Communist Party of the Russian Federation
- Parent: Alexander Shargunov (father)
- Education: Moscow State University
- Occupation: author

Sergey Alexandrovich Shargunov (Russian: Сергей Александрович Шаргунов; born 12 May 1980, Moscow) is a Russian writer and political figure and a deputy of the 7th and 8th State Dumas.

Sergey Shargunov is a prominent Russian writer, who began his career by winning the Debut Prize for long-form fiction in 2001 at the age of 21. Since his Debut Prize win, Shargunov has gone on to have his Book Without Photographs shortlisted for the National Bestseller Award in 2011; his novel 1993, set in the early 1990s, was also shortlisted for the NatsBest Award, in 2014. In 2019 he was appointed editor-in-chief at the literary journal Yunost.

Sergey Shargunov is the son of the clergyman Alexander Shargunov. While studying at the Moscow State University, Shargunov worked as an assistant to the deputy of the State Duma Tatyana Astrakhankina. At the age of 19, he started writing for the literary journal Novy Mir. From 2002 to 2003, he worked as a correspondent at the Novaya Gazeta. From 2003 to 2007, he worked at the Nezavisimaya Gazeta. In 2004, he co-founded the Youth Movement "Ura!" that cooperated with the Rodina party. In 2006, Shargunov joined the A Just Russia — For Truth. In 2013, he worked as a columnist at the Kommersant FM radio station. He also wrote a blog on the website of the Echo of Moscow radio station. In 2016 and 2021, he was elected deputy of the 7th and 8th State Dumas, respectively.

== Sanctions ==
He was sanctioned by Canada under the Special Economic Measures Act (S.C. 1992, c. 17) in relation to the Russian invasion of Ukraine for Grave Breach of International Peace and Security, and by the UK government in 2022 in relation to the Russo-Ukrainian War.
