= Viktoriya Agalakova =

Russian actress

- Виктория Агалакова
- Born: Viktoriya Agalakova; 30 August 1996 (age 29); St. Petersburg, Russia
- Occupation: Actor
- Years active: 2008–present

Viktoriya Andreevna Agalakova (Russian: Виктория Андреевна Агалакова; born 30 August 1996) is a Russian actress known for playing Nastya in the 2017 horror movie The Bride, starred as Marina in the 2018 horror film Mermaid: The Lake of the Dead, as Polina in 2019 Netflix series To the Lake and as Natashia the captain of an intergalactic football team in the feature film Cosmoball (Goalkeeper of the Galaxy) in 2020.

== Early life ==
Viktoriya Andreevna Agalakova (Russian: Виктория Агалакова; was born on August 30, 1996, in St. Petersburg, Russia, to parents who were originally from Ust-Kamenogorsk in Kazakhstan. Agalakova was a very active child so at six years of age, her mother sent her to the St. Petersburg Music Hall theatre in an attempt to pacify her hyperactivity. At age 14, she joined the St. Petersburg Theatre of Musical Comedy, performing in "Aladdin."

== Career ==
Agalakova's first role was in a historical film "Harmony is the City of Happiness" at the age of 12, but the film was never released. Agalakova played lead role of Nastya in the 2017 horror movie The Bride. Agalakova starred as Marina in the 2018 horror film Mermaid: The Lake of the Dead, about a killer mermaid. The same year landing another main role as Yulia Granovskaya in the Ukrainian television series Sledy v proshloe (Traces of the Past). In 2020, Agalakova starred as Polina in 2020 Netflix series To the Lake, and as Natasha, the captain of an intergalactic football team in the feature film Cosmoball.

== Filmography ==
=== Film ===
Year	Title	Role	Notes
2011	Rasputin (Ru. Распутин)	Anastasia, 17 years old	
2017	The Bride (Ru. невеста)	Nastya	
2018	The Big Game (Ru. большая игра)	Marussia	
2018	Mermaid: The Lake of the Dead (Ru. Русалка: Озеро мертвых)	Marina	
2020	Cosmoball (Vratar Galaktiki) (Ru. Вратарь Галактики)	Natasha	
2021	Yolki (Christmas Trees) 8	Lyusya	

=== Television ===
Year	Title	Role	Notes
2010	Proshchay, 'Makarov'! (En. Goodbye Makarov!) (Ru. Прощай, Макаров!)	Nastya	1 Episode #1.13
2010	Tsvet plameni (en. The Colour of Flame) (Ru. Цвет пламени)	Rita (as a child)	1 episode
2010	Dom u bolshoy reki (en. House by the big river)	Sonya	1 episode
2010	Doznavatel (en. The Interrogator)	1 Episode	Episode 8
2010	Dyshi so mnoy (en. Breathe with me)	Dasha	1 episode
2011	Reportazh sudby	Katya (as Viktoriya Glukhikh)	TV film
2011	Schastlivchik Pashka (Lucky pasha)	Ira	1 episode
2011	Dyshi so mnoy 2 (Breathe with Me 2)	Dasha	1 episode
2013	Patrul. Vasilevskiy ostrov (Patrol. Vasilyevsky Island)	Marina	1 episode
2014	Biryuk	Zhenya Sheveleva	Pilot episode
2014	Kolibel nad bezdnoy (Cradle over the Abyss)	Nastya Kholmogorova	1 episode
2015	Chuzhoe gnezdo	Liza Makridina	1 episode
2015	Catherine the Great	Maid of Honor	12 episodes
2015	Takaya rabota (Such work)	Nadezhda Kirillova	1 Episode - Nevidinka
2015	The Past can wait	Asta	1 Episode
2015	The plague	Lana	1 Episode
2016	Sprosite u oseni (Ask the autumn)	Milk Podolskaya	1 episode
2017	The Bait for the Angel	Irena	16 episodes
2017	The Wish-List	Lisa Titova	1 episode
2018	Sledy v proshloe (Traces of the Past)	Yulia Granovskaya – (main role)	all episodes
2021	Samka bogomola (TV series)	Crime series	Pilot episode
2022	Patient Zero	Yulia Granovskaya	main role - all episodes
2019 - 2022	To the Lake (The Outbreak) (Ru. Эпидемия)	Polina	Series 1 & 2 - all episodes
