= The Bride (2017 film) =

- poster film
- Directed by: Svyatoslav Podgayevsky
- Screenplay by: Svyatoslav Podgayevsky
- Produced by: Zaur Bolotaev; Vladislav Severtsev
- Starring: Victoria Agalakova; Vyacheslav Chepurchenko; Aleksandra Rebenok; Igor Khripunov; Victor Solovyev
- Cinematography: Ivan Burlakov
- Music by: Jesper Hansen
- Production company: Focus Plus Cinema FMP Group
- Distributed by: Karoprokat (Russia)
- Release date: 19 January 2017 (Russia)
- Country: Russia
- Language: Russian
- Budget: $1,163,855

The Bride (Russian: Невеста, romanized: Nevesta) is a Russian psychological thriller horror film directed by Svyatoslav Podgayevsky and starring Victoria Agalakova, Vyacheslav Chepurchenko, Aleksandra Rebenok, Igor Khripunov and Victor Solovyev. The film tells the story of college student Nastya and her fiancé Ivan, who go to meet Ivan's family, only to discover that they have a dark past with many secrets to keep and that they may be planning something sinister for her.

The Bride was released on 19-January-2017. It received mixed reviews from critics.

== Plot ==
In 1832, a chemistry doctor called Iosif Gamel presents his thesis to the Imperial Science Academy of Saint-Petersburg which says that the new lens made out of a new type of silver can not only capture light, but also a person's soul. This proves to be true despite the academy rebuking Gamel, resulting in the creation of a ritual, in which the souls of dead people are transferred into another body.

A photographer is then shown taking pictures of his dead wife (called The Bride) with her eyelids painted as though to appear open. He then travels to a village, where he plans to transfer his wife's soul into a young peasant girl through his wife's ring. He arrives to find the villagers protesting, but he manages to disperse them after killing one of them. The photographer puts the ring on the girl's finger, seals her in the coffin with the dead wife, and prepares to bury the coffin when it suddenly begins to violently shake. When the photographer and his fellow participants in the ritual open up the coffin, they see that the wife's soul has been transferred. The photographer hides the photograph that he took earlier in the basement while waiting for his wife's soul to recover. She awakens one day in her new body, but is appalled at the new situation.

In the present day, college student Nastya marries her fiancé Ivan. She decides to go to his family's house to host their wedding, despite Ivan's objections. They arrive at his family's home, where she is introduced to Ivan's sister Liza. At dinner, Liza gives Nastya a ring with a red-diamond (the ring seen at the beginning of the film), a move which does not resonate well with Ivan. Nastya also begins to experience visions, including seeing clones of herself doing actions in a pattern. One night, she finds Ivan and Liza arguing about keeping Nastya here, and Ivan threatens to leave.

The next day, Liza reports that Ivan has gone into town to see his friends, much to Nastya's dismay since he did not warn her that he was going. Additionally, she begins experiencing more and more visions, and becomes increasingly suspicious about the family's true nature. She also discovers a secret passage inside the walls of the house, and discovers the photograph of The Bride hidden by the photographer at the beginning of the film.

The increased suspicions lead to Nastya to attempt to leave the house. However, she suddenly sees a family friend walking nearby with a lantern. Nastya follows the elderly woman to the second house on the plot, where she finds her feeding an imprisoned Ivan, revealing that the family had locked him up inside after his argument with Liza, implying that the family wants Nastya to stay. Ivan notices her, and tells her to run as she encounters a white skinned spirit in a black wedding dress. She falls unconscious while attempting to flee, and subsequently experiences a dream. In it, she walks into the same house, but in the same period as in the beginning of the film, where the photographer goes upstairs to see his wife after she has become reportedly ill. A friend tries to convince him not to go, but he goes anyway.

Nastya then sees the photographer being killed by The Bride's malevolent spirit. After killing him, The Bride turns around and says that "she" (referring to another female person) will take her, before attacking Nastya, waking her up. She is taken back to the house, where she is given coffee that makes her purposely fall asleep. Nastya wakes up the next day, with the "wedding" being prepared. While getting dressed, she looks at the photograph of the previous matriarchs of the family, and upon looking at their faces, she realises that they are all the same person. Nastya attempts to escape but is bound up by the ritual members and locked up in a room where she encounters the living skeleton possessed by the spirit of The Bride.

Ivan rescues Nastya and drives away with her in his car. He reveals that his family is the organiser of the ritual and that they needed her so that The Bride's soul could be transferred into another body. He also reveals that the only way to destroy any more chances of soul transfer is to destroy the photograph of The Bride. Nastya reveals that she knows where the photograph is moments before they are T-boned by the ritual members who capture Nastya and leave Ivan for dead.

Nastya is brought back to the manor, where she gets the red-diamond ring put on so that The Bride's soul can be transferred. She is sealed in the coffin and dumped into the ground where she is possessed by The Bride's spirit. When the coffin is opened a possessed Nastya tells the people, "The body is ruined" before convulsing and falling back into the coffin. It is revealed that the ritual failed because Nastya and Ivan had earlier consummated their relationship, leaving Nastya and Ivan non-virgins. The members then disperse, and the leader is killed by the spirit soon afterwards.

Ivan, who had managed to survive the car crash, makes it back to the house and finds the unconscious Nastya. Meanwhile, Liza and her children are confronted by The Bride's spirit, and the children flee to the secret passage. Nastya, remembering about the photograph, goes to the room where she found it, encountering the children there but The Bride's spirit appears. Liza, knowing that the red-diamond ring attracts the spirit, takes it from Nastya, puts it on herself and is possessed by the spirit. Nastya takes the photograph and confronts Liza, who has taken one of the children. Liza attacks her, and she drops and loses the photograph in the process. As she is about to kill Nastya, the child calls out to her, snapping Liza out of her possession. She tells Nastya to take care of her children before sacrificing herself by breaking a lantern and dying in the fire, allowing Nastya, Ivan and the children to escape the house.

Soon afterwards, a new family arrives at the house, intending to purchase and renovate it. They notice a hole in the wall, and when they look through it, a figure slides past them.

== Cast ==
- Viktoriya Agalakova as Nastya
- Vyacheslav Chepurchenko as Ivan
- Aleksandra Rebenok as Liza, Ivan's sister
- Igor Khripunov as the photographer
- Natalia Grinshpun as Aglaya
- Victor Solovyev as Ivan and Lisa's father
- Marina Alhamdan as The Bride
- Miroslava Karpovich as wife
- Yevgeny Koryakovsky as Nastya's teacher

== Filming ==
The shooting took place in Moscow and Moscow Oblast.

== Marketing ==
A 4-minute trailer was released online on 10 October 2016.

== Remake ==
An American remake was announced in October 2017, with Chad Hayes and Carey W. Hayes producing alongside Vlad Severtsev.
