= Malozhma =

Malozhma Маложма
- Settlement
- Location within Arkhangelsk Oblast Location within Russia
- Coordinates: 64°09′N 38°17′E
- Country: Russia
- Region: Arkhangelsk Oblast
- District: Onezhsky District
- Time zone: UTC+3:00

Malozhma (Russian: Маложма) is a rural locality (a settlement) in Pokrovskoye Rural Settlement of Onezhsky District, Arkhangelsk Oblast, Russia. The population was 368 as of 2010.

== Geography ==
It is located on the Tamitsa River, 35 km north of Onega (the district's administrative centre) by road. Onega is the nearest rural locality.
