= List of Russian films of 2011 =

A list of films produced in Russia in 2011 (see 2011 in film).

== 2011 ==
Title	Russian title	Director	Cast	Genre	Notes
All Inclusive	All inclusive, или Всё включено!	Edouard Radzyukevich	Mikhail Bespalov	Comedy	
Berry-Strawberry	Ягода-Клубника	Piotr Pałgan	Elena Frolova, Konstantin Nikitin, Irina Krestyaninova	Comedy	
Boris Godunov	Борис Годунов	Vladimir Mirzoyev	Maksim Sukhanov	Drama	
Brothel Lights	Огни притона	Alexander Gordon	Oksana Fandera, Ada Rogovtseva	Drama	
Generation P	Generation P	Victor Ginzburg	Vladimir Epifantsev	Comedy	
The Hunter	Охотник	Bakur Bakuradze	Gera Avdochenok	Drama	It was screened in the Un Certain Regard section at the 2011 Cannes Film Festival.
The Dandelion		Galina Kuvivchak-Sakhno	Ivan Stebunov, Anna Kuzina, Aleksandr Mokhov, Nikolay Dobrynin, Anastasia Tsvetaeva, Elena Safonova, Anatoliy Yaschenko, Larisa Rusnak	Melodrama	
Elena	Елена	Andrey Zvyagintsev	Nadezhda Markina, Elena Lyadova	Drama	
The Best Movie 3	Самый лучший фильм 3	Kirill Kuzin	Garik Kharlamov	Comedy	
The Dry Valley	Sukhodol	Aleksandra Strelyanaya	Yana Esipovich, Oleg Garkusha	Drama	
Faust	Фауст	Alexander Sokurov	Johannes Zeiler, Anton Adasinsky, Isolda Dychauk, Hanna Schygulla	Drama	The film won the Golden Lion at the 68th Venice International Film Festival.
Fairytale.Is	Сказка. Есть	Konstantin Statskiy, Elizaveta Solomina, Aleksandr Barshak	Elizaveta Boyarskaya; Maksim Matveyev; Mikhail Porechenkov; Konstantin Khabensky	Fairytale	
Five Brides	Пять невест	Karen Oganesyan	Elizaveta Boyarskaya, Aleksey Dmitriev	Comedy	
Home	Дом	Oleg Pogodin	Sergei Garmash, Bogdan Stupka	Drama	
Inadequate people	Неадекватные люди	Roman Karimov	Ilya Lyubimov, Ingrid Olerinskaya	Comedy	
Innocent Saturday	В субботу	Aleksandr Mindadze			
Insignificant Details of a Random Episode	Незначительные подробности случайного эпизода	Mikhail Mestetsky	Kirill Käro	Comedy	
Ivan Tsarevich and the Gray Wolf	Иван Царевич и Серый волк	Vladimir Toropchin	Nikita Yefremov, Artur Smolyaninov	Animation	
Lucky Trouble	Выкрутасы	Levan Gabriadze	Konstantin Khabensky, Milla Jovovich, Ivan Urgant	Romantic comedy	
Maid	Домработница	Alex Kiryushchenko	Olga Medynich	Drama	
My Boyfriend Is an Angel	Мой парень — ангел	Vera Storozheva	Artur Smolyaninov, Anna Starshenbaum	Comedy	
My Dad Baryshnikov	Мой папа Барышников	Dmitry Povolotsky	Anna Mikhalkova, Viktor Abrosimov	Comedy	
Once Upon a Time There Lived a Simple Woman	Жила-была одна баба	Andrei Smirnov	Darya Ekamasova, Aleksei Serebryakov, Nina Ruslanova	Drama	
Office Romance. Our Time	Служебный роман. Наше время	Sarik Andreasyan	Svetlana Khodchenkova, Volodymyr Zelenskyy, Marat Basharov	Romantic comedy	
Only You	Только ты	Olga Kulikova Dobrova	Irina Lachina	Comedy	
The Practice of Beauty	Упражнения в прекрасном	Viktor Shamirov	Yuriy Kutsenko, Kseniya Radchenko	Comedy	
The Pregnant	Беременный	Sarik Andreasyan	Dmitri Dyuzhev	Comedy	
The Pyrammmid	ПираМММида	Eldar Salavatov	Aleksei Serebryakov, Fyodor Bondarchuk, Pyotr Fyodorov	Crime	
A Quiet Outpost	Тихая застава	Sergey Makhovikov	Andrey Chadov, Sergey Selin	Drama	
Raspoutine	Распутин	Josée Dayan	Gérard Depardieu, Vladimir Mashkov, Fanny Ardant	Biopic	Russian-French co-production
Rita's Last Fairy Tale	Последняя сказка Риты	Renata Litvinova	Olga Kuzina, Tatyana Drubich	Drama	
Satisfaction	Сатисфакция	Anna Matison	Denis Burgazliev, Yevgeni Grishkovetz	Drama	
Shadowboxing 3: Last Round	Бой с тенью 3D: Последний раунд	Aleksei Sidorov	Denis Nikiforov, Yelena Panova, Andrey Panin, Pavel Derevyanko	Sports drama	
Shooting Mountains	Стреляющие горы	Rustam Urazaev	Roman Kurtsyn	War	
Siberia, Monamour	Сибирь, Монамур	Vyacheslav Ross		Drama	
Star Worms	Звёздный ворс	Andrey Kagadeev, Nikolay Kopeykin	Andrey Kagadeev, Nikolay Kopeykin	Comedy	
Target	Мишень	Alexander Zeldovich			
The Darkest Hour	Фантом	Chris Gorak		Science fiction	Russian-American co-production
Heavenly Court	Небесный суд	Alyona Zvantsova	Konstantin Khabensky, Mikhail Porechenkov	Drama, fantasy	
Twilight Portrait	Портрет в сумерках	Angelina Nikonova			
Two Days	Два дня	Avdotya Smirnova	Fyodor Bondarchuk, Kseniya Rappoport	Romantic comedy	
Vysotsky. Thank You For Being Alive	Высоцкий. Спасибо, что живой	Pyotr Buslov	Sergey Bezrukov	Drama	
What Men Still Talk About	О чём ещё говорят мужчины	Dmitriy Dyachenko	Leonid Barats	Comedy	
Yeltsin: Three Days in August	Ельцин. Три дня в августе	Oleg Antonov	Dmitry Nazarov	Drama	
Yolki 2	Ёлки 2	Dmitry Kiselyov, Alexander Baranov, Alexander Kott, Levan Gabriadze	Ivan Urgant, Sergei Svetlakov, Aleksei Petrenko	Comedy	
You and I	Ты и я	Roland Joffé	Mischa Barton, Anton Yelchin, Lena Katina, Julia Volkova	Drama	US-Russia co-production

== See also ==
- 2011 in Russia
