= Radiant Angel Film Festival =

International Film Festival

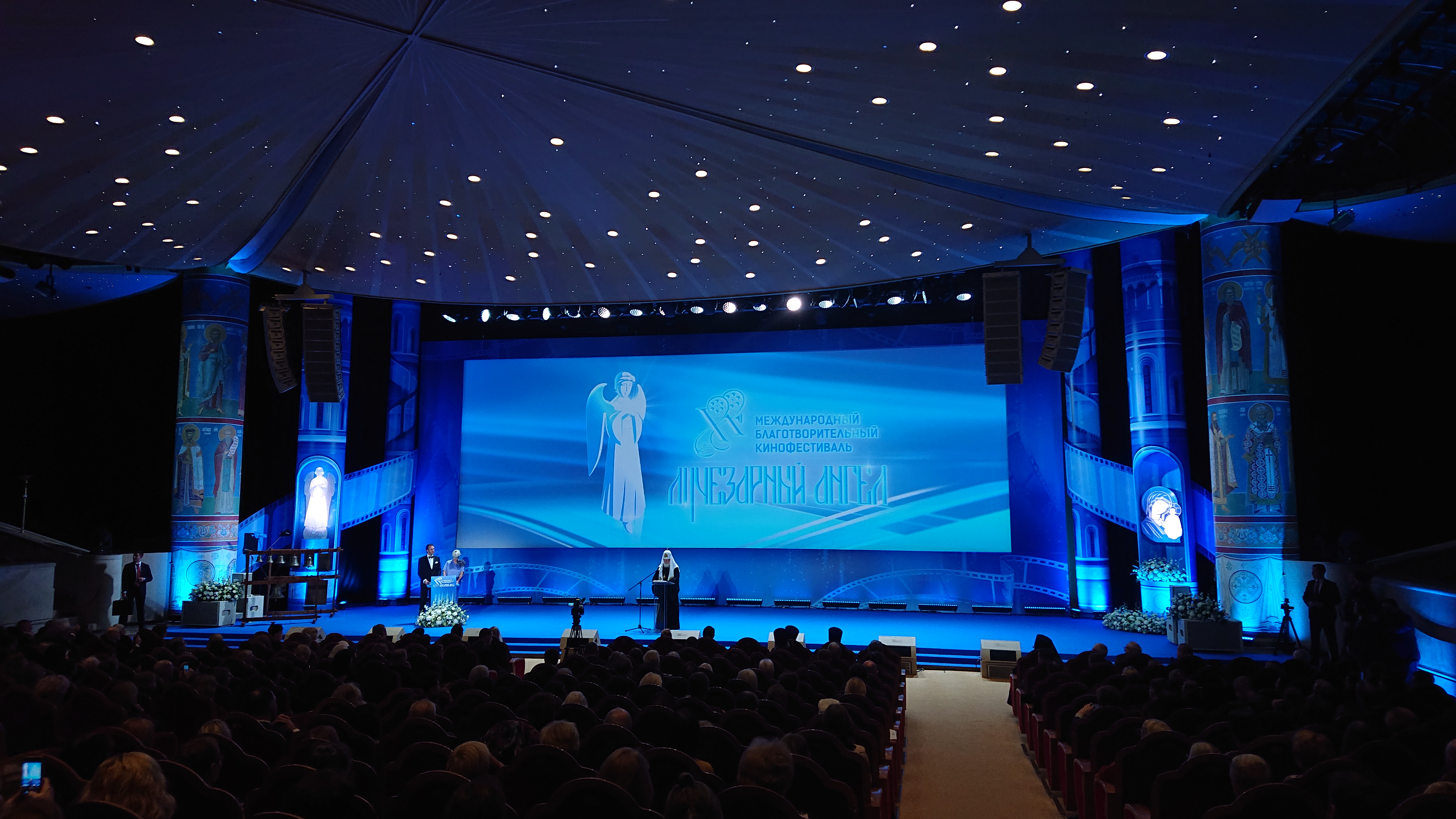
- Location: Moscow, Russia
- Founded: 2007; 18 years ago (as International Film Festival)
- Awards: Grand Prix
- Website: https://luchangela.ru/

The Radiant Angel Film Festival (Russian: Лучезарный ангел) is an international charity film festival, established in 2003 at the initiative of the Institute of Expertise in Educational Programs and State-Confessional Relations. It is dedicated to the Day of National Unity and the holiday of the Kazan Icon of the Mother of God (November 4). Since 2005, it has been held annually in Moscow in November. The status of "international" was gained in 2007. The festival has become a significant event in the social and cultural life of Russia and other countries. As of 2023, over 2,000 films have been shown within the framework of the film festival, and its screenings and other events have been attended by over 170,000 spectators. During the festival, guests are also offered masterclasses and creative meetings with masters of domestic cinema, premieres, and special screenings. Creative and educational activities are organized for children as well.

The film festival is held under the patronage of Svetlana Medvedeva, the president of the Foundation for Social and Cultural Initiatives. His Holiness Patriarch Kirill of Moscow and all Rus' serves as the spiritual guardian of the film forum.

The festival's films are selected based on moral criteria, as stated by the festival's spiritual expert, Archpriest Konstantin Sopelnikov. He remarked that none of the films in the festival contain anything "offensive to the feelings, morality, or taste of viewers of any age." The film festival preserves and advances the unique humanistic and artistic heritage of Russian cinema, as well as promoting works that uphold enduring spiritual and moral ideals, values of family, patriotism, and social harmony.

The festival's motto is "Good cinema returns".

== Goals and objectives ==
Main goals

- To acquaint the younger generation of Russia with the spiritual heritage of the motherland.
- To revive children's, youth, and family cinema.
- To initiate and support the processes of creating, producing, and distributing "Good cinema."

Main objectives

- Preservation, development, and popularization of the tradition of cinema about spiritual and moral ideals.
- Contribution to the upbringing of the younger generation and the people of Russia through filmmaking in line with the national spiritual, moral, and patriotic values of the homeland.
- Introducing the younger generation to the discernment of good and evil.
- Promotion of a healthy lifestyle.

== Competition program ==
The film festival offers a variety of competitive programs, including:

- full-length feature films
- short feature film
- documentaries
- animated films

== Grand Prix winning films ==
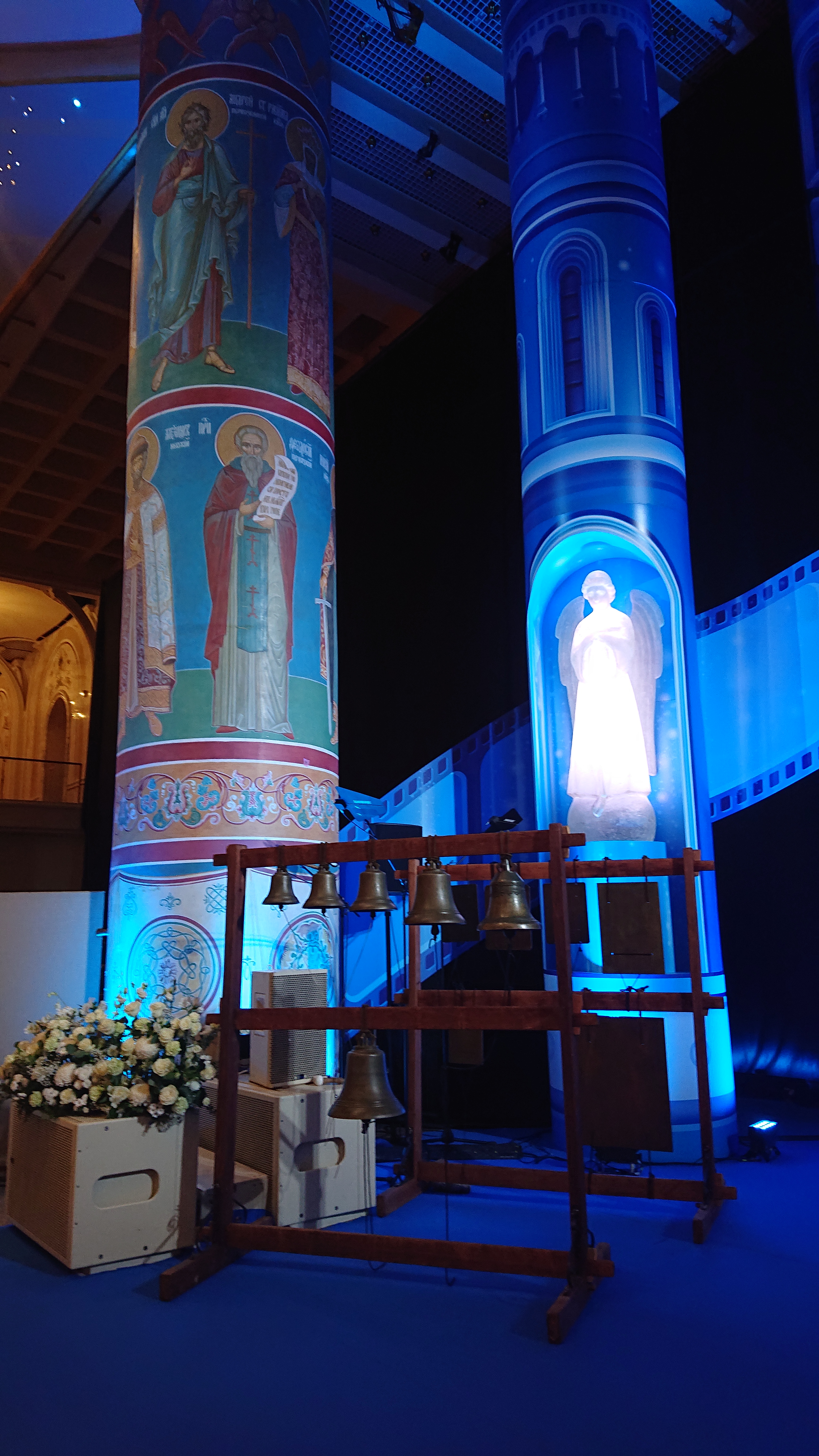
The symbol of the film festival is a radiant angel

- 2007 — «My Love», Aleksandr Petrov — Russia
- 2008 — «Angel's Chapel», Nikolai Dreyden — Russia
- 2009 — «The Priest», Vladimir Khotinenko — Russia
- 2010 — «Night of a lifetime», Nikolay Khomeriki — Russia
- 2011 — «The last doll game», Georgy Negashev — Russia и «When will it snow?», Natalia Galuzo — Belarus
- 2012 — «Daughter (2012 film)», Alexander Kasatkin — Russia
- 2013 — «And Here's What's Happening to Me», Viktor Shamirov — Russia
- 2014 — «Test», Alexander Kott — Russia
- 2015 — «Borderless», Amir Hossein Asgari — Iran
- 2016 — «I'am a teacher», Sergey Mokritskiy — Russia
- 2017 — «Bolshoi», Valery Todorovsky — Russia
- 2018 — «The Age of Pioneers», Dmitry Kiselyov — Russia
- 2019 — «Sister (2019 film)», Aleksandr Galibin — Russia
- 2020 — «Happy as Lazzaro», Alice Rohrwacher — Italy/Switzerland/France/Germany
- 2021 — «Padrenostro», Claudio Noce — Italy
- 2022 — «Palmira», Andrei Kravchuk — Russia
- 2023 — «Near the White Sea», Alexander Zachinyaev — Russia
- 2024 — «The Challenge», Klim Shipenko — Russia
