= Terrible Dad =

2022 Russian children's film

- Directed by: Karen Oganesyan; Yuri Korobeinikov
- Written by: Kirill Zhurenkov; Nadezhda Vorobyova
- Produced by: Karen Oganesyan; Polina Ivanova; Irina Voronova; Vladimir Permyakov
- Starring: Yevgeni Grishkovetz; Kirill Käro; Ulyana Pilipenko; Erik Panich; Irina Voronova
- Cinematography: Yuri Korobeynikov; Nikolai Platonov
- Production companies: Kargo Film; Irsna Media
- Distributed by: KaroRental
- Release date: 27 October 2022
- Country: Russia
- Language: Russian
- Budget: ₽265.3 million
- Box office: ₽157 million

Terrible Dad (Russian: Грозный папа, romanized: Groznyy papa) is a 2022 Russian children's adventure comedy film directed by Karen Oganesyan and Yuri Korobeinikov. The film stars Yevgeni Grishkovetz as Tsar Ivan the Terrible, who travels to the past to fix a mistake and ends up in modern-day Russia (circa 2022). The cast also includes Kirill Käro, Ulyana Pilipenko, Erik Panich, and Irina Voronova.

Terrible Dad was released in theatres on 27 October 2022.

== Synopsis ==
Having quarreled with his son, Tsar Ivan the Terrible accidentally mortally wounds him—as depicted in the painting by Ilya Repin. To fix this, Ivan, with the help of a magical grimoire from his legendary library, decides to travel to the past a moment before the fatal blow. However, everything does not go according to plan, and the tsar finds himself in our time, where he meets the Osipov family.

Nikita Osipov is an unsuccessful archaeologist and an equally unsuccessful father and husband. Recently divorced, he has lost contact with his children—Romka and Polya. The Osipov family becomes embroiled in Ivan's tale, as he tries to find the grimoire and save his son.

== Cast ==
- Yevgeni Grishkovetz as Tsar Ivan the Terrible
- Kirill Käro as Nikita Osipov
- Ulyana Pilipenko as Polya Osipova
- Erik Panich as Romka Osipov
- Irina Voronova as Olga Osipova
- Igor Vernik as Pototsky
- Yelena Safonova as Martha
- Anastasiya Todoresku as Aida the witch
- Mikhail Orlov as Shapiro
- Ignaty Akrachkov as Ioann
- Aleksandrina Adamova as girl at the banquet
- Svetlana Avdina as guide at the Tretyakov Gallery
- Viktor Tsekalo as doctor

== Production ==
The companies Kargo Film and Irsna Media have been involved in the development of the project, which was carried out with the support of the Cinema Foundation of Russia.

=== Filming ===
Principal photography took place in September 2021 in Moscow, the region of Moscow Oblast, and Rostov Oblast. The main filming locations were Saint Basil's Cathedral and the Rostov Kremlin.
