= Satisfaction =

Satisfaction may refer to:

- Contentment
  - Computer user satisfaction
  - Customer satisfaction
  - Job satisfaction
- Satisfaction theory of atonement, a Christian view of salvation
- The regaining of honour in a duel
- Satisfaction (logic), the process or outcome of assigning values to the free variables of a [satisfiable formula

== Law ==
- Satisfaction of legacies, a doctrine of fulfilling a legacy during the testator's lifetime.
- Accord and satisfaction, a contract law concept about the purchase of the release from a debt obligation

== Film and television ==
- Satisfaction (2025 film), an independent arthouse film
- Satisfaction (1988 film), an American comedy-drama film
- Satisfaction (2010 film), a Russian drama film
- Satisfaction (American TV series), a 2014–2015 drama series
- Satisfaction (Australian TV series), a 2007–2010 drama series
- Satisfaction (Canadian TV series), a 2013 sitcom
- "Satisfaction" (Do Not Disturb), a 2008 TV episode
- "Satisfaction" (Young Justice), a 2012 TV episode

== Music ==
- Satisfaction!, a 1965 album by Don Patterson, or the title track

=== Songs ===
- "(I Can't Get No) Satisfaction", by the Rolling Stones, 1965; covered by Devo (1977) and others
- "Satisfaction" (Benny Benassi song), 2002
- "Satisfaction" (Eve song), 2003
- "Satisfaction" (F.T. Island song), 2011
- "Satisfaction" (Laura Branigan song), 1984
- "Satisfaction", by Vanilla Ice from Extremely Live, 1991
- "Satisfaction", by Wendy & Lisa from Fruit at the Bottom, 1989
- "Satisfaction", by Zayn from Icarus Falls, 2018

== See also ==
- THEESatisfaction, a 2008–2016 American hip-hop duo
- Satisfactory, a 2024 factory simulation video game
- Satisfiability, a property pertaining to mathematical formulas
- Satisfy (disambiguation)
