= Pryamoy efir =

2023 Russian drama film

- Directed by: Karen Oganesyan
- Written by: Dmitry Lanchikhin; Benik Arakelyan
- Produced by: Karen Oganesyan; Benik Arakelyan; Irina Voronova; Polina Ivanova; Denis Dubovik
- Starring: Pavel Chernyshyov; Kirill Käro; Irina Voronova; Angelina Strechina; Soslan Fidarov; Ulyana Pilipenko; Anastasiya Todoresku
- Cinematography: Yuri Korobeynikov
- Edited by: Avet Hovhannisyan; Yuliya Lyubomirova
- Music by: Denis Dubovik
- Production companies: Irsna Media; Movses Film; Kargo Film
- Distributed by: The White Nights
- Release date: April 6, 2023
- Running time: 75 minutes
- Country: Russia
- Language: Russian
- Budget: ₽51 million
- Box office: ₽1 million

Pryamoy efir (Russian: Прямой эфир) is a 2023 Russian psychological drama film directed by Karen Oganesyan about a young blogger who, in pursuit of hype, loses his moral character. The cast is represented by Pavel Chernyshyov and Kirill Käro.

Pryamoy efir was theatrically released in Russia on April 6, 2023, by the White Nights.

== Plot ==
A rich blogger named Egor travels to the Caucasus to participate in the filming of a test drive of a car. After he arrives plans change because the car was cancelled and he decides to travel to a “City of the Dead” architectural site instead. He is accompanied by Alexander, his operator. When they arrive to the site, their driver gets fed up by Egor’s rudeness and drives off. Egor is exploring the architectural site, and soon Alexander accidentally steps on a land mine. Egor wants to take advantage of this, so he puts his camera on streaming and taunts Alexander, forcing him to wear advertising merchandise on camera. He promises that if Alexander steps off the mine and explodes, Egor will give money to Alexander’s daughter who is in need of an operation for her cancer. The stream was viewed by Alan, a North Caucasus paramedic whose sister was killed by Alexander in the 1980’s, when Alexander was a neo-Nazi. Alan takes a knife and drives to the architectural site. Meanwhile, Alexander’s daughter watches the stream from her home and collapses from stress, she is soon seen to be being cared by doctors.

After more than two hours of Alexander standing on the mine, Egor finds out that Alexander was a neo-Nazi and Alexander tells him that Alan is driving to kill him. After more than four hours, a nearby sheep steps on another mine and explodes, causing Alexander to fall off his mine. Alexander’s mine did not explode so he starts chasing Egor around the area, while the camera still films. Soon, Egor steps on a mine himself and Alexander starts taunting him, mocking Egor. Alexander then urinates on Egor’s shoe and pretends to leave, but actually calls paramedics. However, mid-call Egor’s mine explodes, causing his leg to be obliterated. Egor rolls on the ground in pain, and soon Alan arrives, stabbing Alexander (presumably fatally), and drives off to the hospital with the wounded Egor. Egor’s administrator who saw the explosion says that the video got them a lot of money. The film ends with a memory of Alan’s sister singing in the native language, while Egor is in the hospital, recovering. At the very end he transfers 5 million rubles (about $70,000 at the time of filming) to Alexander’s daughter.

== Cast ==
- Pavel Chernyshyov as Egor
- Kirill Käro as Alexander Kolomentsev (also tr. Aleksandr)
  - Stanislav Tkachenko as Alexander Kolomentsev in his youth
- Irina Voronova as Alina
- Angelina Strechina as Asya
- Soslan Fidarov as Alan Gabisov
  - Aslan Tsallati as Alan Gabisov in his youth
- Ulyana Pilipenko as Nina
- Anastasiya Todoresku as Katya
- Xenia Shundrina as Olya

== Production ==
Principal photography will take place in March to April 2021 in Moscow and the Republic of North Ossetia–Alania, and the film companies Kargo Film, Irsna Media and Movses Film are responsible for production.

Producer Benik Arakelyan, back in his student years, he had the idea to show a person against the backdrop of the natural elements. The period of self-isolation helped him finalize the idea.

== Release ==
The premiere date in Russia is scheduled in cinemas across the country from April 6, 2023. The distributor of this Russian psychological drama in the territory of the Russian Federation is the White Nights company.
