= And Here's What's Happening to Me =

- Film poster
- Russian: Со мною вот что происходит
- Directed by: Viktor Shamirov
- Written by: Gosha Kutsenko; Viktor Shamirov
- Produced by: Eduard Iloyan; Yuriy Kutsenko; Andrey Novikov
- Starring: Gosha Kutsenko; Viktor Shamirov; Aleksandra Petrova; Olesya Zheleznyak; Nikolai Chindyajkin
- Cinematography: Semyon Yakovlev
- Music by: Mikael Tariverdiev
- Production companies: All Media; Drugoe Kino
- Release date: November 19, 2012
- Running time: 72 min.
- Country: Russia
- Language: Russian

And Here's What's Happening to Me (Russian: Со мною вот что происходит, romanized: So mnoyu vot chto proiskhodit) is a 2012 Russian comedy-drama film directed by Viktor Shamirov.

== Plot ==
The film takes place on December 31. A fifteen-year-old girl's father dies, and she does not know who she wants to become, an oncologist or a food designer. This film is about what was and what has become.

== Cast ==
- Gosha Kutsenko as Artyom
- Viktor Shamirov as Valentin
- Aleksandra Petrova as Alyona
- Olesya Zheleznyak as Nastya
- Nikolai Chindyajkin as Famous Surgeon
- Margarita Shubina as Olga
- Aleksandr Robak as Alyona's father
- Aleksandr Grishaev as Aleksandr
- Pavel Sborshchikov as Pavel
- Aleksey Trotsyuk as Igor
