= The Sniffer =

Russian-Ukrainian television series

- Ukrainian: Нюхач
- Genre: Detective fiction
- Created by: Artyom Litvinenko
- Written by: Artyom Litvinenko; Andriy Babik
- Directed by: Artyom Litvinenko
- Starring: Kirill Käro; Ivan Oganesyan; Mariya Anikanova; Nina Gogaeva; Nikolai Chindyajkin; Aleksey Zorin; Oleksiy Khilskyi
- Composer: Nikita Moisyeyev
- Country of origin: Ukraine
- Original language: Russian
- No. of series: 4
- No. of episodes: 32

Production
- Executive producers: Andriy Rizvanyuk (season 1); Maksym Asadchyy (season 2)
- Producer: Victor Mirsky
- Cinematography: Andrey Lisetskiy (season 1); Graham Frake (season 2); Anton Fursa
- Editor: Vladimir Zapryagalov
- Running time: 49–54 minutes
- Production company: Film.UA

Original release
- Network: ICTV, 1TV
- Release: November 11, 2013 – 2019

The Sniffer (Russian and Ukrainian: Нюхач, romanized: Nyukhach) is a Russian-language detective series produced and shot in Ukraine by FILM.UA Television, created, co-written, and directed by Artyom Litvinenko.

== Premise ==
The show is about a man, known as the Sniffer, who has an unusually sensitive sense of smell that allows him to investigate crimes by detecting and distinguishing trace amounts of various substances. He works alongside his childhood friend, Viktor Lebedev, an officer in the Special Bureau of Investigations.

== Cast and characters ==
- Kirill Käro as The Sniffer
- Ivan Oganesyan as Col. Viktor Lebedev
- Mariya Anikanova as Yulia
- Nina Gogaeva as Tatyana Voskresenskaya
- Nikolai Chindyajkin as General
- Aleksey Zorin as Maxim
- Agnė Grudytė as Irina Nordin
- Viktor Shchur as SBR employee
- Denis Martynov as Gena
- Oleksiy Khilskyi as Robert

== Production ==
The series premiered on 11 November 2013 on the Ukrainian TV channel ICTV and began airing in Russia on 16 December 2013, for 1TV. By 2014, the series had been sold in sixty countries.

Even before its premiere, the series was officially renewed for a second season, with eight new episodes. The second season opened on 1TV on 5 October 2015, with cinematography by Graham Frake, who had previously been head of photography for Downton Abbey.

In 2016, Amazon added the first season to their Amazon Prime lineup.

By 31 January 2017, filming of the third season was completed. Like the first two seasons, the third season consists of eight episodes, which were shot over the course of six months.

Beginning in May 2017, the first two seasons were streamed on Netflix and the third season was later added. As of 2021, Netflix no longer carries the series.

== Soundtrack ==
- Brainstorm — "Years and Seconds"
- Dmitry Bortniansky — "Concerto No.2 in D major"
- George Frideric Handel — "The Arrival of the Queen of Sheba", from the oratorio Solomon
- Lev Kolodub — "Ukrainian Dixieland", performed by the brass quintet Major under the direction of Viktor Slupsky
- Onuka — "Time"
- Wacky Room — "Take Me"
- TEEEL — "Wait Is Over"
- Dmitry Snezhko — "Heart Mate"
