= Nikolai Chindyajkin =

Russian actor and theatre director

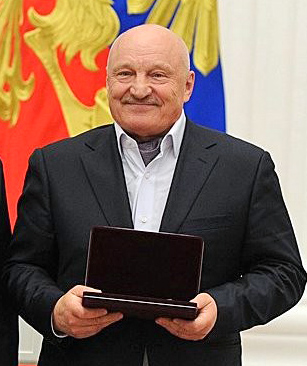
- Born: March 8, 1947 (age 79) village Сhyornoye, Urensky District, Gorky oblast, RSFSR, USSR
- Occupation: actor
- Years active: 1973 — present
- Website: chindyaykin.ru

Nikolai Dmitrievich Chindyajkin (Russian: Николай Дмитриевич Чиндяйкин) is a Russian actor and theatre director. Honored Artist of the RSFSR (1985), People's Artist of Russia (2013).

== Personal life ==
In 2022, he supported the Russian invasion of Ukraine. Consequently, he was sanctioned by the governments of Canada and Ukraine.

== Selected filmography ==
- 1995 Music for December
- 1998 Mama Don't Cry
- 2000 Empire under Attack (TV)
- 2000 Tender Age
- 2002 In Motion
- 2006 The Orange Sky
- 2007 The Sovereign's Servant
- 2012 And Here's What's Happening to Me
- 2013–present The Sniffer (TV)
