= N.O.M. =

Russian experimental rock band

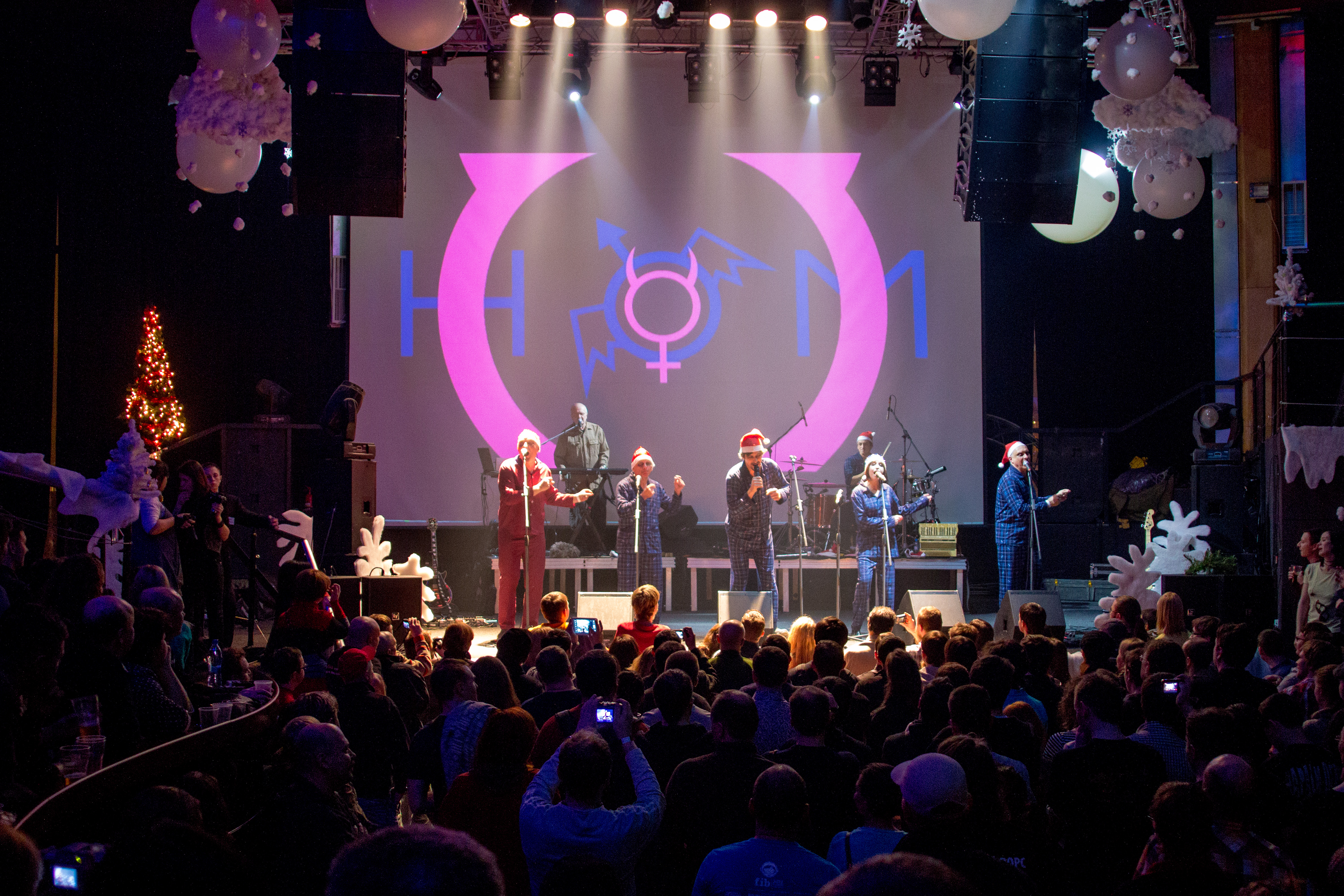
- N.O.M. performing in Saint Petersburg, January, 2013

Background information
- Origin: (Russia) Saint Petersburg
- Genres: Art rock, avant-rock, ska, post-punk
- Years active: 1986–present
- Labels: Фирма "Мелодия"; SoLyd Records; General Records; Caravan Records; SNC Records
- Members: Andrey Kagadeyev; Nikolay Gusev; Alexander Liver; Vitaly Lapin; Nikolai Kopeykin; Varvara Zverkova; Vadim Latyshev; Fedool Zhadniy
- Past members: Ivan Turist (Yuri Saltykov); Sergey Kagadeyev; Ivan Sokolovsky; Alexey Rakhov; Sergey Butuzov; Nikolai Rodionov; Vladimir Postnichenko
- Website: http://www.nomspb.ru/

N.O.M. (also, NOM: Neformálnoye objedinénie molodiózhi, The Informal Youth Association) is a Soviet/Russian experimental rock band, formed in 1987 in Saint Petersburg (then Leningrad), known for its mix of art rock, ska, folklore, classical influences (including occasional bouts of operatic singing) and eccentric theatrical stage shows. N.O.M.'s national breakthrough came in the late 1980s when LenTV started playing the band's controversial videos. Short-time heroes of post-Perestroika alternative culture, N.O.M. have never been accepted neither by the massive pop/rock audiences, nor by the mainstream Russian media, but gathered a strong cult following. The band split into two in 1997, but the 2000s saw NOM-Zhir and NOM-Euro gradually reintegrating, the official reunion concert held on 20 April 2007 in the Saint Petersburg's "Port" Club.

== Band history ==
The band was formed in Pushkin, Saint Petersburg in 1986 by a group of friends, then students of technical colleges and young engineers, who shared the same interests in music, literature and theatre. The name Neformalnoye objedinenie molodyozhi came from the Perestroika media lexicon and referred to the (generally derided) umbrella term by which the "reforming" Communist party tried to "organize" (and this way control) whatever youth communities they deemed "informal" (and therefore potentially dangerous).

N.O.M.'s founding members were: Sergey Kagadeyev (vocals), Andrey Kagadeyev (bass guitar), Alexander Liver (pseudonym of Dmitry Tikhonov; keyboards, vocals), Sergey Butuzov (guitar) and Nikolai Rodionov (drums, flute). Exotic monikers, used by the musicians later became their stage alter egos.

In February 1987 N.O.M. released their debut demo. Initially intended as a musical and theatrical illustration to Andrey Kagadeyev's short story Протез ("Prosthetic"), it was recorded at his home on the primitive Soviet Astra tape-recorder and reminded the absurdist rock of Zvuki Mu. Soon after that N.O.M. took part in the TV musical competition, performed there Ламца-Дрица humorous couplets and were surprised to find themselves among the laureates. The band decided to become professional and defined their artistic credo as "the idiotization of all the dramatic sides of our everyday and cultural life, as well as over-dramatizaton of [life's] most idiotic aspects".

In the late 1987 N.O.M. joined the alternative rock association Мост ("The Bridge"), then, in January 1988, the Leningrad Rock Club. In October 1988 Rodionov left to be replaced by Vladimir Postnichenko (alias Starikan/Gotlib Ulrich Tuzeast; ex-Orkestr Deda Mazaja, Bratja Gadiukiny) who used to jam with the band in his student years. Rodionov continued to occasionally appear with the band on stage playing flute, but retired after his health deteriorated (he died in the 1990s).

=== Breakthrough ===
After the band's appearance at the Sixth Leningrad Rock Club Rock Festival, critics classified them as the followers of AVIA, at this point a well-established conceptual art rock band. The parallel proved to be flawed, but the two bands bonded together. They embarked on the nationwide tour and signed the humorously worded Molotov–Ribbentrop-type "non-aggression pact".

In 1989 the percussionist and performance artist Yuri Saltykov (aka Ivan Turist) joined the band, thus completing what is considered to be its classic line-up. With him the debut Брутто (Gross) album was recorded in the Dvoretz Molodiozhy Studios by producers Sergey Yelistratov and Andrey Novozhilov. Released two years later on the Leningrad Melodyia record label, it became an underground hit and made the band one of the most original phenomena of Peter[sburg]'s new rock scene. By this time N.O.M.'s musical language, initially fashioned in a rudimentary folk rock/cabaret style, started to harden and quickly evolved into a totally integral post-punk meets rhythm and blues kind of sound.

After the Petersburg - Channel 5 and the nascent Moscow Vzglyad TV show started playing the band's videos, its popularity grew rapidly. In 1990 N.O.M. toured Spain and France; in the course of the next five years they played in many European countries and performed at the Seventh Leningrad Rock Club Rock Festival.

==== Golden years ====
By the time the sophomore К Чортям Собачьим (K Chortyam Sobachjim, To Dog's Hell) was recorded and self-released in 1990 (three years later Melodiya followed suit), Sergey Butuzov departed, leaving a certain gap in the overall sound, which AVIA's Alexey Rakhov as a guest guitarist struggled to fill. The album received rave reviews. Anatoly Gunitzkiy wrote in Roxy Express (1990):

At the background of N.O.M.'s every single opus some kind of an absurd plot can be found. Music – a set of multi-coloured stylizations – is nothing more than a brilliant, expressive background for these short stories. Noticeable is the progress: everything here [compared to the debut] is perfectly constructed, worked out and honed down; nothing is superfluous, everything's meaningful – from vocal equilibristic to tricky arrangements… What specific rock genre this belongs to, I wouldn't venture to guess, but it is still heartening to think that it was rock culture that's been able to give haven to all of these incongruous – Odlopez, Airman Kamyshin, Samba Hopkins and other inhabitants of the N.O.M. panopticon... Finally, vocal artistry should be mentioned: the concept of "theatricality" is very much central to the group's aesthetics… and vocals here are of the most sophisticated quality. Whether it's N.O.M.'s solo vocal performances (and every member of the group does indeed sing) or their choruses – everything sounds wildly grotesque. All this brings to mind an idea of some inside-out kind of punk, processed through the mental absurdist machine.

Andrey Kagadeyev reminisced in July 2009: "The second album, 'К Чортям Собачьим', is my all-time [N.O.M.] favourite. This was the band's finest hour. There was real understanding between the band members. No one was trying 'pull the quilt' as it were, there were no superstardom ambitions. We were just bursting with new ideas and felt so easy, so good… It was little later that this unity cracked and the troubles started."

In February 1991 N.O.M. played at the Leningrad Rock Club 10th Anniversary concert; "Samba Hopkins" with A. Liver on vocals later made its way onto the compilation album. In May the band performed in Novosibirsk with, among others, The Shamen.

Due to AVIA's temporary inactivity, Rakhov became the band's semi-official member and played sax on the band's third album Супердиск (Superdisc), featuring such N.O.M. classics as Чорт Иваныч, Город, Душа и Череп. Of the opener, "Nina" (by this time a live favourite), A. Gunitzkiy wrote: "…combining cool electro sound with fragments of delightfully crass phrases… [it] never fails to throw every possible kind of audience into the state of deep mental prostration."

It was in those days that N.O.M. became residents of the Vasileostrovsky Youth Center (later – TaMtAm Club). According to critic and Russian rock historian Andrey Burlaka, the band's style of self-promotion was consistent with their image: they regularly decorated the city walls with self-published quasi-sotsart posters, mostly teaching fans the code of behavior at the self-proclaimed "Kings of St.-Petersburg"'s concerts, but also spreading jovial or misleading information about the band.

Сенька-Мосгаз (Senhka-MosGaz, the band's fourth vinyl LP and first CD) was shelved due to the economic crisis and released in November 1996. Video for the controversial track "7 %" was filmed in France. The album proved to be the last one for A. Liver as a full-time member, who pursued a solo career in 1995. The latter took him to France (where he married) and Geneva Opera (where he continued to sing throughout the next decade). Several musicians tried to fill Liver's shoes, among them jazz musician Yuri Sobolev (ex-Pangei) and Ivan Sokolovski (ex-Nochnoi Prospekt, Miagkie Zveri). In 1995 N.O.M. relocated to the Wild Side Club and played in Rock Side Festival, inviting Alex Rakhov and A. Liver for the occasion.

The release of the greatest hits compilation Ультракомпакт (Ultracompact, General Records) became possible largely due to the help of rock critic and N.O.M. fan Artemy Troitsky. It was followed by the concert album Live is Game [sic]. Among the studio guests were Nikolai Gusev (keyboards), Zhenya Zhdanov (flute, AVIA), Alexey Popov (sax, Doo Bop Sound). Rakhov returned to AVIA to be replaced by guitarist Vitaliy Lapin (ex-Myshi).

In 1996 N.O.M. released Хозяева СССР, или Обезьянье рыло (Masters of the USSR or the Monkey's Muzzle), a short film (first in the series of eight), which looked more like a compilation of early videos. The next one, Made In Europe (1997) documented the group's European voyages. Their Skotino-Rap (Bestiality Rap) video received the special ("For radicalism") prize at the Festival of video art staged by the Moscow Exotica magazine. In 1996 N.O.M. opened for Laibach in the Leningrad's Palace of Youth. Their "Ukrblues" received the MIDEM Grand Prix at Cannes in the Low-budget video nomination.

=== The split ===
In spring 1997 N.O.M. premiered their new sci-fi conceptual show Во имя разума (In the Name of Reason) in the Black Dog Club, which was followed by the album of the same name released by SNC Records. Later that year came the unexpected announcement. The band split into Euro-NOM (Sergey Kagadeyev, Postnichenko and Nikolai Mayorov, who contributed to the filming of "The Masters of the USSR") and Zhir-NOM: Andrey Kagadeyev (bass, vocals), I. N. Tourist (vocals), Nikolai Gusev (keyboards) and (later, occasionally) A. Liver, Lapin recording with both. According to Burlaka, it was "the battle of egos" that caused the conflict: Kagadeev-junior at this point was the band's frontman, while his elder brother its main songwriter.

==== Euro-NOM ====
N.O.M.-junior (augmented with Denis Medvedev of Dva Samoliota), debuted in October 1997 with the concert in the Ne Bei Kopytom Moscow club, as part of the Inter-Fuzz Festival. The owners of the "Saigon" music shop financed the release of the Euro album in November 1997. It received mixed reviews and caused controversy with the way it approached anti-globalism, its main theme. The album's most memorable track (according to A. Burlaka), though, was the cover of Gavrila Lubnin's song poking fun at David Copperfield's Russian tour.

Euro-NOM (as it's become known since then) presented the album at the Lensovet Theatre in St Petersburg: the group members not only changed their aliases (S. Kagadeyev adopting the "Leopard" moniker), but also proposed the new way of interpreting the N.O.M. abbreviation: Новые Основатели Мира, Novyje Osnovateli Mira (New Founders of the World). In March 1998 Vladimir Khanutin (ex-Barbuljator and Chizh & Co, playing drums in both bands) joined Euro-NOM as bassist.

==== Zhir-NOM ====
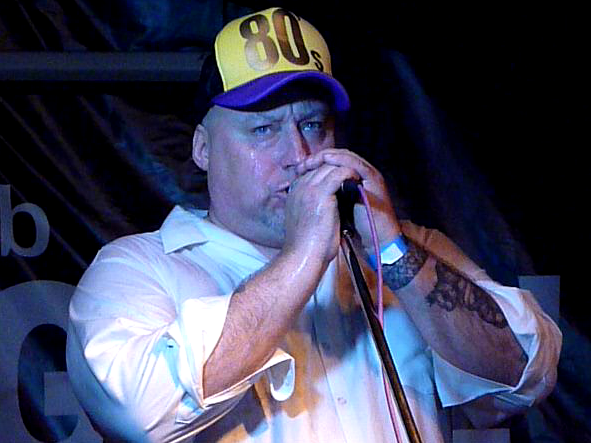
Sergey Kagadeyev in 2011

Zhir-NOM (also N.O.M.-Senior, NomZhirProject) debuted on 30 November 1997 in the St.-Petersburg Zorro Club, where it presented the Жир (Zhir, Fat) album material. Valery Kuteynikov (ex-AVIA) joined the band, and Vassiliy Pavlov replaced Rakhov, who departed to join the Deadushki project. Zhir album was officially released in the spring of 1998 and premiered on 18 May in the Spartak Club, with A. Liver guesting. The concert recorded and produced by Alexandr Mironov (of Strannye Igry and AVIA) was released as Liveжиr in 1999.

For some time the two fractions lived their parallel lives, but soon Euro-NOM's activities whittled down. Lapin departed to join PepSee, to be replaced by Alexey Lysenko, ex-Kacheli. In August 2000, after the South of Russia tour, Euro-NOM announced going into "indefinite vacation", and another N.O.M. dropped its Zhir-tag (which, as the band members insisted, had never been adopted officially).

In 2000 Terra Fantastica Publishers released A. Kagadeyev and S. Butuzov's book Чудовища (Monsters), two novels and a screenplay. The same year A. Liver (who by this time had released six solo albums) published his book Рельсы и шпалы (Rails and Ties).

In 2002 N.O.M.'s association with Caravan Records (which released the group's 3 LPs and two Liver's solo albums) resulted in a lucrative joint project when Caravan's boss Max Susloparov opened the Orlandina Club with NOM as residents and decorators. In May 2002 NOM's first movie, described a "fairytale thriller" Paseka came out, Kagadeyev-Sr. and Kopeikin credited as scriptwriters, Liver and Turist as the leading actors.

A renewed recording deal with SoLyd Records resulted in three studio albums: Экстракомпакт (2000), Очень отличный концерт (2001) and 8уе (2002), accompanied by three compilations: НОМ-15: 1987–2002 (2002), MP3 Коллекция (2002) and Russisches Schwein (2003). The 2004 Альбом реального искусства (The Album of Reality Art), using Russian oberiu poetry (Nikolay Oleynikov, Daniil Kharms and Korney Chukovsky among others) was released on NOM's own Yazbetz Records.

=== Reunion ===
The 20 April 2007 official reunion concert at the Port Club featured the Kagadeyev brothers, Liver, Turist, Lapin and Gusev. On 28 February 2009 N.O.M. performed at the Glavklub, playing songs from the forthcoming album. A week later the Moscow Ikra Club hosted the show. Originally titled Кирпич в живот (Brick into Stomach), it came out as Превыше всего (Above Everything) in October that year.

In 2010 the band (now joined by the founder member Sergey Butuzov) started a series of highly successful concerts, playing the material from In the Name of Reason and Gross albums. On 20 October Sergey Kagadeyev's N.O.M.-Euro gave a one-off concert, the first in 11 years, in Moscow Ikra Club. In April 2011 N.O.M. celebrated its 25th anniversary with two shows in Saint Petersburg. On 8 May 2013 the new album В Мире Животных (In the Animals' World) was released. Later that month Sergey Kagadeyev left the band. He died on 9 September 2014 from heart failure.

In October 2014 the studio album Семеро смертных (The Seven Mortals) was released, followed by a series of successful concert shows.

== N.O.M. lyrics and linguistics ==
The band became famous for their highly literary (somewhat baffling, occasionally offensive, but always hilarious) lyrics, which continued the tradition of Russian surrealism made famous by authors like Nikolai Gogol and Daniil Harms, making use of the Soviet propaganda clichés, elements of folklore, sci-fi, clips from films and children's songs. NOM songs' characters have been compared to those of E. T. A. Hoffmann and Mikhail Zoshchenko. Some of the N.O.M. lyrics sound indecipherable even to a Russian listener. Words like "ainu", "кutzurubki", "aurelui" are (according to the band's official site's FAQ) of romany origin. Another enigmatic word, "ljuy", is claimed to be "a Romanian suffix, good for any a Russian word too" – a statement never meant to be taken, apparently, at its face value.

The text of "U Karytzu Mashek" is based on an obscure "riddle without any answer" allegedly found by the Russian folklorist Pyotr Kireyevsky. The name for one of the most outlandish N.O.M. characters, extraterrestrial priest Odlopez has been attributed to Sergey Butuzov (it turned out later that Stanisław Lem used the name in one of his novels).

== Non-musical projects ==
Andrey Kagadeyev is the author of two novels (Страус and Танец Ханумана, both included in compilation Чудовища, "Monsters", in 1999) co-written with Sergey Butuzov. Kagadeyev, a published poet, is a member of a designer collective MW Art.

Since 1991 N.O.M. have been releasing short films; the last (and the 8th) of them is Коричневый век русской литературы (The Brown Age of the Russian Literature, 2008). In May 2002 N.O.M.'s first movie Пасека (Paseka, Apiary) was released. It was followed by the second, Геополипы (Geopolypy, a portmanteau of "geopolitics" and "polyps"), in February 2004.

In July 2009 Andrey Kagadeev told the online press-conference held by Lenta.ru that the major film, a "cosmic epic" called Звёздный ворс (Zviozdny Vors, lit. "Starry Fluff", a pun on "Star Wars") was in the process of being made, featuring, alongside various N.O.M. members, Shnur (Leningrad, Rubl), Mikhalok (Lyapis Trubetskoy's frontman) and Oleg Skripka of Vopli Vidopliassova. The film, completed in 2011, was premiered on 20 December 2012 in Saint Petersburg and on 16 January 2013 in Moscow.

== Discography ==
=== Albums ===
- Брутто (Brutto, 1989)
- К Чортям собачьим (K Chortya′m Soba′tchjim, To Dog's Hell, 1989)
- Супердиск (Superdisc, 1992)
- Сенька-Мосгаз (Se′nhka MosGha′z, Senhka from MosGaz, 1994)
- Ultracompact (1995)
- Звуки Северной столицы (Zvu′ki Se′vernoi Stoly′tzy, Sounds of the Northern Capital, 1995)
- Live is Game (1996)
- Во имя разума (Voi′mia Ra′zuma, In the Name of Reason, 1996)
- Euro (1997)
- Жир (Zhir, Fat, 1997)
- live жир (1998)
- Extracompact (2000)
- Очень отличный концерт (Otchen Otli′chny Kontse′rt, A Very Excellent Concert, 2001)
- Жбан дурака (Zhban Duraka, The Fool's Zhban, 2001)
- 8 ye (2002)
- Пасека (Pa′seka, Apiary, 2002)
- Н.О.М. 15 (2002)
- Russisches Schwein (2003)
- Альбом реального искусства (Alhbom Rea′lhnogo Isku′sstva, The Album of Reality Art, 2004)
- Более мощный (Bo′leje Mo′schny, More Powerful, 2005)
- Превыше всего (Prevy'she Vsego, Above Everything, 2009)
- В мире животных (V mire zhivotnyh, In the world of animals, 2013)
- Семеро смертных (Semero smertnyh, Seven mortals, 2014)
- Live in Adva (CD + DVD, 2015)
- Оттепель (Snowbreak, 2016)
- Я тебя услышал (Ya tebya uslyshal, I Heard You, 2018)
- Весёлая карусель (Vesyolaya karusel', 2020)
- МАЛГИЛ (MALGIL, 2021)
- Воздух общий (Vozdukh obshchiy, 2022)
- Сволочь (Svoloch', 2025)

== Films ==
- Хозяева СССР, или Обезьянье рыло / Owners of USSR or monkey snout (1991)
- Сделано в Европе / Made in Europe (1996)
- Жбан дурака / Jug of fool (2000)
- Пасека / Apiary (2002)
- Геополипы / Geopolyps (2004)
- Белорусская быль (2006)
- Фантомас снимает маску / Fantômas removes the mask (2007)
- Коричневый век русской литературы / Brown century of Russian literature (2008)
- Звёздный ворс / Star Worms (2012)
