= Layer (film) =

2022 Russian crime drama film

- Directed by: Stanislav Sapachyov
- Written by: Stanislav Sapachyov
- Produced by: Anzhelika Pashkova; Svetlana Gordeyeva
- Starring: Vladimir Vdovichenkov; Kirill Käro; Viktoriya Bogatyryova; Sergey Makovetsky
- Cinematography: Aleksandr Kuznetsov; Ivan Mamonov
- Edited by: Aleksandr Khachko
- Music by: Gleb Matveychuk
- Production company: Studio 12
- Distributed by: Planeta Inform Film Distribution
- Release date: April 14, 2022 (Russia)
- Running time: 102 minutes
- Country: Russia
- Language: Russian

Layer (Russian: Пласт, romanized: Plast) is a 2022 Russian crime drama film directed by Stanislav Sapachyov. It stars Vladimir Vdovichenkov and Kirill Käro. The tape is available for viewing exclusively in the KION online cinema from April 1, 2022. It was theatrically released on April 14, 2022, by Planeta Inform Film Distribution.

== Plot ==
Yevgeny Sergeyevich sets a difficult task for Slava and Zhenya: they need to sell a contraband sun stone, as a result of which Zhenya has an idea how to quickly become who he dreamed of being since childhood. But is he capable to do so and will he be able to maintain friendship with Slava?

== Cast ==
- Vladimir Vdovichenkov as Slava
- Kirill Käro as Zhenya
- Viktoriya Bogatyryova as Olga
- Sergey Makovetsky as Yevgeny Sergeyevich
- Emila Yegorova as Dasha
- Yevgeniya Tereshchenko as Katya
- Ameliya Kulikova as Anya

== Production ==
Filming took place in the city of Kaliningrad and nearby resort towns of Svetlogorsk, Zelenogradsk and Yantarny, Kaliningrad Oblast, Russia.
