= Satisfy =

Satisfy may refer to:

- Satisfy (horse) (foaled 1984), a New Zealand Thoroughbred racehorse
- "Satisfy" (song), by Nero, 2014
- "Satisfy", a song by Jerry Cantrell from Boggy Depot, 1998
- "Satisfy", a song by Calvin Harris and Jazzy, 2026
- Satisfy, an album by the Cover Girls, 1996
- Satisfy, an album by Kathryn Scott, 2004

== See also ==
- "Satisfya", a 2013 song by Imran Khan
- Satisfaction (disambiguation)
- Satisfiability, a property of some mathematical formulas
