= The Orange Sky =

2006 Ukrainian film

- Directed by: Oleksandr Kyryenko
- Written by: Yuriy Butsov, Svitlana Rudzynska
- Produced by: Yaroslav Mendus, Yuriy Butsov
- Starring: Lidia Obolenska; Oleksandr Lymarev; Ksenia Belaya; Mykola Chindiaikin; Oleksiy Vertynskyi; Oleksandr Moroz
- Cinematography: Uluhbek Khamraev
- Music by: Okean Elzy, Tartak, Luk, Nino Katamadze
- Distributed by: Cinema Production
- Release date: 2006
- Running time: 91 minutes
- Country: Ukraine
- Languages: Russian; Ukrainian
- Budget: $ 500,000

The Orange Sky (Russian: «Оранжевое небо»; Ukrainian: «Помаранчеве небо», romanized: Pomarancheve nebo). This film was made in 2006, after the Orange Revolution which took place in Ukraine. It was directed by Oleksandr Kyryenko with the Cinema Production.

== Mini-Synopsis ==
The movie tells of a love story of two greatly different young people. The heroine, Ivanna is a young girl with ambitiously nationalistic beliefs in the power of democracy. She expresses her patriotism by voicing, often protesting the present regime of Ukraine in the favor of revolutionary ideals. Mark, the protagonist, on the other hand is a privileged son of a government official whose life is filled with excitement from being able to get everything his heart desires. The two meet in the midst of a national crisis when a series of massive protests and political events were unfolding in Ukraine. Of course with the meeting, the two fall in love forever changing each other's paths. Mark is unwillingly becoming estranged from his comfortable life and seeks to obtain understanding of what drives Ivana and her friends to stand up to authority. Eventually two are united in one cause: fighting for a better future for their country. The movie uses a semi-reenactment of the actual events of the winter in Ukraine during the Orange Revolution. The protests, the rioting, the cold weather are all there.

== Production ==
=== Estimate ===
The cost of the film was ₴ 2.5 million ($0.5 million).

=== Filming and casting ===
Work on the film began in late April 2005. Filming lasted 28 days and began on November 6, 2005. Filming took place in stages in Kyiv, Kamianets-Podilskyi, and the Crimea. The episode showing the Orange Revolution on the Maidan was filmed on the anniversary of the 2005 Revolution. The then Prime Minister Yuriy Yekhanurov, who did not take part in the revolutionary events, appears in the frame. More than ten thousand folk talents passed the selection "sieve" in order to get into the cast. Vinnytsia resident Lidia Obolenska took on the leading female role. According to Obolonska, it was very difficult for her to play the role of her character, as she had a poor command of the Ukrainian language. Obolonskaya was forced to specifically invite her Ukrainian-speaking friend from Lviv to speak to her in Ukrainian for a few days, which was to help Obolenskaya improve her spoken Ukrainian. In the end, according to Obolenskaya, she is still "akala" in the film.

== Cast ==
- Lidia Obolenska as Ivanna
- Oleksandr Ihnatusha as Ivanna's father
- Oleksandr Lymarev as Mark Zadukha
- Ksenia Belaia as Asia
- Mykola Chindiaikin as Mark's father
- Ville Haapasalo as Fedia
- Oleksiy Vertynskyi as Inokentiy Valeriyanovych
- Viktor Yushchenko as himself
- Vitaliy Klychko as himself
- Oleksandr Moroz as himself
