= Insignificant Details of a Random Episode =

- Film poster
- Russian: Незначительные подробности случайного эпизода
- Directed by: Mikhail Mestetsky
- Written by: Natalya Nazarova
- Produced by: Sergey Kornikhin
- Starring: Kirill Käro; Miriam Sekhon; Ilya Zaslavskiy
- Cinematography: Timofei Parshikov
- Release date: June 2011
- Country: Russia
- Language: Russian

Insignificant Details of a Random Episode (Russian: Незначительные подробности случайного эпизода) is a 2011 Russian comedy short film directed by Mikhail Mestetsky.

== Plot ==
The two trains stopped opposite each other and strange relationships began to develop between the passengers.

== Cast ==
- Kirill Käro
- Miriam Sekhon
- Ilya Zaslavskiy
