= Kirill Käro =

Estonian actor (born 1975)

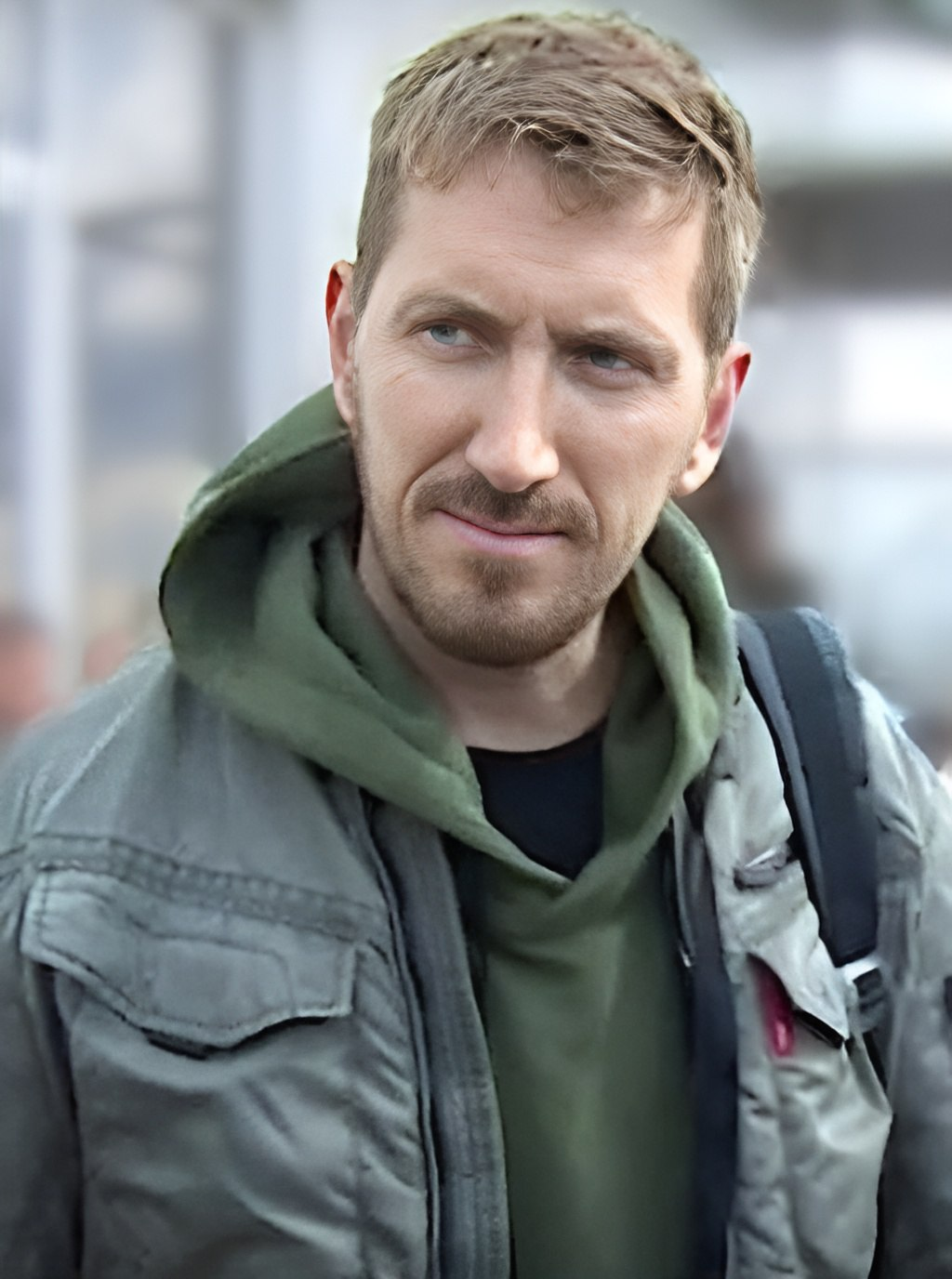
- Käro in 2019
- Born: Kirill Valerievich Käro; 24 February 1975 (age 51); Tallinn, then part of Estonian SSR, Soviet Union
- Citizenship: Estonia; Russia
- Occupation: Actor
- Years active: 1997–present

Kirill Valeryevich Käro (Russian: Кири́лл Вале́рьевич Кя́ро; born 24 February 1975) is an Estonian-Russian actor. He is best known for playing the lead character in 32 episodes of The Sniffer (2013–2017), as George Safronov in 16 episodes of the Netflix sci-fi series Better than Us (2019), and as Sergey in the thriller series To the Lake (2020).

== Biography ==
=== Early years ===
Kirill Käro was born in Tallinn, Estonian SSR, Soviet Union. His father was a sea captain of mixed Estonian-Russian descent, and his Russian mother was a teacher. His first cousin, once removed, is actor Volli Käro. After graduating from secondary school at Lasnamäe in 1992, Käro entered a five-year acting course at the Boris Shchukin Theatre Institute in Moscow. Following graduation in 1997, he continued to work at the Boris Shchukin Theatre Institute under the mentorship of Armen Dzhigarkhanyan.

Käro returned to Tallinn in 1999, acting at the Russian Theatre for five years, before going back to Moscow to the Praktika Theatre in 2004.

=== Career ===
Käro's career in film and television began in 2008 with various small parts. In 2013, he landed the leading role in The Sniffer, for which he won the Association of Film and TV Producers award in the category Best Actor.

In 2019, he played the main role of George Safronov in sixteen episodes of the Netflix Russian android thriller series Better than Us.

In 2020, Käro starred as Sergey in the lead role of the Russian television series To the Lake. The show was acquired by Netflix and broadcast in October 2020.

== Selected filmography ==
=== Film ===
List of film appearances, with year, title, and role shown
Year	Title	Role	Notes
2009	Help Gone Mad		
2011	Insignificant Details of a Random Episode		Short
2011	Boris Godunov	Dmitry Andreevich Kurbsky	
2015	The Fencer	Aleksei	
2022	Plast	Zhenya	
2022	Who's There?	Pyotr	
2022	Terrible Dad	Nikita Osipov	
2022	Dalyokiye blizkiye		
2022	Pryamoy efir	Alexandr	

=== Television ===
List of television appearances, with year, title, and role shown
Year	Title	Role	Notes
2007	Liquidation	Slava	2 episodes
2013–17	The Sniffer	The Sniffer	24 episodes
2015	Izmeny	Kirill	16 episodes
2017–19	Psikhologini	Mikhail Slutskiy	22 episodes
2018–19	Better than Us	Georgy Nikolaevich Safronov	16 episodes
2019	Rasplata	Nikita Dolin	8 episodes
2019	To the Lake	Sergey	8 episodes
2020–21	Passengers	Andrey	8 episodes
2025	Konstantinopol	Borodaevsky	9 episodes
