= Viktor Shamirov =

Russian film and TV director

- Born: Viktor Valeryevich Shamirov; 24 May 1966 (age 60); Rostov-on-Don, Soviet Union (now Russia)
- Citizenship: Moscow
- Occupations: film director, screenwriter, producer, actor

Viktor Valeryevich Shamirov (Russian: Виктор Валерьевич Шамиров; born 24 May 1966) is a Russian film director, screenwriter, producer and actor.

== Biography ==
Victor was born in Rostov-on-Don. He served in the army, after which he entered the Faculty of Mechanics and Mathematics. He worked in the theater Epos as a handyman. He put on the lights, mounted the scenery and rehearsed with the actors. In 1992 he moved to Moscow, where he graduated from the directing department and began working as a theater director and actor. Since 2006, he has been directing films.

== Filmography (selected) ==
- Dikari (2006)
- The Practice of Beauty (2011)
- And Here's What's Happening to Me (2012)
- Game of Truth (2013)
- Directly Kakha (2020)
