= Satisfaction (2010 film) =

- Film poster
- Russian: Сатисфакция
- Directed by: Anna Matison
- Written by: Evgeniy Grishkovets; Anna Matison
- Produced by: Evgeniy Grishkovets; Aleksandr Orlov; Irina Yutkina
- Starring: Denis Burgazliev; Yevgeni Grishkovetz; Oleg Malyshev; Yuriy Bazilev; Aleksandr Bratenkov
- Cinematography: Andrey Zakablukovskiy
- Music by: Maksim Sergeyev; Borislav Strulev
- Release date: October 2010 (Pacific Meridian)
- Country: Russia
- Language: Russian

Satisfaction (Russian: Сатисфакция) is a 2010 Russian drama film directed by Anna Matison.

== Plot ==
The film tells about the influential businessman Alexander, who after a working day, together with his assistant Dmitry goes to a restaurant in which there are no visitors. They spend time in the company of silent waiters and numerous bottles of alcohol. And suddenly the door is locked from the inside...

== Cast ==
- Denis Burgazliev as Dima
- Yevgeni Grishkovetz as Sasha
- Oleg Malyshev as Restaurant's owner
- Yuriy Bazilev
- Aleksandr Bratenkov
- Igor Chirva as Civil engineer
- Anna Druzhinina as The seller in jewelry store
- Mihail Meshakin as Waiter
- Aleksey Orlov as Restaurant's worker
- Anastasiya Shinkarenko as Nastya, dishwasher
