= Star Worms =

- Film poster
- Russian: Звёздный ворс
- Directed by: Andrey Kagadeev; Nikolay Kopeykin
- Written by: Andrey Kagadeev; Nikolay Kopeykin
- Produced by: Igor Eysmont; Andrey Kagadeev; Nikolay Kopeykin
- Starring: Andrey Kagadeev; Nikolay Kopeykin; Siarhei Mikhalok; Roman Maksimov; Svetlana Gumanovskaya; Sergey Shnurov
- Cinematography: Valeriy Hattin
- Edited by: Andrey Kagadeev; Vladimir Medvedev
- Music by: Nikolay Gusev; Aleksey Mostiev
- Release date: 28 June 2012
- Country: Russia
- Language: Russian

Star Worms (Russian: Звёздный ворс, romanized: Zvyozdniy vors) is a 2012 Russian comedy film directed by Andrey Kagadeev and Nikolay Kopeykin of experimental rock band N.O.M.

== Plot ==
The film tells about a professor who works in the scientific town of Ishtym in Siberia and studies the Universe. Suddenly in 2221, he made a discovery that changed all ideas about the structure of the universe. Envious colleagues did not like this, but there were those who decided to help the professor build the first new type of interplanetary ship in history so that the professor could prove his theory.

== Cast ==
- Andrey Kagadeev as Professor Chasharskiy / Obezyanoid
- Nikolay Kopeykin as German Borisovich Ryap / Obezyanoid
- Siarhei Mikhalok as Bogdan Sherstyuk (as Sergei Mikhalok)
- Roman Maksimov as Fyodor Zhishinnikov
- Svetlana Gumanovskaya
- Sergey Shnurov
- Prokhor Alekseev as Irshat Lodzhiev (Khavron)
- Aleksandr Laertskiy as Yuliy Gogarin (Yuri Gagarin)
- Yuliya Vorobyova as Nykholay / Robot / Ishtym Market Sellers and Customers / Obezyanoid
- Viktoriya Leskova as Nykholay / Obezyanoid / The Werewolf Clown
