= Aleksandra Petrova =

Russian poet and writer (born 1964)

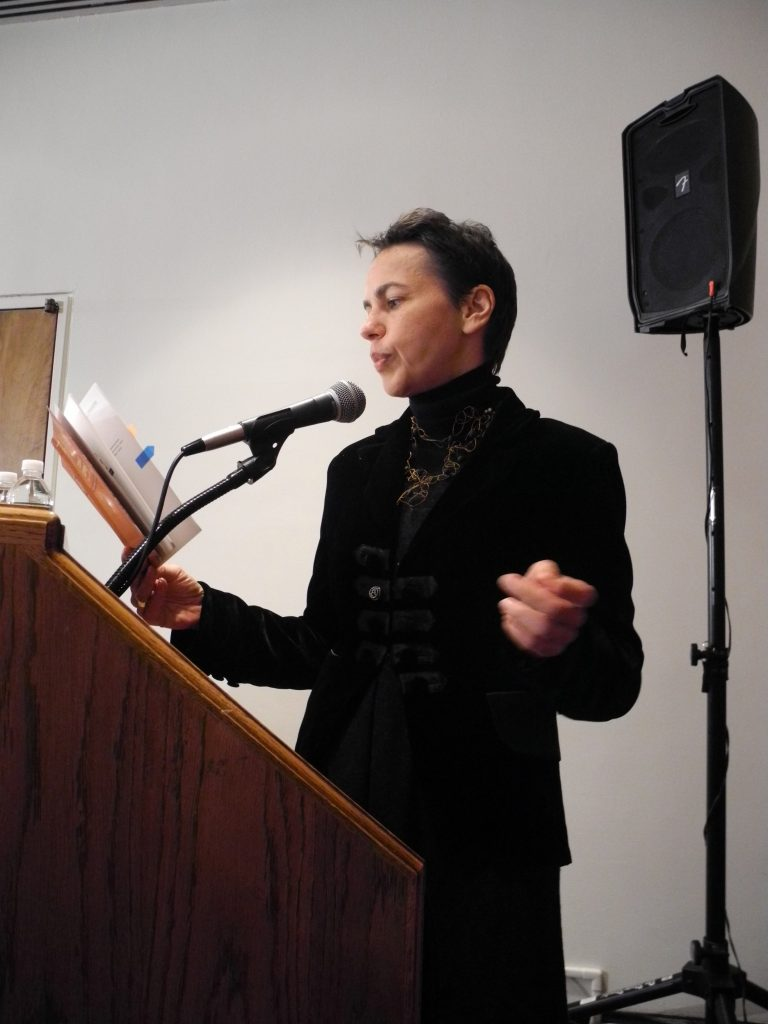
Alexandra Petrova reads at the Heyman Center at Columbia University in 2015.

Alexandra Gennadievna Petrova (Russian: Александра Геннадиевна Петрова) (born 30 April 1964 in Leningrad) is a Russian poet and writer. She graduated from the Faculty of Philology at the University of Tartu. She lived in Jerusalem Israel from 1993 to 1998 and has lived in Rome since 1998. She was a finalist for the Andrei Bely Prize in 1999 and in 2008 and a Laureate of the Prize in 2016 for her novel Appendix.

Her poetry and prose have been translated into Italian, English, Chinese, Portuguese, German, Slovak, and Hebrew.

== Biography ==
Alexandra Petrova was born in Saint Petersburg, and she studied at the University of Tartu. She conducts research on Leonid Dobycin, a Russian narrator from the first half of the twentieth century, and his influence can be seen in her work.

In 1990, she began to publish her poems, first in magazines of clandestine origin (samizdat), such as Mitin zhurnal, then also in émigré Russian language magazines, such as "Kontinent." In 1994, she published her first book of poetry, Liniia otryva ("Point of Detachment") with Mitin zhurnal. In 2000, her collection of poetry and prose Vid na zhitelstvo ("Living Permit", "Residence Permit", or "A View on Existence") was a finalist for the Andrei Bely Prize and published by NLO of Moscow.

In 2003, Petrova published Dolly's Shepards, a Philosophical Operetta in Ten Scenes in both Russian and Italian. In 2005, Crocetti Editore published her poetry collection Altri Fuochi ("Other Fireworks", "Other Fires", or "Other Lights") with an introduction by Stephanie Sandler. In 2008, her third book of poetry Tolko derevia ("Only Trees") was published. It was a finalist for the Andrei Bely prize. The next year, it was translated into Serbian by Miriana Petrovich, and went on to win the first prize at the Tre'ci Trg Festival in Belgrade.

Petrova worked as a curator of the 21st century Italian Film Festival in Krasnoyarsk in 2009, with sponsorship from the Prochorov foundation. In 2011, she won the Special Prize at the Torino Film Festival's Sixth Annual National Mother Language Literary Competition for her short story A Dog Day, written in Italian. That same year, she participated in the International Writing Program Fall Residency at the University of Iowa in Iowa City, IA, and was a resident at the Island Institute in Sitka, Alaska.

Petrova participated in Your Language My Ear, a poetry symposium dedicated to contemporary Russian poetry and its English translation, in 2015, during which she read and translated her works.

In 2016, NLO published her first novel, Appendix, which they featured in their special column "The Book as an Event" in September of that year. It received the Andrei Bely Prize in the same year and was a finalist for the Nos Prize of 2017. Appendix appeared also in the long lists of the Big Book Award and the Alexander Piatigorsky Prize.

Petrova's poetry, translations, and prose have been published in the main Russian literary magazines: Znamya, Zvezda, and Zerkalo. She has collaborated with the Russian magazine Translit and the Italian magazines Poesia, which featured her on the December 2002 issue cover, and Nazione Indiana, as well as other international magazines.

Petrova's work has been featured in several anthologies, including Crossing Centuries: the New Generation in Russian Poetry, An Anthology of Contemporary Russian Woman Poets, and Zoland Poetry: An Annual of Poems, Translations, and Interviews. Her work has also been featured in online journals, such as Jacket, Supplement, and Guernica.
