= The Practice of Beauty =

- Film poster
- Russian: Упражнения в прекрасном
- Directed by: Viktor Shamirov
- Written by: Yuriy Kutsenko; Viktor Shamirov; Konstantin Yushkevich
- Produced by: Yuriy Kutsenko; Viktor Shamirov; Konstantin Yushkevich
- Starring: Yuriy Kutsenko; Kseniya Radchenko; Pavel Savinkov; Viktor Shamirov; Konstantin Yushkevich
- Cinematography: Semyon Yakovlev
- Music by: Dmitry Katkhanov
- Release date: July 2011 (Riga IFF)
- Country: Russia
- Language: Russian

The Practice of Beauty (Russian: Упражнения в прекрасном) is a 2011 Russian comedy film directed by Viktor Shamirov.

== Plot ==
The film tells about the difficulties of theatrical life, star fever, a showdown with the producer, flirting in the living room...

== Cast ==
- Yuriy Kutsenko
- Kseniya Radchenko
- Pavel Savinkov
- Viktor Shamirov
- Konstantin Yushkevich
