= Ilya Zaslavskiy =

Russian politician

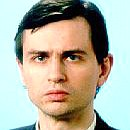
Ilya Zaslavskiy

Ilya Iosifovich Zaslavskiy (Russian Илья Иосифович Заславский; born January 31, 1960) is a Russian politician of the Perestroika era, activist and specialist for the rights of disabled people, and entrepreneur. He has held seats in the Congress of People's Deputies of the Soviet Union, State Duma of the Russian Federation, acted as deputy minister for the Russian Ministry of Land Policy, Construction, Housing and Utilities, and worked on the World Committee for the United Nations Decade of Disabled Persons.

== Early biography ==
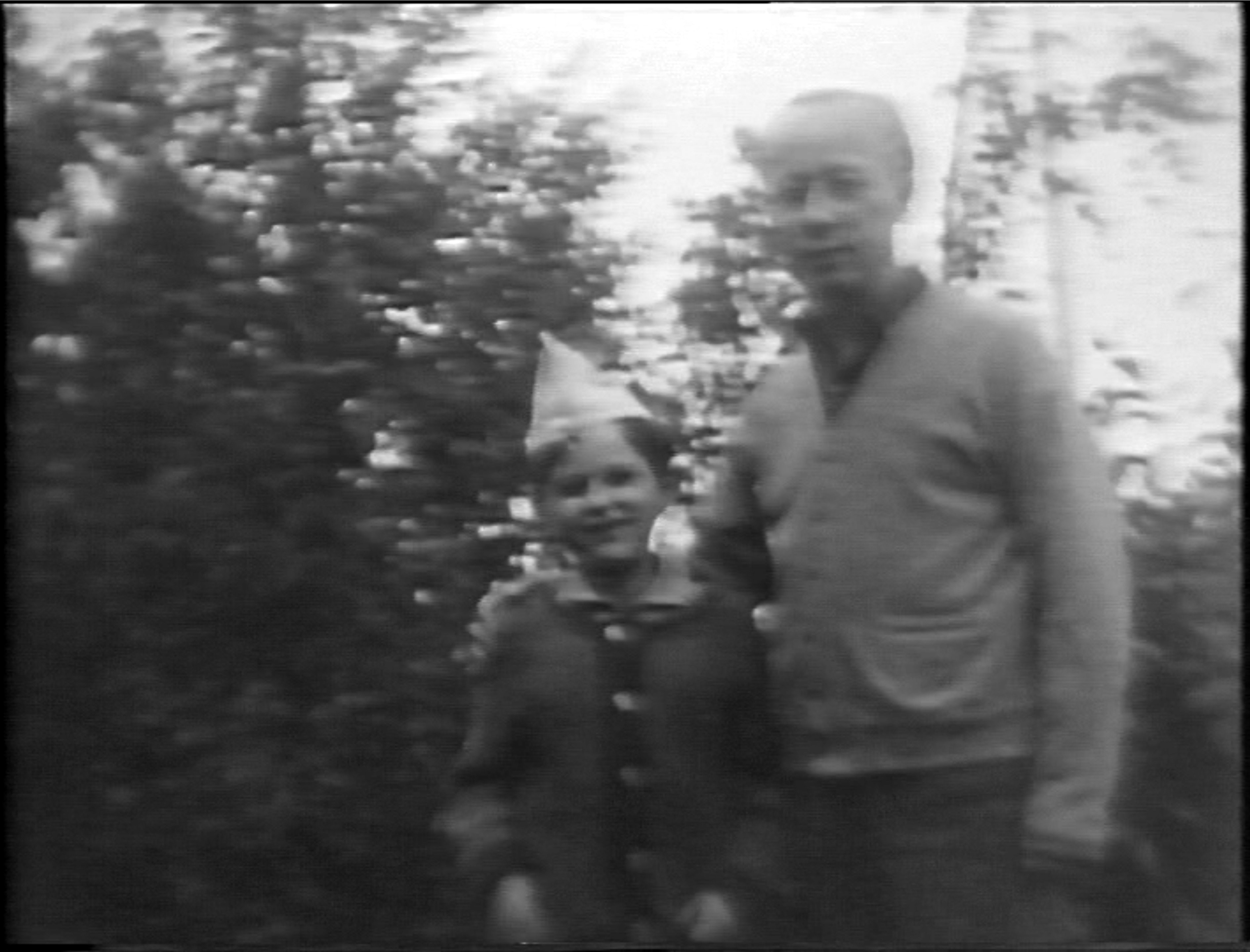
Ilya Zaslavskiy as a child with his father

Ilya Zaslavskiy was born on January 31, 1960, to Jewish parents Joseph and Emilia Zaslavskiy in Moscow. Due to a severe childhood illness, he could make only partial use of his legs and was unable to go to school. Instead, teachers came to teach Zaslavskiy at his home.

Contrary to the common practice of the period in the Soviet Union (as well as today's Russian Federation) to keep disabled persons in involuntary commitment at specialised boarding homes (Психоневрологический интернат, ПНИ), Zaslavskiy was able to study, acquiring the academic degree equivalent to a PhD (Candidate of Sciences) in 1985. As a researcher, he published more than 30 scientific works, including one book.

Already as a student, he gained journalistic experience. After graduating, he kept up contributions to the magazine Chemistry and Life while working at the Moscow State Textile University. Later, he focused completely on managing the business-like research laboratory he had established there, leading him to earn considerable income. Capitalist endeavours, however, were subject to harsh punishment in the communist Soviet Union (going as far as death penalty for foreign currency trading), meaning, even this state-authorised experimental attempt met pressure and strong resistance from university leadership.

After reading in a newspaper about Mikhail Gorbachev's constitutional revision of December 1, 1988 making democratic elections possible for the first time, Zaslavskiy decided to pursue a political career.

== Political career ==
=== Congress of People's Deputies ===
External images
- Nomination of Ilya Zaslavskiy for Congress of People's Deputies by the local Association of Disabled People in Moscow's October district (New Year's Eve 1988).
- Ilya Zaslavskiy meets electorate on multiple rallies on March 14, 1989. Also present: His daughter Nastya.

In 1988, Zaslavskiy was nominated to run for the Congress of People's Deputies of the Soviet Union by the local Association of Disabled People in Moscow's Oktyabrsky district. The nomination of an independent candidate attracted public attention.

Despite opposition by communist and nationalist forces, his demands – especially for recognition and inclusion of disabled people – and rhetoric appealed to a broad audience. He gathered prominent support, for instance by cosmonaut Georgy Grechko and human rights defender Andrei Sakharov, and at the election on March 26, 1989, Zaslavskiy took victory over the candidate of the Communist Party of the Soviet Union, TV host and anti-Semite Alexander Krutov.

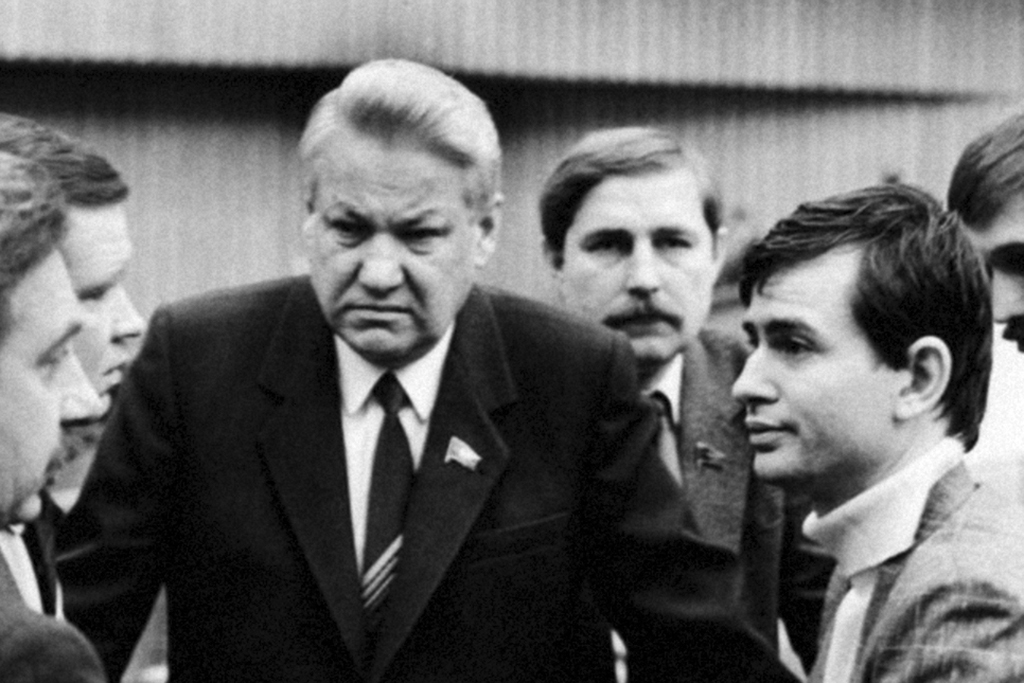
Boris Yeltsin (center) and Ilya Zaslavskiy (right to the fore) during People's Deputies Congress 1989

During the first People's Deputies Congress, Zaslavskiy proposed a comprehensive programme of measures to improve the life situation of disabled people within the USSR. Because of his support for radical economic reforms in opposition to the communist majority, he was not elected to the Supreme Soviet of the Soviet Union, but made vice chairman of the adjunct Committee for Veterans and Disabled instead, which was composed of Supreme Soviet members and regular People's Deputies in equal shares. From there, he was able to introduce and put into practice his demands (see also section Disability rights). During the course of 1989, he organised a trip of a Russian disabled skiers' team to Breckenridge in the United States.

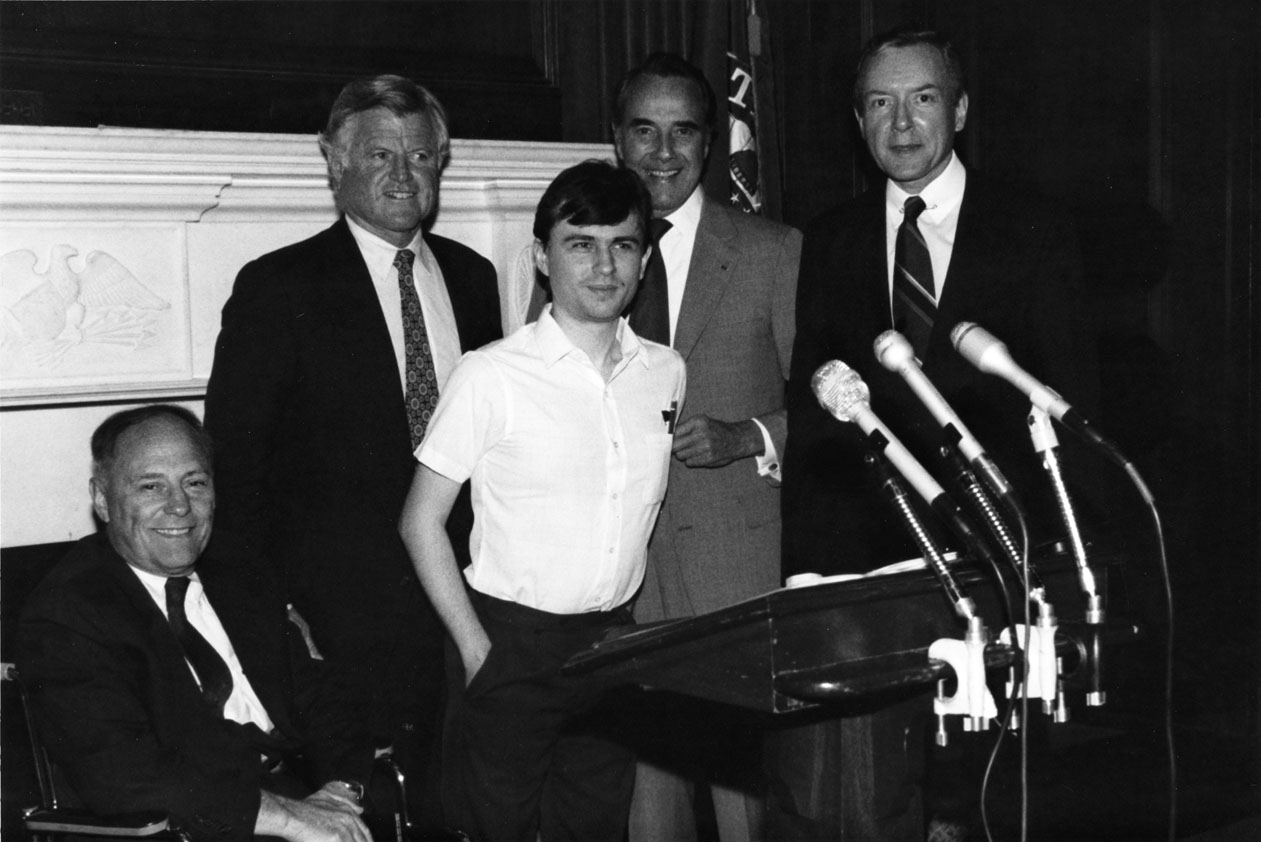
Ilya Zaslavskiy (center) with Alan Reich (left), Edward Kennedy (2nd from left) and Bob Dole (2nd from right)

His election to People's Deputies Congress had been received with great interest in America: The founder and chairman of the US National Organization on Disability, Alan A. Reich, had congratulated Ilya Zaslavskiy via phone call in April 1989; shortly after, Senator Bob Dole – himself a war-disabled veteran of WWII – invited the young people's deputy to Washington, D.C. On September 7, 1989, Zaslavskiy, Reich, Dole, and Edward Kennedy, who had sponsored the Americans with Disabilities Act in the United States Senate, met to discuss disability rights at the Capitol. Subsequently, Zaslavskiy was appointed to the World Committee for the United Nations Decade of Disabled Persons.

When back in Moscow, Ilya Zaslavskiy positioned himself as an opponent to the one-party rule of the Communist Party of the Soviet Union under Mikhail Gorbachev. David Remnick, for example, describes being witness to a scene on December 15, 1989, at the State Kremlin Palace, where Zaslavskiy literally stood up to Gorbatchev and "the fury in Gorbatchev's eyes" to demand a day of remembrance for Andrei Sakharov, a dissident who had died the day before.

=== Local elections ===
Despite such rhetorical acts of resistance, the leading members of the democratic opposition in the Soviet Union (organised in the countrywide movement Democratic Russia (Демократическая Россия)) were mostly powerless with regards to the national parliament. They focused, therefore, on local elections to gain influence. Zaslavskiy, one of the most commonly known and influential members of Democratic Russia, ran for election to his home district Oktyabrsky's council in 1990. As a proven entrepreneur, he promised to "build capitalism in one district" – a clear provocation to the state doctrine of "Socialism in one country".

Parallel to his own candidacy, Zaslavskiy boosted election campaigns all over Moscow: He had voters surveyed, circumvented the state-owned businesses' embargo to print pamphlets, asked psychologists to optimise publications, and advised candidates running in other districts on their campaigns. The measures taken showed effect, as Zaslavskiy was voted into office as district councilor, and was also made said council's chairman.

As the new district leader, Zaslavskiy lowered the hurdles to registration and publication of media products of all kinds, including dissident press. For the first time in the history of the Soviet Union, free sale of any print media was allowed. Furthermore, he made launching political parties legal and free in his district, setting a national precedent for a multi-party system. He had the communist party bureaus move to undesirable premises within the district's administration building, and demanded more power over decision-making from the central government, for example, personnel decisions at the local police force. He also kept the election promise of introducing capitalism. Within twelve months, 4,500 businesses had been founded in or moved to his district, which constituted approximately half of all private enterprises operating in Moscow at the time; tax revenue tripled to ₽250 million per year. Although unsuccessful in the intermediate-term, Zaslavskiy also attempted to set up a real estate market.

Due to mounting opposition by the general public to his capitalist reforms, as well as ambiguities regarding governance structures, Zaslavskiy stepped down from his position as a district leader but kept some influence as commissioner of the mayor.

=== August Coup ===
External image
- Soviet President Mikhail Gorbatchev delivers a speech at the funeral service for the deceased of August 21, 1991. Also pictured: Ilya Zaslavskiy.

From August 19–21, 1991, an attempted coup d'état took place when conservative functionaries and orthodox communists tried to take power in Moscow by force of arms, taking into detention the incumbent president Gorbatchev at his Crimea dacha. The coup failed, and Gorbatchev stayed in power de jure. De facto, however, he lost control over the Soviet Union: The recently elected president of the Russian Soviet Federative Socialist Republic, Boris Yeltsin, came out against the plotters and in favor of Gorbatchev, and barricaded up in the White House. At the same time, he seized local power regardless, and later had the CPSU banned (which was Gorbatchev's and the putschists' party at the same time). Days later, on August 24, 1991, the Ukrainian Soviet Socialist Republic declared itself independent from the Soviet Union.

Ilya Zaslavskiy, as one of the leaders of Democratic Russia, positioned himself clearly as anti-communist and pro-Yeltsin, who had been elected democratically (see also section Political positions). During the coup attempt, Zaslavskiy joined the defenders of the White House, together with other celebrities like cellist Mstislav Rostropovich.

In one last try to keep the Soviet States in a union, Mikhail Gorbatchev resigned as General Secretary of the CPSU on August 24, 1991, and asked the hastily summoned 5th Congress of People's Deputies to suspend the central government and constitution of the Soviet Union, as well as to dissolve itself. His aim was to stabilise the situation by shifting power to the local executive powers. However, he was not able to organise the required majority for this undertaking. Ilya Zaslavskiy, who was known for his informal conduct at the time (see also section Trivia), commented on the entrenched situation as follows: "It's not correct to say Congress was put on its knees. This Congress was never off its knees in the first place". In allusion to the dissolution of the Russian Constituent Assembly by the Bolsheviks in 1918 ("The guard is tired"), he stated that "it's not the guards who are tired, it's the people".

On September 5, 1991, the Congress of the Soviet Union adjourned itself. Zaslavskiy, who in this season was a member of the Supreme Council, continued his parliamentary work past that date, until the Congress was finally dissolved on December 26, 1991. This marked his last day as a People's Deputy, since in the successor organisation, the Congress of People's Deputies of the Russian SFSR, Zaslavskiy did not occupy a seat. This Congress was replaced with the State Duma by referendum after Boris Yeltsin had dissolved the chamber unconstitutionally during the 1993 constitutional crisis.

=== State Duma ===
On December 12, 1993, the first national elections in the Russian Federation, legal successor to the Soviet Union, took place. Ilya Zaslavskiy ran for the bloc Russia's Choice, a coalition of conservative and liberal parties. Russia's Choice became the second strongest force, and achieved 15.51% of votes as well as 64 seats, one of which was taken by Zaslavskiy. Political aims of the bloc were the creation of a lean government and good conditions for entrepreneurial growth, as well as protecting private ownership and democratic freedoms – in short: "Freedom, Ownership, Legality".

As member of the parliament, Zaslavskiy regularly spoke on industrial, construction, and housing issues. He drafted or supported laws introducing a national land registry, providing housing subsidies, and creating a securities market. He also passed an amendment to keep the government from taxing lawyers the same as industrial enterprises, which had the potential to weaken the Russian legal profession as a whole. For this, he joined forces with his communist opponent Anatoly Lukyanov.

Zaslavskiy stood again as a candidate in the 1995 elections, this time for the bloc Democratic Choice of Russia – United Democrats. The bloc's personnel was essentially identical to Russia's Choice, including the leader Yegor Gaidar. The United Democrats' results, however, fell short of the electoral threshold on national level, and gained only nine direct mandates on district level due to strong competition by the liberal party Yabloko. Zaslavskiy did not achieve a seat in the parliament.

=== Executive ===
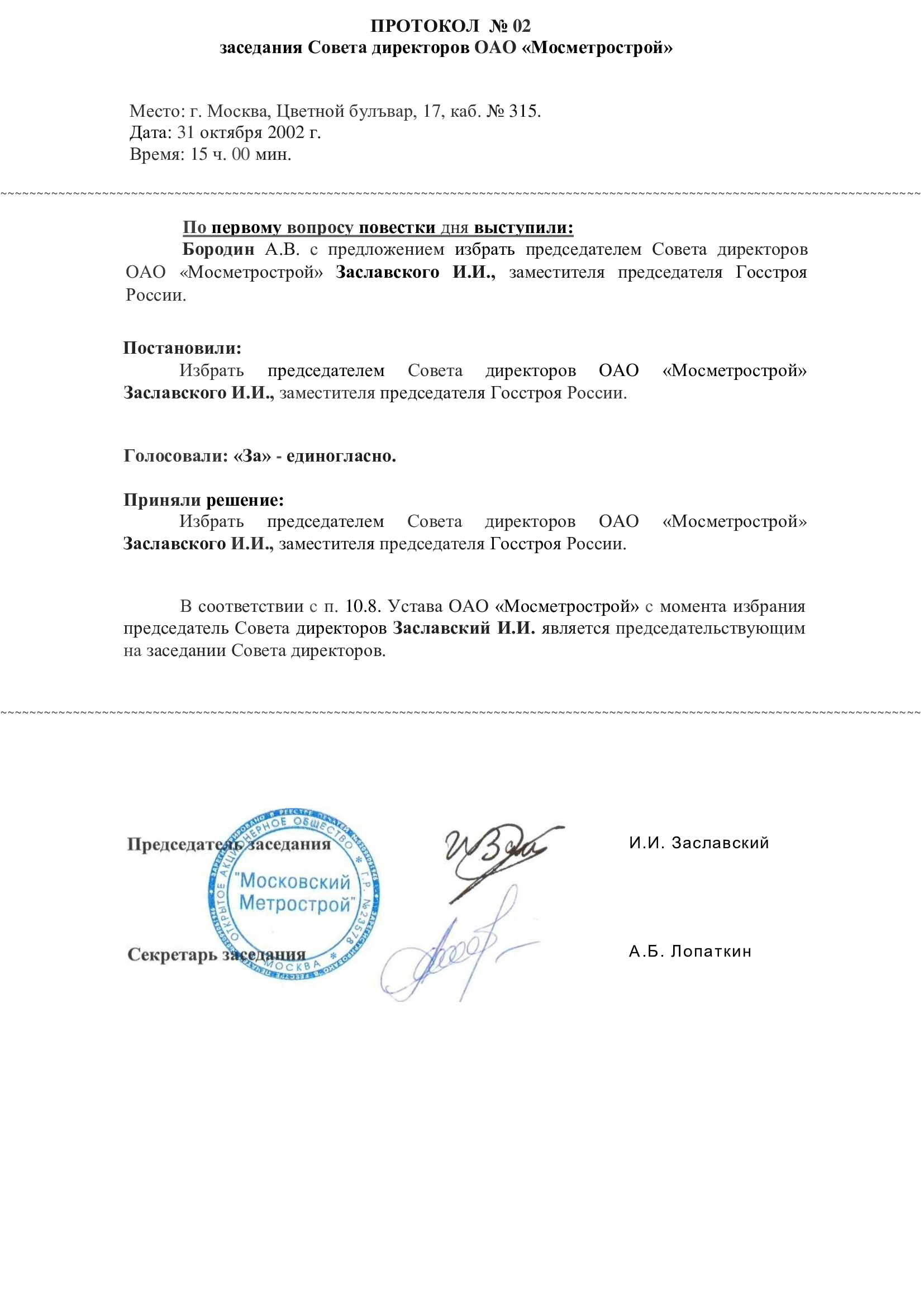
Certificate of appointment for Ilya Zaslavskiy as chairman of the managing board (Совет директоров) of Mosmetrostroy

After the dismissal of the entire cabinet of ministers by Yeltsin in March 1998, Zaslavskiy was appointed deputy minister for the Russian Ministry of Land Policy, Construction, Housing and Utilities (Минземстроя РФ) under Ilya Yushanov, and after that, deputy chairman of the Federal Agency for Construction and Housing and Utilities (Госстрой РФ) under Anvar Shamuzarov. He was dismissed from this position in 2003 and headed the board of directors for the OAO Mosmetrostroy, which built the Moscow Metro.

Since then, Zaslavskiy has spent most of his time as an entrepreneur, expert, and business consultant, mostly in Russia and, since 2014, also in Germany.

== Views and legacy ==
=== Political positions ===
In his Russian homeland, as well as internationally, Zaslavskiy garnered attention with his analyses and confident positioning, mainly opposing nationalist and totalitarian political ideologies. In a speech for the National Endowment for Democracy, the then-30-year-old set out in detail his assessments of the Soviet society and the political processes surrounding the collapse of the Soviet Union.

==== Anti-communist ====
In his speech, Zaslavskiy held the communist regime responsible for the "schizophren[ic]" state of the Soviet civil society, which had been a result of the October Revolution. The "machine of [the] communist regime" had broken up stable social structures and stifled the society's ability to evolve; consequently only enabling the Nomenklatura to stay in power and act as political Avantgarde. In default of political parties and resilient social networks, the individual had deteriorated to what was sarcastically called Homo Sovieticus. In Zaslavskiy's view, this "homogenous, destructur[ed]" state of the society was not normal and created a demand for top-down leadership, fostering fascist tendencies.

==== Perestroika ====
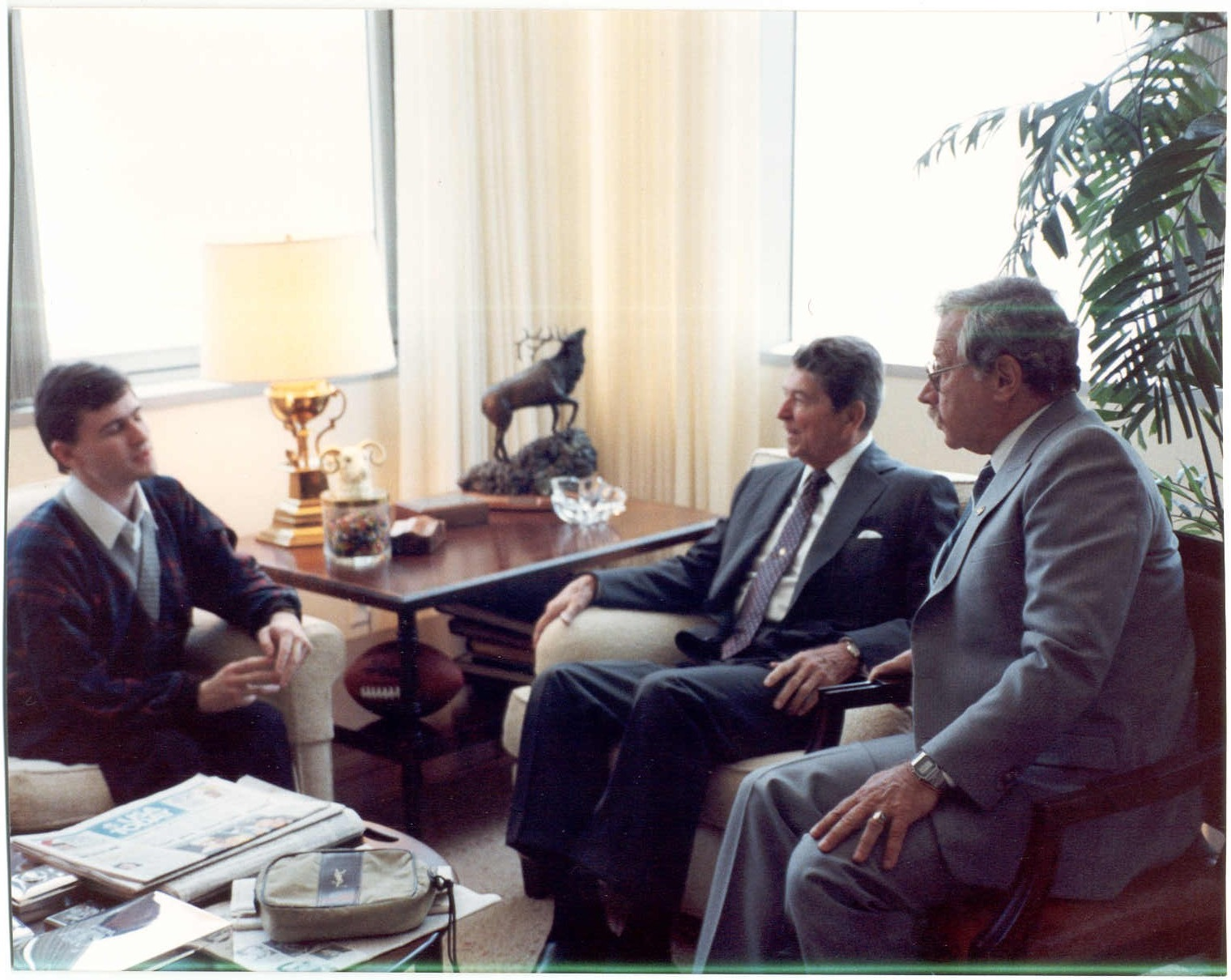
Ilya Zaslavskiy, Ronald Reagan, and Si Frumkin 1990 during a meeting in Los Angeles

According to Zaslavskiy, Ronald Reagan had been a co-author of Perestroika, the process of modernising Soviet society generally credited to Mikhail Gorbachev alone. Reagan's tough approach had provoked changes to the communist system, such as Gorbatchev's electoral reform, for example. The emergence of strong opposition in the Baltic states, as well as Russia, in democratic elections had made restructuring the Soviet Union, as proposed by Gorbachev during the 28th party convention of the CPSU in July 1990 in form of the Union of Soviet Sovereign Republics, inevitable. Although broad sections of the communist party opposed the reforms, these reforms had been absolutely necessary – a new phenomenon for the Soviet society. This fact, combined with the economic need for quick decisionmaking, had enabled Boris Yeltsin to activate the internal opposition within the CPSU, and to force the party to decide between Gorbachev's totalitarian and Yeltsin's democratic approach.

Zaslavskiy's assessment of the situation at the 28th party convention of the CPSU was shared especially by German political observers of the time. His statement about Reagan as a co-author of Perestroika is often quoted in the US American press. Once asked about the long journey to a personal meeting with Reagan, Zaslavskiy said: "I would travel a week, a month, just to shake his hand".

=== Social issues ===
==== Disability rights ====
Being disabled himself, Ilya Zaslavskiy advocated persistently for disability rights. His public demands, including a basic pension, inclusion into the education system and public transport system, as well as physical rehabilitation, laid the foundation for the developments of the next two decades in his home country:

The draft developed under his guidance in the Committee for Veterans and Disabled of the Supreme Soviet was adopted in 1990 as the law On the Basic Principles of Social Protection of Disabled Persons in the USSR by the Congress. Although the Dissolution of the Soviet Union delayed the implementation, progress did not stop, and the law moved back to attention named On Social Protection of Disabled Persons in the Russian Federation in 1995, adopted by the State Duma, again with Zaslavskiy's vote. Its guidelines were amended by the Federal List of Rehabilitation Measures, Technical Means of Rehabilitation and Services Provided to Persons with Disabilities in 2005.

As a member of the World Committee for the United Nations Decade of Disabled Persons, which lasted from 1982 to 1993, Zaslavskiy worked out the Standard Rules on the Equalization of Opportunities for Persons with Disabilities, which were resolved on December 20, 1993, and that constituted the precursor of the UN Convention on the Rights of Persons with Disabilities, adopted in 2006.

==== The role of Jews within society ====
In the late Russian Empire and the Soviet Union, especially under Leonid Brezhnev, strong antisemitic prejudice and discrimination prevailed in society and government (see also article History of the Jews in the Soviet Union). The Zaslavskiy family, too, were affected by this antisemitism: Ilya and his parents were marked as "yevrei" in their passports, he was barred from more prestigious universities, and during his election campaign for People's Congress, antisemitic forces tried to use his status as a Jew against Zaslavskiy.

Subsequently, Zaslavskiy used – and uses – his public influence to advocate against antisemitism and for a confident Jewish identity. He regularly discusses his Jewish identity in public, most notably in a documentary film by Alexander Rodnyansky. In particular, he explicitly positions himself as a Jew on political issues within non-Jewish nations – making a stand against a typical antisemitic trope denying Jews such "interference".

Furthermore, Ilya Zaslavskiy supports the Leo Baeck Foundation and the Ernst Ludwig Ehrlich Scholarship Fund in setting up a Jewish think tank in his country of adoption, Germany.

== Trivia ==
Ilya Zaslavskiy was known in his constituency for his deliberately informal clothing style: Always without tie, never in a suit, but frequently sporting his signature chequered pullover.

Zaslavskiy holds the state civil rank of an Actual State Councillor of the Russian Federation, 3rd Class.

Zaslavskiy is currently married in his second marriage. His first wife Alevtina Nikitina, member of the Moscow City Duma, gave birth to daughter Anastasia (* 1987). With his second wife Alla Kossova, director of a Gosstroy enterprise, he had daughter Antonina (* 2003).

Zaslavskiy lives in Berlin. He is known internationally by the English transliteration of his name.
