= Yevgeni Grishkovetz =

Russian writer, dramatist, actor, and musician

- Евгений Валерьевич Гришковец
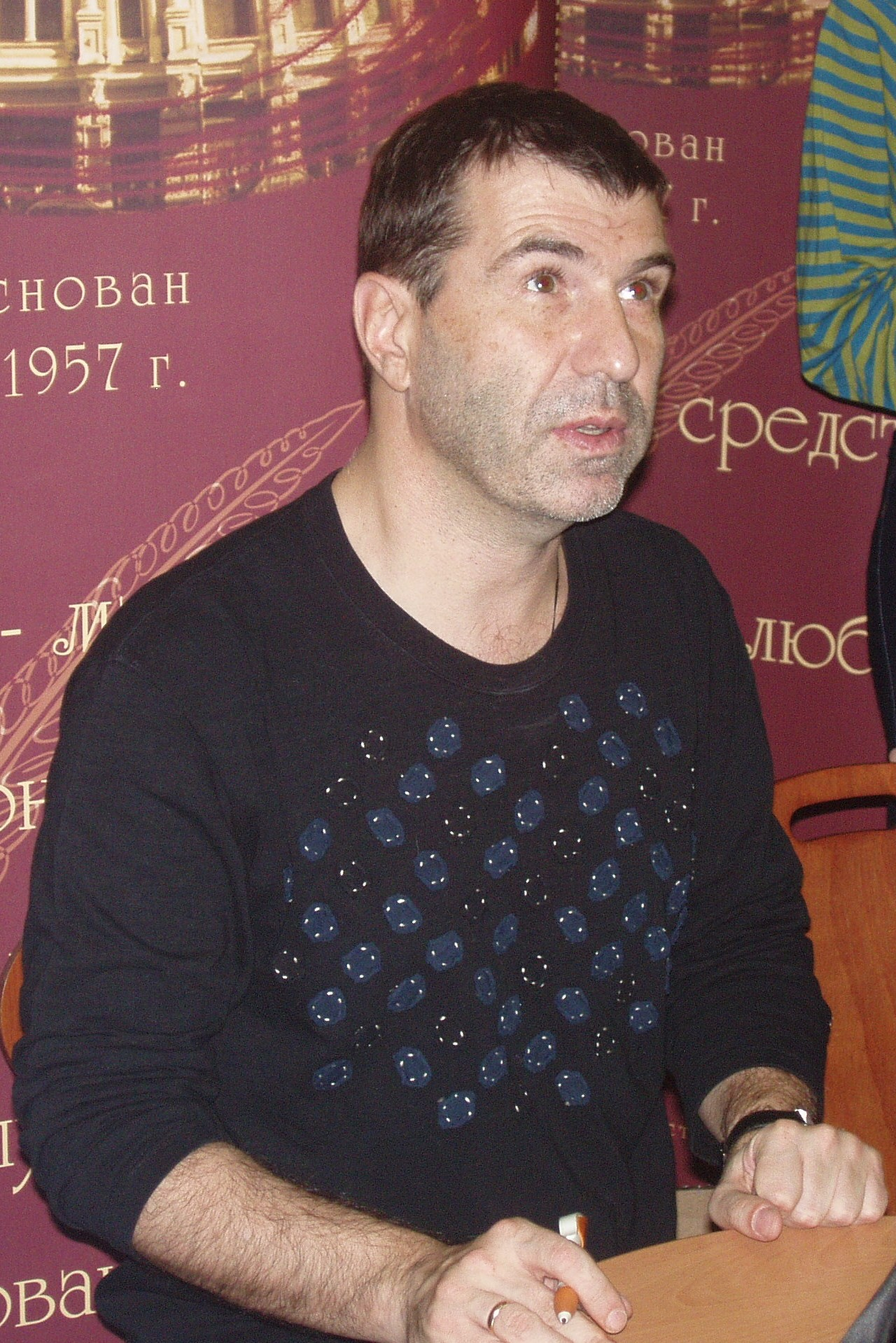
- Grishkovetz in 2008
- Born: 17 February 1967 (age 59); Kemerovo, Russian SFSR, Soviet Union
- Citizenship: Russia (since 1991); Israel (since 2023); Soviet Union (before 1991)

Yevgeni Valeryevich Grishkovetz (Russian: Евгений Валерьевич Гришковец; born 17 February 1967) is a Russian writer, dramatist, stage director, actor, and musician.

He is widely known as the author of witty solo performances. Grishkovets has staged authorial plays Odnovremenno, Planeta, Drednouty, Osada, Titanic, po Po and +1 and published a number of his books: collected plays Gorod (2001), Kak ya syel sobaku (2003), the novel Rubashka (2004), the story Reki (2005) and collected stories Planka (2006).

He has played supporting roles in remarkable Russian films including Progulka, Ne khlebom edinym and V kruge pervom.

Grishkovetz lives in Kaliningrad and tours with his theatre productions both in Russia and in Europe.

Grishkovetz is married and has three children: daughter Natalie (born 1995), son Alexander (born 2004) and daughter Maria (born 2010).

In late June 2023, he received Israeli citizenship.
