= Lippman Mayer =

German-American rabbi (1841–1904)

Lippman Mayer (August 4, 1841 – August 30, 1904) was a German-American rabbi who ministered in Pittsburgh, Pennsylvania for over 30 years.

== Life ==
Mayer was born on August 4, 1841, in Müllheim, Baden, the son of Marx Mayer and Caroline Gunzberger.

Mayer was initially educated in his hometown. Following a collegiate course in Karlsruhe he went to the University of Würzburg, where he received a M.A. and a Ph.D. During that time he also studied in the yeshiva of Rabbi Seligman Baer Bamberger. He later spent some time at the University of Berlin and received a Ph.D. from there. He then went back to Karlsruhe and taught at Dr. Plato's Seminary while continuing his rabbinic studies under Rabbi Geismar, Rabbi Schott, and Rabbi Fuerst. He worked as a rabbi in Switzerland for a year, but finding conditions in Europe unsatisfactory he resolved to go to America.

Mayer immigrated to America in around 1868 and initially served as rabbi of the French Congregation in New York City. In 1869, he became rabbi of Congregation Mishkan Israel in Selma, Alabama. In 1870, he was named rabbi of Rodef Shalom Congregation in Pittsburgh, Pennsylvania. He was with that congregation until he died. An early advocate of Reform Judaism, he was secretary of the 1869 Philadelphia Conference, one of the main figures behind the call for the 1885 Pittsburgh Conference, and a founder of the Central Conference of American Rabbis. He was active in promoting interfaith amity, especially with German churches in Pennsylvania. He helped establish the first public kindergarten in Allegheny County, and in 1880 he was a founder a Young Men's Hebrew Association in Pittsburgh.

Associated with every German-American movement in Pittsburgh, Mayer was a founder and director of the Pittsburgh Leseverein and a director of the German Home for the Aged. He served as chaplain of the Western Penitentiary from 1873 to 1883. As trustee of the Western University of Pennsylvania, he helped obtain the Reineman Maternity Hospital and the Kaufmann Clinic. In 1882, he founded a school for Russian immigrants. He was also a trustee of the Gusky Orphanage and vice-president of the United Hebrew Charities.

In 1871, Mayer married Elsie Hecht in New York City in a ceremony conducted by her relative Rabbi Samuel Adler. Their children were Mrs. Sylvia Strouse, Mrs. Dora Felsenthal, Dr. E. E. Mayer, and Rabbi Harry H. Mayer.

Mayer died in his daughter Sylvia's home in Latrobe on August 30, 1904. His funeral service was held in Rodef Shalom. Rabbi Emil G. Hirsch of the Chicago Sinai Congregation, Rabbi David Philipson of Cincinnati, Judge Josiah Cohen, Rabbi Michael Fried of the Tree of Life Congregation, and Rabbi J. Leonard Levy delivered eulogies. Rabbi Henry Berkowitz also spoke at the funeral. Members of the local Freemason lodge (which he was a member and chaplain of) were the pallbearers. The funeral cortege consisted of nearly 50 carriages. He was buried in West View Cemetery.
