= History of the Jews in Pittsburgh =

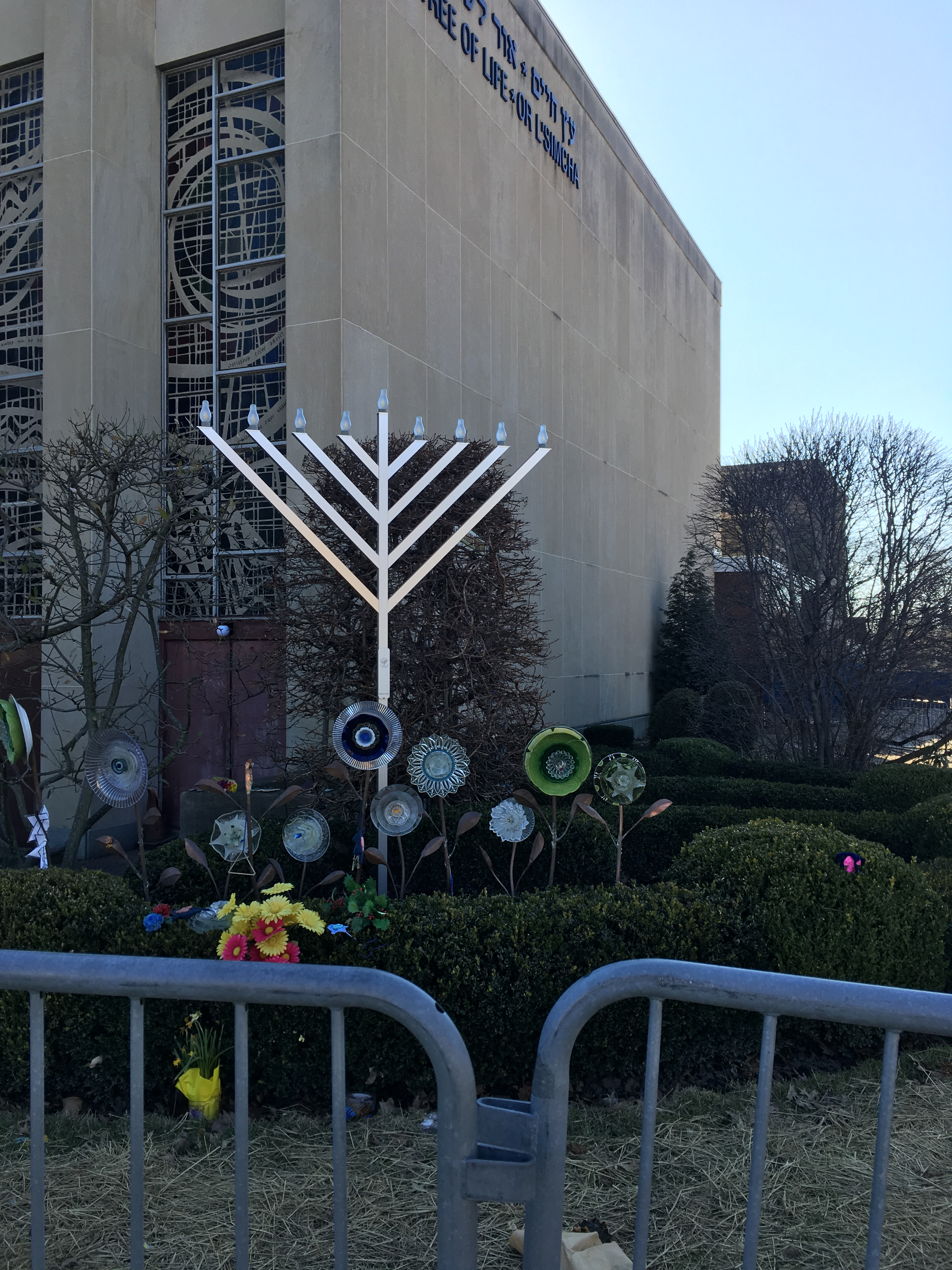
Tree of Life – Or L'Simcha Congregation

Jews have lived in and around Pittsburgh since the mid-19th century. In 2002, Jewish households represented 3.8% of households in Allegheny County, Pennsylvania. As of 2017, there were an estimated 50,000 Jews in the Greater Pittsburgh area. In 2012, Pittsburgh's Jewish community celebrated its 100th year of federated giving through the Jewish Federation of Greater Pittsburgh. The city's Jewish federation is one of the oldest in the country, marking the deep historical roots of Jews in Pittsburgh.

== Founding ==
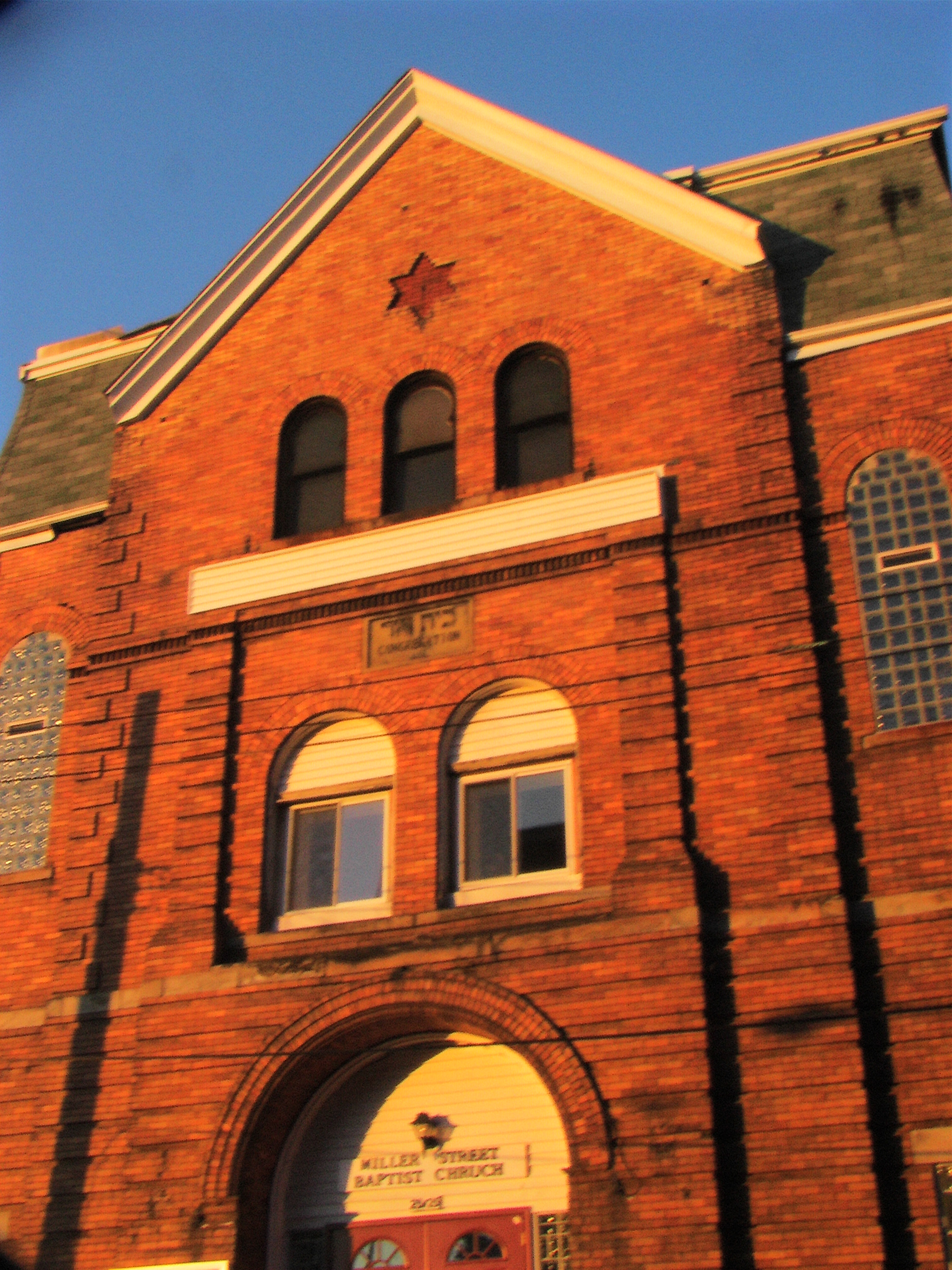
Former synagogue on Miller Street near downtown Pittsburgh, August 2007.

There are no reliable records of the beginnings of the Pittsburgh Jewish community, but it has been ascertained that between 1838 and 1844 a small number of Jews, mostly from Baden, Bavaria, and Württemberg, Germany settled in and around Pittsburgh. These communities continued to expand from 1847 until 1852. Though the first official Jewish service was held in the autumn of 1844, Jews in Pittsburgh did not officially organize until 1847, when several men worshiped in a room on Penn Street and Walnut (now 13th) Street, having engaged the Rev. Mannheimer as cantor. After this meeting, the men also formed a Bes Almon Society and purchased a cemetery at Troy Hill. This newly formed organization lacked homogeneity due to the varying religious views of its members, and divisions and reunions took place from time to time until about 1853, when a united congregation was formed under the name Rodef Shalom. In 1864 a small group of congregants dissatisfied with the movement toward Reform practices at Rodef Shalom formed a breakaway Orthodox congregation, Etz Chayyim (Tree of Life), and purchased a cemetery at Sharpsburg. By 1886, Etz Chayyim, now called Tree of Life Congregation, had affiliated itself with the Conservative movement.

In the broader American Jewish community, Pittsburgh is also famous for the 1885 "Pittsburgh Platform" which articulated bold and radical new ideas from the Reform movement on approaching theology and the modern world.

At the turn of the century, two or three synagogues were established in or on the fringe of the area which is now called the Lower Hill District. One old building near Elm Street (called the "Old Jewish Church" by some) was demolished and replaced. A group called Beth Hamedrash Hagodol-Beth Jacob Congregation meets in the new synagogue. At least one old building has survived on nearby Miller Street in the area once known colloquially as "Jews Hill", although it has since been converted into a church.

== Philanthropic associations ==
Pittsburgh is notable in American Jewish history on account of the conference (see Jew. Encyc. iv. 215, s.v. Conferences, Rabbinical) held there in 1885, and is also well-known as a generous supporter of national Jewish movements, notably the Hebrew Union College and the Denver Hospital. Among the more prominent local philanthropic and charitable institutions may be mentioned the following:

- J. M. Gusky Orphanage and Home, with the Bertha Rauh Cohen Annex. The Home was founded in 1890 by Esther Gusky, in memory of her husband, Jacob Mark Gusky. The Annex was the gift in 1889 of Aaron Cohen in memory of his wife, Bertha Rauh Cohen, the only daughter of Rosalia Rauh and the late Solomon Rauh. The Home had 62 inmates, an annual income of about $10,000, and an endowment fund of $67,000. It closed in 1943.
- The United Hebrew Relief Association, a union of the Hebrew Benevolent Society and the Hebrew Ladies' Aid Society. It paid for the care of the sick and for funerals as well as purchasing coal for families. It dispensed $10,000 yearly, and had a sinking-fund of $29,000.
- The Columbian Council School, also known as the Irene Kaufmann Settlement, a social settlement. It conducted a large number of classes and public lectures and contained a library, public baths, and gymnasium. The bath-house was the gift of Alexander Peacock. The disbursements were about $6,000 annually.
- The Hebrew Ladies' Hospital Aid Society secured and paid for hospital attention for the sick poor. It had an annual income of about $8,000, and funded the construction of the Montefiore Hospital. The organization continues to exist as the Ladies Hospital Aid Society, helping the community of western Pennsylvania.
- The Young Ladies' Sewing Society, which dispensed clothing to the poor; its income was about $2,000 annually.
- The Concordia Club, now known as the O'Hara Student Center, fostered Jewish social life in Pittsburgh from its opening in 1874 until it closed in 2009.
- The Council of Jewish Women continues to help families, women, and children since its founding in 1893.

== Newspapers ==
There were two weekly newspapers for the Jewish community. The Jewish Criterion, in English, was published from 1895 to 1962, of which Rabbi Levy and Charles H. Joseph were the editors. Another newspaper was in Yiddish and Hebrew, known as Der Volksfreund from its founding in 1889 and later renamed to Der Idisher Folksfreynd, which was in circulation from 1922 to 1924.

Since 1962, the Pittsburgh Jewish Chronicle is published weekly for the Jewish community of the Greater Pittsburgh Region.

== Prominent Jews ==
Donors to non-sectarian charities included J.D. Bernd and Isaac Kaufmann, the latter of whom in 1895 gave the Emma Kaufmann Free Clinic to the medical department of the University of Pittsburgh. Among those who held positions in public life are Emanuel Wertheimer, select councilman and member of the state House of Representatives; Morris Einstein, select councilman (15 years); Josiah Cohen, judge of the Orphans' Court; E.E. Mayer, city physician; L.S. Levin, assistant city attorney. Isaac W. Frank was president of the National Founders' Association, and A. Leo Weil was a member of the executive committee of the Voters' Civic League.

There was a steady increase since 1882 in the number of Jewish people in Pittsburgh, the new settlers coming mostly from eastern Europe. Russian, Romanian, and Hungarian Jews came in large numbers and began to display an appreciable interest in public affairs. They had six synagogues in 1906 (whose rabbis included Aaron M. Ashinsky and M.S. Sivitz), many ḥebras, and a number of small religious societies. The Pittsburgh Jewry strongly sympathized with the Zionist movement, having a large number of Zionist societies. The number of Jewish inhabitants in 1906 was estimated at between 15,000 and 25,000, in a total population of about 322,000.

Some notable Jews from Pittsburgh include rapper and record producer Mac Miller, entrepreneur and television personality Mark Cuban, and actor and musician Jeff Goldblum.

== Squirrel Hill ==
Pittsburgh's Squirrel Hill neighborhood is considered to be the city's primary Jewish hub. Nearly half of the population of Squirrel Hill is Jewish. Squirrel Hill has had a large Jewish population since the 1920s, when Jewish people began to move to the neighborhood in large numbers from the Oakland and Hill District neighborhoods of Pittsburgh. According to a 2002 study by the United Jewish Federation, 33% of the Pittsburgh Jewish population lived in Squirrel Hill and another 14% in the surrounding area. Squirrel Hill currently contains three Jewish day schools, catering to the Lubavich, Orthodox, and Conservative movements. There are over twenty synagogues. This Jewish community also offers four restaurants, a Jewish community center, and an annual festival.

== Synagogue shooting ==
On October 27, 2018, a right-wing extremist attacked Tree of Life – Or L'Simcha Congregation (Note: Hebrew: עֵץ חַיִּים – אוֹר לְשִׂמְחָה) synagogue in Squirrel Hill. The congregation, along with New Light Congregation and Congregation Dor Hadash, which also worshipped in the building, was attacked during Shabbat morning services on October 27, 2018. The perpetrator killed eleven people and wounded six, including several Holocaust survivors. The shooting was the deadliest attack on a local Jewish community in American history.

The perpetrator, identified as 46-year-old Robert Gregory Bowers, was shot multiple times by police and arrested at the scene. Bowers had earlier posted antisemitic comments against HIAS (formerly, Hebrew Immigrant Aid Society) on the online alt-tech social network Gab. Dor Hadash had participated in HIAS's National Refugee Shabbat the previous week. Referring to Central American migrant caravans and immigrants, Bowers posted a message on Gab in which he wrote that "HIAS likes to bring invaders in that kill our people. I can't sit by and watch my people get slaughtered. Screw your optics, I'm going in." He was charged with 63 federal crimes, some of which are capital crimes. He pleaded not guilty. On June 16, 2023, he was found guilty on all federal counts, and on August 3, 2023, he was sentenced to death by lethal injection.

== Gaza war ==
The community was divided by the 2023 Gaza war, with some backing Israel and others calling for a ceasefire. In 2024 two people (one of them Jewish) were arrested for spray-painting pro-Palestinian graffiti on a Chabad synagogue and the offices of the Jewish Federation of Greater Pittsburgh.

== See also ==
- American Jewish Museum
- Culture of Pittsburgh
- History of Pittsburgh
- History of the Jews in Pennsylvania
- Pittsburgh (Hasidic dynasty)

== Bibliography ==
- History of Congregation Rodeph Shalom, 1899
- articles in the Jewish Criterion, 1901
- American Israelite, 1893
