= Jewish Criterion =

The Jewish Criterion (OCLC 2262915), whose editors included J. Leonard Levy (rabbi of Rodef Shalom) and Charles H. Joseph, was one of two weekly papers for Jews in Pittsburgh. It was published 1895-1962, with the initial editor being M. K. Susman. WorldCat annotates it as the "Oldest English printed Jewish weekly representing Western Pennsylvania, Eastern Ohio and West Virginia Jewry"

A 1914 advertisement from the paper was used to substantiate the etymology of the word "pastrami." The Oxford English Dictionary quotes:

Sardines and pimentos‥.Pastrami‥. Rye bread [etc.]

In 1962, the newspaper was replaced by the Pittsburgh Jewish Chronicle.
