= James N. Rosenberg =

American painter

- James N. Rosenberg as a young man
- Born: James Naumburg Rosenberg; November 20, 1874; Allegheny City, Pennsylvania
- Died: July 21, 1970 (aged 95); White Plains, New York

James N. Rosenberg (1874–1970) was an American lawyer, artist, humanitarian, and writer. In law, he is remembered for his handling of the collapsed business empire of the so-called "Swedish Match King," Ivar Kreuger. In art, he is remembered for two types of pictures, on the one hand, realist landscapes of the Adirondack Mountains in which critics saw a strong feeling for nature and a refined rather than exuberant sensibility, and on the other, dramatic scenes that, as one critic said, "recall the Wall Street crash of 1929, the triumph of 'Ironism' in his native Pittsburgh and the potential terror of 'atomism' in the nuclear age." As a humanist, he worked to protect freedom of speech, end the persecution of minority communities, aid refugees, and mitigate conflict among nations. In this work, he is remembered for leading a group of civic, religious, labor, racial, and business leaders whose single goal was the passage and subsequent ratification of the United Nations Genocide Convention.

== Early life and training ==
Rosenberg was born in Allegheny City, Pennsylvania on November 20, 1874. In 1879, his family moved to a building on the Upper West Side in Manhattan. As a child, he attended nearby Ethical Culture School and later became a boarding student at Gunnery Preparatory School in rural Connecticut. Both were known for liberal educational policies. He received his undergraduate education at Columbia College and upon graduating in 1895 entered Columbia Law School from which he obtained an LL.B. degree in 1898. During the summer of 1912, he attended a session of an art school in Woodstock, New York, but, as explained below, left after only two or three weeks.

== Career in law ==
Rosenberg partnered with other Columbia Law graduates in a career that spanned nearly half a century. His specialty was the law of bankruptcy. After receiving his L.L.B. degree in 1898, Rosenberg joined the New York Bar. In 1900 he formed a law partnership with Joseph Proskauer, an attorney who had received his Bachelor of Arts degree from Columbia College in 1896 and his law degree from Columbia Law in 1899. (Note: As Columbia undergraduates, Rosenberg and Proskauer had become friends. In 1897 they collected and published a book of student poetry called Columbia Verse, 1892-1897. Proskauer (1877–1971) married Rosenberg's cousin, Alice Naumburg, in 1903.) In the new practice Rosenberg specialized in bankruptcy law. During the years Rosenberg was studying law at Columbia, the United States Congress debated and finally, in 1898, passed a new law, the Bankruptcy Act of 1898, to regulate the dealings of insolvent businesses and their creditors. The law gave federal courts jurisdiction to oversee bankruptcy proceedings and it established a new court-appointed law officer, the referee in bankruptcy to act as the court's agent. (Note: Under the Bankruptcy Act of 1898 courts were empowered, when requested by creditors, to appoint receivers "to take charge of the property of bankrupts after the filing of the petition and until it is dismissed or the trustee is qualified." (Under certain circumstances, a trustee could be appointed by creditors to assume the responsibilities of the receiver.) Referees were lawyers empowered to adjudicate cases in place of judges.) One of Rosenberg's earliest court appointments occurred in September 1900, when the New York Supreme Court appointed him receiver in a claim made by a brewing company against a sign painting firm. In June 1901, he was appointed referee in a claim against a life assurance society.

A few years later both Rosenberg and Proskauer joined the firm of James, Schell & Elkus. Although the firm continued to use the old name, both James (Edward C. James, 1841-1901) and Schell (Edward Paul Schell, 1836-1901) had by that time died. The firm's remaining partner, Abram Isaac Elkus, had graduated from Columbia Law School in 1888. In 1903 James, Schell & Elkus was named permanent counsel for a merchants' association that pooled its resources in order to take legal action against bankrupts who attempted to defraud their creditors. (Note: Formed in 1899, the group was called the Merchants' Protective Association. It employed accountants and lawyers to investigate bankrupts and assure fraudulent transactions had not been made. One member called its targets "rascally failures." When incorporated in 1903 its members were the largest dry goods businesses in the city. A news account said the members "pledged to seek no advantage over the other," and added, "Dishonest debtors are to be rigorously prosecuted and honest men aided to a reasonable settlement and a fresh start.") In that year Rosenberg was attorney for the creditors in the bankruptcy of a company that manufactured boilers and other steam appliances. His investigation showed that before the bankruptcy had been declared the president had taken a large sum of money out of the business for his personal use.

In 1912 Rosenberg and another lawyer left James, Schell & Elkus to form a partnership called Rosenberg and Levis. In announcing the new firm the two men said they would be taking over the Elkus bankruptcy department and would continue as attorneys for the merchants' association. Rosenberg's partner, Robert P. Levis (1878–1943) was a lawyer in the Elkus firm who had graduated from Columbia Law School in 1903. He was, like Rosenberg, a bankruptcy specialist who received court appointments to act as receiver of bankrupts' assets.

At this time, Rosenberg was named counsel for the receivers in a bankruptcy that was, as he later said, the biggest and best of his young career. The United States Motor Company was a large conglomerate of automobile manufacturers. It was deeply in debt and at the end of 1912 became insolvent. Early in 1913, the Maxwell Motor Company survived the breakup of the conglomerate (and would later evolve into the Chrysler Corporation). At this time, the head of the reorganization committee asked Rosenberg to replace Maxwell's retiring president, Benjamin Briscoe, move to Detroit, and manage the company. Rosenberg later said he rejected this "tempting proposal to become an industrial leader" from his conviction "that to accept would have meant farewell to the kind of life I wanted to lead."

The following year Rosenberg and Levis accepted Wilbur L. Ball as a partner. Wilbur Laing Ball (1874–1941), then a bankruptcy lawyer and later an insurance specialist, had been a classmate of Rosenberg's in Columbia Law School (LL.B. 1898). Rosenberg remained with Ball after Levis departed in 1917. Not long after this realignment, Rosenberg was named receiver in a stock market scandal. In 1920 a group of influential investors hired Rosenberg to counter an attempt by the head of the Stutz Motor Company to manipulate the price of the company's shares. The investors had all been short-selling Stutz, that is to say they placed bets that the share price would fall by borrowing large blocks of stock for which they promised to pay at a future date. Their gain on the short sale would be the difference between the price of shares when borrowed and the price when the borrowing period ended (and the shares were sold). After the company's president, Allan A. Ryan, used his control over the remaining (non-shorted) shares to drive the price up, the short-sellers were expected to pay a great deal more than they had hoped. Ryan's control over the remaining shares and consequent ability to manipulate their price was called a corner and thus this incident came to be known as the "Stutz Corner." The event was later called "one of the most sensational operations in market history." Rosenberg helped to engineer a settlement between Ryan and the group of investors through mediation by a committee of bankers (all of whom were to be "men of prominence and standing in the community, who would have the confidence of all parties").

In 1925, the partnership, now known as Rosenberg, Ball & Marvin, was said to be "the firm which did the largest corporation reorganization work in the United States." The new partner was William Glenn Marvin (1892–1932) who had previously headed the legal department at National City Bank. A few years later, Ball and Marvin having left the firm, Rosenberg partnered with Godfrey Goldmark (1881–1968) and Ralph F. Colin (1901–1985) to form a firm that continued to operate from 1930 until Rosenberg's retirement in 1947. Goldmark had previously been corporation counsel for the New York Transit Commission and Colin was hired into the firm after graduating from Columbia Law in 1921.

Late in his career, Rosenberg said his favorite case was the collapse of the empire of Ivar Kreuger, the so-called "Swedish Match King." Exercising what one reporter called a "mysterious fascination" over bankers in the United States and Europe, Kreuger was able to build a small Swedish sign-painting business into a global conglomerate of 150 manufacturing plants with more than 60,000 employees that was said to produce 75% of the world's matches. When this empire crashed in 1932, a New York bank, the Irving Trust Company, was named receiver and trustee for the bankrupt firm and it retained Rosenberg, Goldmark & Colin as its attorneys. Over the course of the next 13 years, Rosenberg and his colleagues unraveled the complex affairs of the conglomerate while overseeing the management of the business that it operated. They discovered that the majority of assets listed in company books were fictitious and that Kreuger himself had stolen or squandered the most valuable assets prior to the collapse. Creditors made claims for more than one billion dollars of which about one-tenth was eventually allowed. One investigator provided this summary of Rosenberg's actions in the case: "The trustee's representatives, notably the law firm of Rosenberg, Goldmark & Colin, found themselves operating for several years a match business that extended from Norway to Turkey and from Spain to Syria and reached all the way out to the Philippines. The theory held and gradually put into practice by James N. Rosenberg, the senior counsel, however, was that there was no sound basis for Kreuger's match concessions once the depression started and the economic apple cart was everywhere upset. Rosenberg insisted on liquidating the foreign companies as quickly as possible and also disposing of foreign government bonds, and his approach was vindicated in the light of wartime disruption and post-war political developments." The bankruptcy case was closed in November 1945 after $98,000,000 had been paid out to creditors.

At Rosenberg's retirement in 1947, the firm, then called Rosenberg, Goldmark, Colin, & Kaye, was succeeded by Rosenman, Goldmark, Colin & Kaye. (Sydney M. Kaye (1900–1979) was an authority on copyright law and specialist in broadcast communications. Samuel Rosenman was a prominent New Deal Democrat and Columbia-trained lawyer. In 2002, following a number of other transitions, the firm of Katten Muchin Rosenman became successor to Rosenman, Goldmark, Colin & Kaye.)

== Humanitarian ==
The desire to see decent, just treatment meted out among men is the highest attitude of civilized man. It is a greater thing than the love for beauty or the love between men and women.

Rosenberg began working to benefit humanity while he was still an undergraduate. During those years he participated in amateur theatricals and in 1895 was a member of a group called the Don Quixote Club which gave a benefit show for New York's Hebrew Charities. (Note: In 1874 the heads of New York's Jewish relief organizations formed United Hebrew Charities to centralize the coordination of their activities. P.W. Frank was its first president. In 1926 the group changed its name to the Jewish Social Service Association and it is now known as the Jewish Board of Family and Children's Services.) In 1909 he was elected to the Hebrew Charities board of directors and continued in that role for the next decade. By 1921 he had been elected vice president of the Hebrew Charities' Desertion Bureau, an organization founded in 1905 that helped Jewish immigrant women whose husbands had deserted them.

At the age of 46, he had achieved much success in the legal profession and some recognition as professional artist and playwright. Nonetheless, at the request of the banker, Felix M. Warburg, he became a member of the Joint Distribution Committee, of which Warburg was a principal leader, and, as its European director, took charge of efforts to help the hundreds of thousands of Jews who had become destitute during the Russian Revolution and its aftermath. Rosenberg agreed to devote a year of full-time work on the project and to contribute as much time as he could after returning to his normal life. At first, Rosenberg coordinated with the American Relief Administration, headed by Herbert Hoover, and later directed a separate organization, the American Jewish Joint Agricultural Corporation, known as Agro-Joint. By means of this organization and a subsidiary called the American Society for Jewish Farm Settlements in Russia, Rosenberg worked within the Soviet political system to help direct $8,000,000 of donated aid in order to resettle some 300,000 displaced Jews from Russian ghettos into farms, mainly in the Crimea. During a decade and a half the operation was a qualified success. Many many urban dwellers were able to transition to factory farming but others were at best reluctant to adopt the new way of life; the Soviet government gave both funds and cooperation, but was unwilling to cede necessary authority to the project. Agro-Joint ended tragically after the Soviets withdrew support in 1939 and the subsequent Nazi invasion resulted in the eastward displacement of most settlers and the extermination of the rest.

During the 1920s, 1930s, and 1940s, Rosenberg was an energetic fundraiser for charitable causes. He was elected vice-chairman of the Joint Distribution Committee, headed fundraising drives in New York City, and took the lead in the city's fundraising for the Allied Jewish Campaign. In the early 1930s he became alarmed at the rise of Nazism. He participated in the JDC's German Relief Campaign and, calling the treatment of Jews an "unspeakable catastrophe," urged influential German Jews to take antisemitic outrages seriously. On reading horrible antisemitic slanders in German newspapers he approached Jewish leaders in Berlin asking them to do everything they could to stop "the spreading of such poison." Writing in 1935, he said, "A few of them assured me that such efforts were being attempted. But for the most part, the thing was looked on as a passing phase which would fall of its own weight." In 1939 he helped found an umbrella organization via the merger of the Joint Distribution Committee with two other philanthropic groups. Called, United Jewish Appeal, its immediate objective was support of Jews who escaped Germany and Nazi-held territories. In 1940, after the United States and other industrialized democracies refused to admit more than small numbers of Jewish refugees, Rosenberg led a program to resettle Jews in the one country that declared it would welcome large numbers of them. This was the Dominican Republic, then ruled by a vicious dictator, Rafael Trujillo, and the program, called the Sosua Settlement, was a direct descendant of the Crimean settlement effort. The Nazi regime was at first amenable to Jewish emigration, but war conditions quickly made mass action impossible as travel through Europe and across the Atlantic became increasingly perilous. In the end, relatively few settlers made the journey and, as in the Crimea, some of them were reluctant to take up farming.

He maintained his connection with the Joint Distribution Committee throughout the 1920s and 1930s. During that time he was named Chairman of the National Council, Chairman of the Executive Committee, and Chairman of the Board of Directors. In 1946 he was named its Honorary Chairman.

Rosenberg also supported resettlement of refugees in Palestine. In 1929, he was one of the non-Zionist founders of the Jewish Agency for Palestine and was a director and co-founder of the Palestine Economic Development Corporation. During 1950, he traveled in Israel, meeting with Israeli leaders and the U.S. ambassador as part of an effort to increase Americans' private investment in the country.

In 1937, Rosenberg had become a director of a newly formed group called the Better Understanding Foundation, a national organization of Christians and Jews that worked to promote understanding among people of different races and creeds. At the end of World War II, he resumed this aspect of his philanthropic work as a member of the National Conference of Christians and Jews. As chair of the conference's Committee on Human Rights, he pushed for adoption of an international bill of rights as essential to establishing a just and lasting peace at the close of World War II. In 1946 he became a vocal advocate of for the Genocide Convention being debated by the newly-formed United Nations. In 1948, he was elected chair of the newly-formed United States Committee for a United Nations Genocide Convention, a group formed to urge U.N. passage of the convention and, in 1950, he led the group in urging the U.S. Senate to ratify it. Composed of leaders from more than 45 civic, religious, labor, racial, business, and legal groups, the committee helped to achieve support for ratifying the convention from President Truman and key members of his administration. However, the elections of 1950 brought about a change in the composition of the U.S. Senate that made ratification impossible. At the time, Rosenberg ascribed the change to a resurgence of isolationism in the United States.

In 1925, Rosenberg had published a law review article on the League of Nations World Court in which he advocated compulsory jurisdiction enforceable by moral suasion and public opinion but not force of arms. By this rule, states would agree to accept the court's jurisdiction but could not be forcibly compelled to abide by its judgments. The League of Nations did not adopt this rule. In 1965, Rosenberg made the same argument with respect to the United Nations World Court. The United Nations charter allowed for member states to accept that court's compulsory jurisdiction and many of them have done so. (Note: These include the 27 member states of the Council of Europe as well as Australia, Canada, Japan, Mexico, and New Zealand.) Rosenberg argued that the United States Senate should abandon its long-standing refusal to join this group of nations. Although Rosenberg had joined Grenville Clark in founding an organization that was devoted to the cause of world peace through law, he did not share Clark's passion for giving the United Nations power to enforce judicial decisions through force of arms. Deeming that impractical and undesirable, he said that while the policy he proposed would not be able to ensure compliance in all circumstances, it would probably do so in the great majority of them.

== Artist ==
James N. Rosenberg, Adirondack Cloudburst, 1946, oil on canvas, 25 x 31 inches

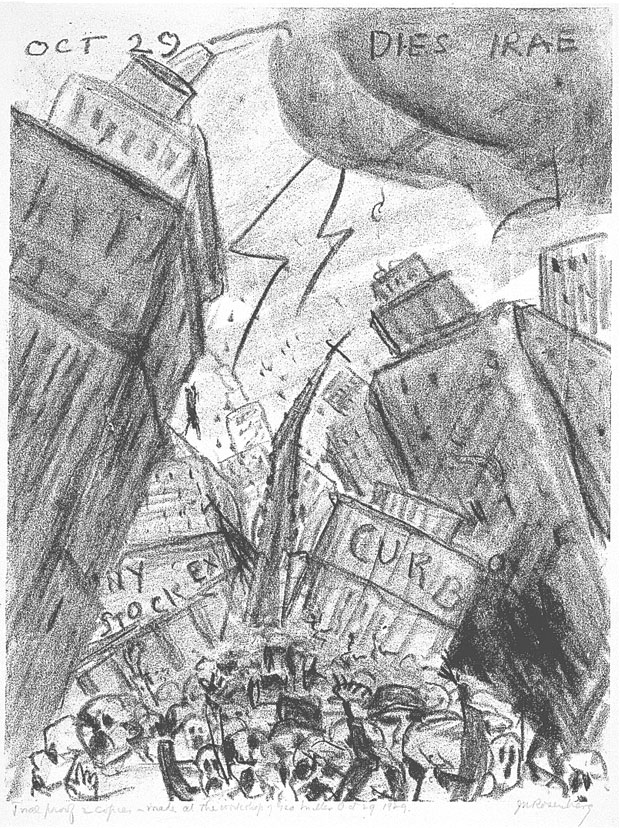
James N. Rosenberg depicting Black Tuesday 13 3/4 x 10 1/2 inches

James N. Rosenberg, Spring Valley 1943, watercolor on paper, 14 1/2 x 21 inches

James N. Rosenberg, Pastel Trees, 1967, pastel on paper, 29 x 32 1/2 inches

James N. Rosenberg, New York in Snow, 1946, oil on canvas, 29 3/4 x 30 1/8 inches

Rosenberg started to draw when still a child and began painting as a hobby when he was in his thirties. In 1910, he signed up for a summer session of art study in Woodstock, New York, but left after two or three weeks when it became obvious to him that the students were all trying to copy the instructor. He later said he preferred being Rosenberg to being a parrot. In 1911, he told an interviewer that he made sketches when he traveled, both on his daily commute from Far Rockaway to Manhattan and back and on his trips for vacations or business meetings. In 1921, he told another interviewer that although he was a professional artist, he did not exhibit in commercial galleries for the money he could earn from sales but rather "for the fun of it," and in 1928 he added, "I certainly want people to buy [my paintings]."

In 1911, he achieved a feat that was out of reach for most beginning artists when Louis Katz gave him a solo exhibition at his eponymous commercial art gallery on West 74th Street in Manhattan. (Note: Established in 1894, the Louis Katz galleries specialized in realist work by American artists, including such prominent men as John F. Carlson, John Marin, Gifford Beal, Clark Voorhees, Charles Webster Hawthorne, and Childe Hassam. The galleries closed in 1916.) An equally unlikely outcome was a long and appreciative review of this exhibition in the Brooklyn Daily Eagle. Crediting Rosenberg with a "poetic sense," the paper's critic said the 40 pastels in the show were "sensitive and quietly impressive rather than bold and big in style, color," and added, "the subtle handling of themes are important points in the work." This critic went on to give favorable appraisals of many works by name, writing, for example, that "'Jamaica Bay, Emerald and Mauve,' shows a remarkable scenic effect, with its green-shot water and mauve areas. There are some evening effects with lights of big hotels along the shore, piercing the remembrance of sunset in the sky." A critic for the New York Times was also impressed by the show, saying the pastels were "refined in color and show[ed] a vision sensitive to beauty." Of two of them, this critic wrote, "'Wet Street,' is a poetic transcription of a scene many times noted by the artists of the city, and 'Steam and Mist' is another successful version of the mysterious and exquisite effects with which New York clothes her medley of architecture." In 1913, Rosenberg received a second solo exhibition of pastels, this time at the Arlington Art Galleries in Brooklyn, and, once again, the works displayed received favorable critical notice. (Note: Located in Brooklyn, the Arlington Art Galleries, like the Katz Galleries, specialized in works by realists (in this case European as well as American artists) and men of an earlier generation as well as contemporary ones.) One critic praised a "refinement and practiced hand" and another said the pictures had "refined color and much feeling for nature." A third critic was almost effusive, writing, "Many men aim at poetry through the medium of pictorial art, but it is not often they achieve the lyric bays so truly as this painter has done in this little group of pastels." (Note: The phrase "lyric bays" refers to the laurel wreaths that were figuratively bestowed on poets.) In 1916, he contributed a painting to the annual exhibition of the New York Water Color Club. In 1917, he exhibited in the first group exhibition held by the Society of Independent Artists. The following year he showed pastels at the Anderson Galleries with all proceeds from sales to be donated to the Red Cross. (Note: The Anderson Galleries were founded in 1903 by John Anderson. In 1929 it merged with the galleries of the American Art Association. In addition to art sales, the galleries sold fine editions and operated as an auction house.) The show included landscapes and still lifes. A critic for the New York Tribune praised one of the former, "Scattering Clouds," as a "strong piece of work" revealing "deep blue mountains" against an "exquisite turquoise sky." In 1921, he showed with Marsden Hartley at the Anderson Galleries. The following year Rosenberg helped found a gallery called The New Gallery (and was called one of the gallery's "leading spirits and godfather"). The gallery was financed in part by an innovative scheme, the New Gallery Club, begun in February 1923. The club supported the gallery through its membership fees and it raised funds and publicized exhibitions by means of entertainments, teas, and receptions. Many club members were amateur artists whose work the gallery showed in special exhibitions. In 1924, Rosenberg showed three paintings in a group exhibition at the gallery. Four years later, he held a solo exhibition of Adirondack Mountain landscapes at the Erich Galleries. (Note: Louis R. Erich opened the Erich Galleries in 1910. Over the next few decades he specialized in showing paintings by American and European masters including John Singleton Copley, Jean-Auguste-Dominique Ingres, Jacques-Louis David, Charles Le Brun, Jacob van Loo, and Jean-Baptiste-Siméon Chardin.) At that time he told an interviewer that he painted simply for the joy of it. He said, "I have no suppressed longing to live in the South Seas and do nothing but paint. And I have no 'message' to give the world. I happen to be very fond of the Adirondacks, and my summer home is located among them." His painting, "Adirondack Cloudburst," of 1946 (shown at right) is one of many mountain landscapes he made in the course of his career. In 1928, he contributed two paintings to a group exhibition of the Salons of America at the Anderson Galleries. (Note: Hamilton Easter Field wholly endorsed the "no prizes, no juries" policy of the Society of Independent Artists but, believing the society favored some of its artists over others, started the Salons of America to assure that every member would have equal opportunity to be seen by the public. To this end, its exhibitions were hung in alphabetical order by artist surname. The group held annual exhibitions at New York's Anderson Galleries.) In 1929, Rosenberg departed from the style of painting and subject matter of his earlier work when he produced what turned out to be his best-known piece, a lithograph called "Dies Irae" (Day of Wrath), showing the October 29, 1929, Wall Street Crash as a horrific scene of destruction. On January 12, 1930, the New York Times put a reproduction of the lithograph on the front page of its Sunday magazine. "Dies Irae" is shown at left.

Later that year, he was given a solo exhibition of Adirondack Landscapes at the 56th Street Galleries in Manhattan. (Note: Founded in 1929, Fifty-Sixth Street Galleries showed a mix of paintings by old and modern masters along with European and American sculpture. Riccardo Bertelli and Edward Cournand were the directors.) In 1943, 15 years after a Red Cross benefit in the First World War, Rosenberg showed watercolors and pastels at the Ferargil Gallery with proceeds from sales once again to benefit the American Red Cross. (Note: By contributing gallery space and preparing a catalog for the exhibition free of charge, the galleries' director, Frederic Newlin Price, joined with Rosenberg in contributing to the cause. Price (1883-1963) founded the Ferargil Galleries in 1915 and directed them into the 1950s. He preferred realist work for most of his career and received notice for being among the first to exhibit Thomas Eakins, Grant Wood, and Thomas Hart Benton.) Reviewing the show in the Brooklyn Daily Eagle, the critic, A.Z. Kruse said, "Mr. Rosenberg holds his own admirably, even in this hectic week filled with proficient exhibitions." He wrote that the paintings showed "creative realism" and a "basic charm" and praised the show's watercolors as among the best then being produced. (Note: A.Z. (Alexander) Kruse (1888-1972) was an American artist who studied with John Sloan and Robert Henri and who specialized in social realist paintings. He wrote art criticism for the Brooklyn Daily Eagle and wrote self-instruction articles and books, including How to Draw and Paint ( New York, Barnes & Noble, 1953).) "Spring Valley," shown at right, illustrates his watercolor technique at this time. Rosenberg showed at Ferargil again the following year. The show featured paintings that differed greatly from his usual serene landscapes. Some depicted what a critic called the "smoke and flame" of Pittsburgh's steel mills and others the horrors of war and oppression. At that time a feature writer for the New York Post interviewed him for a lengthy profile in which he admitted that while he painted for the pleasure of it, the impetus for these paintings came from a necessity to express his feelings about the state of the world in the midst of the Second World War.

When Rosenberg retired from his law practice in 1947, he began a practice of donating works from his collection and proceeds from exhibition sales to charitable causes. In that year, he was given a solo exhibition at the Wildenstein Galleries. Howard Devree, a critic for the New York Times, who had briefly criticized Rosenberg's 1943 exhibition as "earnest" but "not very impressive," gave this show a long and quite favorable review. He noted that some of the paintings had been loaned by private collectors and others by prominent museums, including the Boston Museum of Fine Arts, and that W. G. Constable of the Boston Museum had written the foreword to the accompanying catalog. Devree said "Mr. Rosenberg's painting is never pretentious or sensational. The play of light, the fleeting mood of a landscape, always such challenges to the artist, he strives to capture simply—not by literal transcription but with a warmly understanding interpretation." On passing the age of 80 in 1954 he continued to paint and exhibit, including a show of work made during the trip he made to Israel to meet with Ben Gurion and others. Regarding one of these shows, a New York Times critic, Stuart Preston, praised the emotional power of his mountain landscapes and his landscapes showing the devastation that he imagined would result from atomic war, but he was less enthusiastic about their artistic value. (Note: Stuart Preston (1915-2005) was an art reporter and critic on the staff of the New York Times from 1949 to 1965. He had also been a curator for the National Gallery of Art and, during World War II, served on the Arts and Monuments Commission.) He wrote, "The very humanity of Rosenberg's feelings goes far to excuse the esthetic shortcomings of the paintings."

When Rosenberg was 85, in 1959, he showed 40 of his paintings in Baltimore. The show coincided with the publication of a memoir, A Painter's Self-Portrait (New York, Crown Publishers, 1958). The conjunction of the show, the publication, and his birthday was the impetus for a lengthy profile of his career in art that appeared in the Baltimore Sun in which the interviewer said Rosenberg's age was deceptive. Rosenberg, he said, was "timeless." A few years later, when he turned 87, he was again interviewed, this time during a benefit exhibition of oils and pastels given in honor of a spiritual mentor and friend, the Rabbi, Jonah Wise. The interviewer, John W. Stevens of the New York Times, summarized both Rosenberg's charitable intentions and the contrasting visions reflected in his art: "Although hundreds of paintings he has given to hospitals and to the State Department for display abroad reflect 'peace, joy and beauty,' Mr. Rosenberg has not turned his back on tragedy. In colleges and universities, in the homes of friends and art collectors, and in art centers on three continents, his paintings and lithographs dramatically recall the Wall Street crash of 1929, the triumph of 'Ironism' in his native Pittsburgh, and the potential terror of 'atomism' in the nuclear age." "Pastel Trees," shown at left, is an example of his pastel technique at this time. In 1964, on his 90th birthday, when Rosenberg prepared an exhibition benefiting the Westchester Art Society, he was again accorded an extensive interview. In it, he said he had never sold a painting for more than $1,000 but had given away thousands until he had denuded his home. A year later, presented President Johnson with a large montage to celebrate passage of the Voting Rights Act of 1965. Labeled "Birth of the Great Society," it contained clippings from newspapers and magazines and photos that Lady Bird Johnson had sent him.

=== Artistic style and critical reception ===
My landscapes have been and are magic carpets on which I have flown from a world embittered by fear, hate and greed to regions of peace, joy and beauty.

Rosenberg's art is representational. Called a "romantic realist," he adopted Paul Cézanne as his model and explicitly rejected the New York art world's shift toward abstraction in the late 1940s. In a 1959 interview he acknowledged that his style was no longer fashionable and said he was content to serve the needs of his art in his own way. More than that, he disdained the "contemporary avalanches of abstract paintings" and said abstract artists had "nothing new to communicate." He made pastels and oils throughout his career. Beginning in the 1920s he made lithographs and late in his career he made at least one montage. He made landscapes, particularly of scenes from the Adirondack Mountains, where he owned extensive property, but also of scenes from places where he traveled on vacation or business. These paintings were said to show a strong feeling for the natural environment and were seen as refined rather than exuberant. He made cityscapes. One example of the latter is an oil called "New York in Snow," shown at right. And he chose current events as his subjects. These include celebrations, such as an early pastel, "Victory Parade—Return of the 27th Division, AEF, 1919" and a late pastel, "March Parade of Colonel John B. Glenn (New York City, March 1, 1962)," but they also include the prints he made showing tragic events, both real (such as the 1929 stock market crash) and imaginary such as the devastation that would be caused by atomic warfare). He preferred to paint in a studio using sketches made outdoors. "I see too much when I try to paint from the subject itself," he once said.

== Writer ==
The prep school that Rosenberg attended prided itself on the strength of its English Language and Literature courses and, after graduating from it, he considered whether he might become a man of letters. During his years as an undergraduate at Columbia College, he wrote poetry and performed in a theater group called the Don Quixote Club. He later reported that one of his professors, the critic and poet, George Edward Woodberry, helped to foster this ambition. As a senior in 1895, he helped found and edit a Columbia literary magazine called "The Morningside." (Note: In 1906 "The Morningside" was merged into the Columbia Literary Monthly.)

=== Poetry ===
In 1897, Rosenberg co-edited a compilation of poetry by Columbia University students called Columbia Verse (New York, W.B. Harison). The other editor was his fellow student and later law partner, Joseph M. Proskauer. Rosenberg contributed poems called "Ah, She Lurks," "Let Us Love and Laugh To-day," "Man," "God," "Darkness," "Fragment," and "The Nineteenth Psalm." In 1900 he contributed poems to an alumni-authors issue of the Columbia Literary Monthly. In 1926 he wrote a long poem about antisemitism in Europe called "Roman Holiday: Conversation Piece," which was not published until 1947 (New York, T. Yoseloff). His play, Punchinello (New York, Mitchell Kennerley, 1923) was written in free verse.

=== Theater ===
Having already established himself as lawyer, philanthropist, and artist, Rosenberg made a name for himself as dramatist with the publication, in 1917, of a play, "The Return to Mutton," and its performance in Manhattan the following year. One critic said the play was witty and clever, having a predictable plot, but interesting situation and characters. Another dismissed its publication as a waste of paper. A Manhattan repertoire company, the Henderson Players, considered the play to be one of its most popular productions during the spring season of 1918. In 1919, Rosenberg joined the advisory group of the Theatre Guild and a few years later published another play, "Punchinello, a Ballet," which received positive reviews from book critics but which does not appear in databases of plays that were produced at that time. One critic called it "swift, bright, and clever," and another said "reading it is an unqualified delight." The play's publisher, Mitchell Kennerley was a gallery owner as well as editor and publisher. President of Anderson Galleries, from 1916 to 1929, he had shown Rosenberg's works along with Marsden Hartley's in a 1921 exhibition. The name, Punchinello, was a variant of Punch from the Punch and Judy puppet shows.

In 1927 Rosenberg's play, Wall Street; A Romantic Melodrama, was performed in the Hudson Theatre on Broadway. Starring Arthur Hohl, it portrayed the downfall of fast-rising and double-dealing stockbrokers and the inevitable losses suffered by their customers. Critics gave it mixed reviews, one summarizing the plot as, "a group of soulless, money mad, soul withered human animals deliberately try[ing] to beat the oldest and most obvious of natural laws and suffer[ing] the prescribed penalty."

=== Law ===
Rosenberg wrote legal treatises and articles in law journals on bankruptcy and resulting corporate reorganizations. He also wrote on the legal aspects of his humanitarian concerns. The articles appeared mainly in the Columbia Law Review. (Note: They include "A New Scheme of Reorganization" (Columbia Law Review, Vol. 17, No. 6, June 1917, pp. 523-537), "The Sherman Act and the War" (Columbia Law Review, Vol. 18, No. 2, February 1918, pp. 137-146), "The Ætna Explosives Case—A Milestone in Reorganization" (Columbia Law Review, Vol. 20, No. 7, November 1920), pp. 733-740), "Reorganization—The Next Step" (Columbia Law Review, Vol. 22, No. 1, January 1922, pp. 14-27), "Phipps v. Chicago, Rock Island & Pacific Ry. Co." (Columbia Law Review, Vol. 24, No. 3, March 1924, pp. 266-272), and "Reorganization Yesterday Today Tomorrow" (Virginia Law Review, Vol. 25, No. 2, December 1938, pp. 129-164).) His book on reorganization is Corporate Reorganization and the Federal Court, written with Robert T Swaine and Roberts Walker (New York, Baker, Voorhis & Co., 1924).

=== Humanitarianism ===
Publications containing interviews, lectures, and newspaper articles flowed from Rosenberg's extensive work to achieve humanitarian goals. Throughout his adult life he wrote articles, books, and opinion pieces aimed at protecting freedom of speech, ending the persecution of minority communities, aiding refugees, mitigating conflict among nations, and preventing the recurrence of genocide. In 1918, he wrote a treatise on President Wilson's proposals for a world court and in 1925 wrote two articles on strengthening the world court that had been set up by the League of Nations, one in the Columbia Law Review and the other in The Nation. In 1938 he wrote an article on freedom of speech in Public Opinion Quarterley. In 1947, he wrote a short work on the United Nations Universal Declaration of Human Rights. In 1928, he wrote Censorship in the United States (New York, Court Press, 1928).

=== Art ===
From 1920 to 1922, Rosenberg spent a brief time as an art critic, writing articles for the profusely illustrated American edition of the British periodical, International Studio. In the issue for December 1920, he reviewed a large exhibition put on by the Society of American Artists. He thought much of the work was complacent and imitative, but praised Rockwell Kent for his "inviolability of self" in being sensitive to the work of others, but nonetheless completely himself. March 1921 he wrote an appreciation of Edgar Degas in which he said Degas was an aristocrat who saw the world clearly enough to depict it without sentimentality or prejudice. In April 1921, he reviewed the large exhibitions of the National Academy of Design and Society of Independent Artists of that season, deploring widespread imitation of outmoded European styles on the one hand and praising instances of American originality on the other. In the issue of May 1921, he gave a glowing review to a book called Art and I by C. Lewis Hind (New York, John Lane & Co. 1921). In the issue for August of that year he wrote an ironic comparison of engraved stock certificates versus artists' etchings from a collector's point of view. Like all artists, Rosenberg was given credit as author of art exhibition catalogs for the solo shows in which he participated as well as those in which he was a major participant. (Note: Rosenberg's art exhibition catalogs include Pastel Expressions (New York, Mitchell Kennerley, 1919), Seventy-five Pictures by James N. Rosenburg and 117 Pictures by Marsden Hartley (New York, Anderson Galleries, 1921), New Pictures and the New Gallery (New York, New Gallery, 1923), Paintings by James N. Rosenberg (Beverly Hills, Francis Taylor Galleries, 1947), James N. Rosenberg (Cambridge, Fogg Art Museum, 1950), Painter's Harvest : an Exhibit of paintings and Drawings by James N. Rosenberg (New York, Jewish Museum, 1958), James N. Rosenberg (Beverly Hills, Paul Kantor Gallery, 1959), An Exhibition of Paintings by James N. Rose[n]berg at Brandeis University April 25-May 9, 1963 (New York, Kaufmann Art Gallery, 1963), and Retrospective: Rosenberg.: Paintings, Drawings, and Prints by James N. Rosenberg (Plattsburg, Plattsburg University, 1964).) Some of Rosenberg's prints were also reproduced in a book called 50 lithographs [by] James N. Rosenberg (New York, H.N. Abrams, 1964).

=== Other writings ===
Rosenberg wrote two memoirs and his son-in-law, Maxwell Geismar, edited a compilation of his papers. On the Steppes (New York, London, A.A. Knopf, 1927) recorded his experiences in Eastern Europe and, in particular, Soviet Russia, during the time he spent there as head of the American Jewish Joint Distribution Commission for Europe and as president of the American Society for Jewish farm settlements in Russia. A Painter's Self-Portrait (New York : Crown Publishers, 1958) has a great number of reproductions of his work but gives his life story and is a more balanced account than the title suggests. (Note: Among the book's many anecdotes is an account of a donation of $5,000,000 to the project for resettlement of Jewish refugees in the Crimea. Rosenberg writes that Julius Rosenwald promised the funds and then, on saying goodbye, took the subway train to his next meeting although he had been offered a ride in Felix Warburg's car.) Unfinished Business (Mamaroneck, Vincent Marasia Press, 1967) is a selection from Rosenberg's personal archives. Like Painter's Self-Portrait it includes many reproductions artworks and recounts his life story.

== Personal life and family ==
I was born with the gift of an enormous capacity for life and I have been willing to accept all of life's terms.

Rosenberg was born in Allegheny City, Pennsylvania on November 20, 1874. His father was Henry Rosenberg (born in Bavaria in 1846, died in New York in 1927). During Rosenberg's early childhood his father was an officer with a Pittsburgh insurance company, the Modern Life and Improvement Trust Company. In 1879 the family moved to Manhattan where Henry Rosenberg joined his brothers-in-law, Max and William Naumburg, in a wholesale clothing business called M & W Naumburg. (Note: M & W Naumburg was known as a supplier of high-quality men's wear. The firm had been founded in 1876 by Max and William Naumburg's uncle, Elkan Naumburg, as Naumburg, Kraus, Lauer & Co. At the time of its dissolution in 1921 it was said to be the second oldest clothing manufacturing company in New York and one of the largest in the country.) Rosenberg's mother was Henrietta Naumburg Rosenberg (born in 1850 in Maryland, died in 1944 in Manhattan). He had two sisters, Minnie, born in 1876, who did not marry and who lived with her parents and then with her brother, and Florence (1889-1918), who married a physician, Morton E. Hart, and lived in California.

In 1905, Rosenberg married Bessie Herman (1875–1979). She was born in Baltimore to Joseph M. Herman (1851-1920), a successful Boston shoe manufacturer, and Hennie (Adler) Herman (1862–1950). The Rosenbergs had two daughters and a son. The elder daughter was Elizabeth Rosenberg Zetzel (1907-1970) who served as a Major in the British Army during World War II and who subsequently became a well-known psychiatrist and early advocate for the use of psychiatric drugs in combination with psychotherapy rather than psychotherapy alone. The younger daughter, Anne (1909–2011) was an editor and author. She is best known for being the supportive wife of Maxwell Geismar (1909–1979). He was a left-leaning literary historian and book critic who became famous for his attack on the literary establishment for its adulation of the works of Henry James. He was also editor of Rosenberg's last publication, Unfinished Business: James N. Rosenberg Papers (Marasia Press, 1967). Rosenberg's son, Robert Rosenberg (1922-2014), was a stockbroker who served as a U.S. Army Air Force pilot during World War II.

Rosenberg's Naumburg relatives were notable for their civic engagement, for their patronage of art and music, and for the extent of their philanthropy. Rosenberg's uncle Max had a daughter, Alice (1881–1959), who, in 1903, married his classmate and law partner, Joseph Proskauer. Alice Naumburg Proskauer became well known in New York as an urban planning specialist, advocate for fair treatment of tenants, and proponent of affordable housing. She was a director of the New York Urban League and of the New York City Housing Corporation. She headed the Housing Section of New York's Welfare Council and played a major role in the construction of the Sunnyside Gardens housing development in Queens.

Rosenberg's great-uncle, Elkan Naumburg, created a fund for an annual series of summer orchestra concerts in New York's Central Park and donated the band shell where the performances are held. His sons, George (1876–1970) and Walter (1867–1959), liquidated their successful banking business to devote themselves to charitable causes. They supported the Central Park orchestra concerts begun by their father. In addition, George Naumburg was a founder and vice president of Parents' Magazine and supporter a variety of child welfare organizations. He also supported and helped to direct organizations devoted to resettling refugees who fled Nazi oppression. Walter Naumburg founded the Naumburg Foundation, which sponsors debuts for young classical musicians that are said to be among oldest and most prestigious music competitions in the world.

Rosenberg's uncle, Aaron Naumburg (1859–1928), was a wealthy New York hat manufacturer who assembled a collection of old master paintings that his wife left to Harvard at his death along with funds for the construction of a new wing on the university museum and the placement within the wing of the "Naumburg Rooms," a Jacobean hall that Aaron Naumburg and his wife had installed within the large apartment where they lived.

His aunt, Margaret Naumburg (1890-1983), was a child education specialist who established the first Montessori school in the United States in 1914 and the Walden School in 1915. She was a connoisseur of contemporary art and enthusiastic proponent of art therapy.

Rosenberg's maternal grandfather was Louis Naumburg (1813–1902). Coming from a long line of cantors dating back to 1612, he was himself a cantor as well as rabbi. From 1865 to 1870 he led the Rodef Shalom Congregation which was the first synagogue established in Pittsburgh. Louis Naumburg's daughter, Carrie (1849-1947) was a philanthropist and wife of Judge Josiah Cohen (1840-1930), president of Rodef Shalom Congregation and, after Oliver Wendell Holmes, the second oldest jurist in the country.

Both the Rosenberg and Naumburg families supported the Society for Ethical Culture in New York. Rosenberg's parents joined the society and he was a student at the Ethical Culture School. His Naumburg cousins also studied there and one of them, Eleanor Naumburg Sanger was one of its teachers. Rosenberg's uncles Max, William, and Edward Naumburg and their wives were enthusiastic supporters.

Rosenberg's family and some of his Naumburg relatives lived on the Upper West Side in Manhattan and owned summer homes in what was then the fashionable summer colony of Far Rockaway in Queens. Rosenberg was active in local organizations in that vicinity.

Rosenberg died on July 21, 1970, in White Plains, New York. He had been living for many years in neighboring Scarsdale. A tribute from the officers and directors of the Joint Distribution Committee described him as a "noted attorney and distinguished artist, above all a great humanitarian, one who devoted more than half his life to the service of needy Jews overseas and at home."
