= Frederick Gunn =

Frederick Gunn may refer to:

- Frederick William Gunn, abolitionist who founded The Gunnery and America's first summer camp
- Frederick C. Gunn, architect in the United States
