= Pauline Hanauer Rosenberg =

American activist

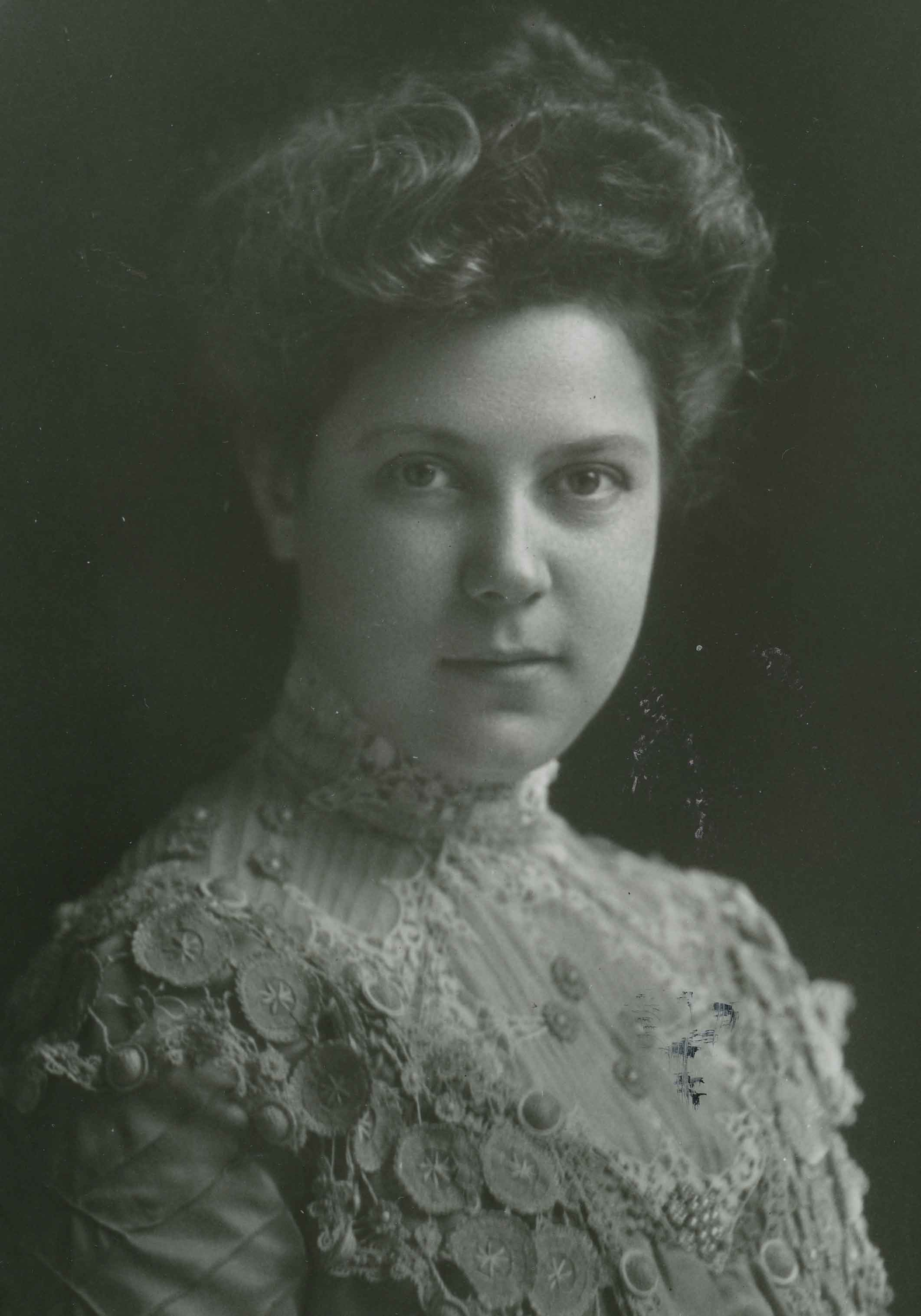
Pauline Hanauer Rosenberg

Pauline Hanauer Rosenberg (née, Hanauer; May 24, 1863 – October 16, 1940) was an American progressive activist who devoted her life to advancing the well-being and rights of women, children, and immigrants. She served as the first vice president and second president of the National Council of Jewish Women.

== Early life and education ==
Born in Allegheny, Pennsylvania, in 1863 into a middle-class German Jewish family, she was the daughter of Henrietta (née Lehrberger) and Mayer Hanauer. The family were prominent members of the Jewish community, belonging to Rodef Shalom and the Concordia Club. Henrietta was a member of the Hebrew Aid Society and Myer a leader at the local B'nai B'rith. Pauline studied at the Pittsburgh's Public Central High School and Barnard College before taking graduate courses at Columbia University, and the University of Pittsburgh.

== Career ==
While attending the World's Fair in Chicago in 1893, she and several other women founded the National Council of Jewish Women, and she subsequently founded the Pittsburgh section (Columbian Council) and organized other sections in Pennsylvania (Philadelphia, Oil City, Bradford, Scranton) and beyond (Youngstown, Washington, D.C.). Rosenberg served as president of the Women's Club of Pittsburgh and of the National Council of Jewish Women. While president of the Columbian Council she founded the Irene Kaufmann Settlement in Pittsburgh, the first juvenile court, and the first public, non-sectarian kindergarten in Pittsburgh. Among other work, the council would also go on to found the Committee for the Jewish and Non-Jewish Blind, which eventually became the Pittsburgh Association for the Blind, and is today the Pennsylvania Association for the Blind.

In addition to her efforts with the National Council of Jewish Women, Rosenberg served on the Lady Board of Allegheny General Hospital, the Pennsylvania Federation of Women's Clubs, the Pittsburgh's Woman's Club, the Civic Club, the Needlework Guild, the Free Kindergarten Association, the Tenement House and Public Bath Committee, and the Personal Service Society among other organizations.

During her presidency of the NCJW she would leave Pittsburgh for Philadelphia and then New York.

== Death and legacy ==
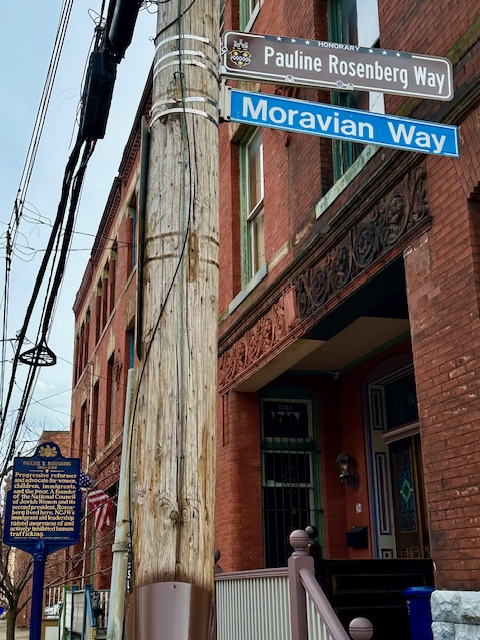

She died in New York City in 1940.

Since her death, Rosenberg and her work have been formally recognized for their historical significance. In 2020 the City of Pittsburgh declared her home, the Hanauer-Rosenberg Residence, an historic landmark. In 2022 the Commonwealth of Pennsylvania awarded a State Historic Marker out front of her former home and in 2024 the City of Pittsburgh dedicated the adjacent "Honorary Pauline Rosenberg Way."
