= Irene Kaufmann Settlement =

Coordinates: 40.4429°N 79.9817°W

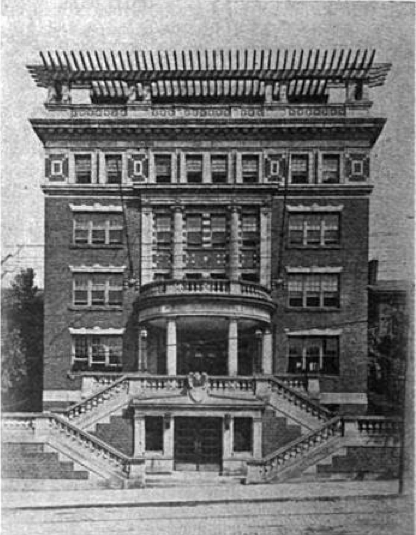
Irene Kaufmann Settlement

Irene Kaufmann Settlement (IKS), known as the Columbian School and Settlement from 1895 to 1910, was a settlement house located in Pittsburgh, Pennsylvania, US, at 1835 Center Avenue. It was the idea of Pauline Hanauer Rosenberg and established by the Columbian Council (now known as the National Council of Jewish Women - Pittsburgh Section) for moral, educational, and religious training. "The special purposes of the Settlement is the advancement of the civic, intellectual and social welfare of the surrounding community. It aims to do this (1) by guiding the foreign-born to American conditions, (2) encouraging self-improvement, (3) stimulating healthy pleasures, (4) broadening civic interests, (5) creating ideals of conduct. The place is a home in the life of its residents, an institution in the service of its friends, a school in the work of its teachers, a club house in the social uses of its neighbors, a civic organization in the interests of the community, a Settlement in the choice of its location".

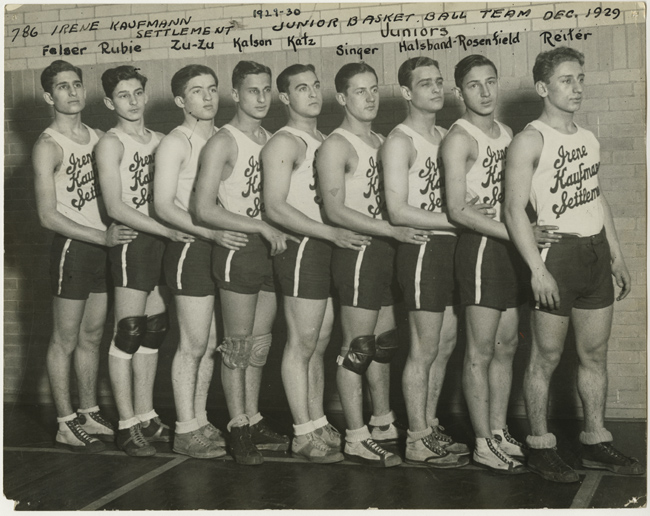
Irene Kaufmann Settlement, junior basketball team, Dec. 1929

At the geographical center of the Lower Hill District (Pittsburgh's most populous district at that time), the IKS made its service available to anyone who needed its aid. It coordinated services with the Jewish Federated Philanthropies, the Municipal Safety and Health Departments, the Labor Bureau of the Council of Jewish Women, the public schools, the Associated Charities, the Juvenile Court, the Housing Commission, and the Emma Farm. The IKS housed under its roof 17 outside organizations, including various trade unions and socialist groups. It maintained a public bath and public laundry, and a summer camp.

It had a resident staff of seven; additionally, 170 volunteers gave one or more hours each week to some form of social service in the district. The property of the Irene Kaufmann Settlement covered an area of 200 by 60 feet (61 m × 18 m). The settlement building was erected in 1910. It was of steel frame construction with yellow brick, and five stories high. There were 67 rooms in the main building, and a gymnasium and public bath in the rear, that building being known as the Peacock Public Bath. The settlement building was dedicated March 29, 1911. It was a monument to the memory of Irene Kaufmann, daughter of Mr. and Mrs. Henry Kaufmann, owners of Kaufmann's Department Store, one of the largest stores in Pittsburgh. Miss Kaufmann died in 1907.

== See also ==
- History of the Jews in Pittsburgh
- Settlement and community houses in the United States

== Gallery ==
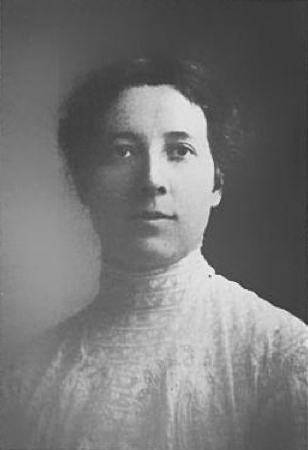
Addie S. Weihl, head worker, Columbia Settlement

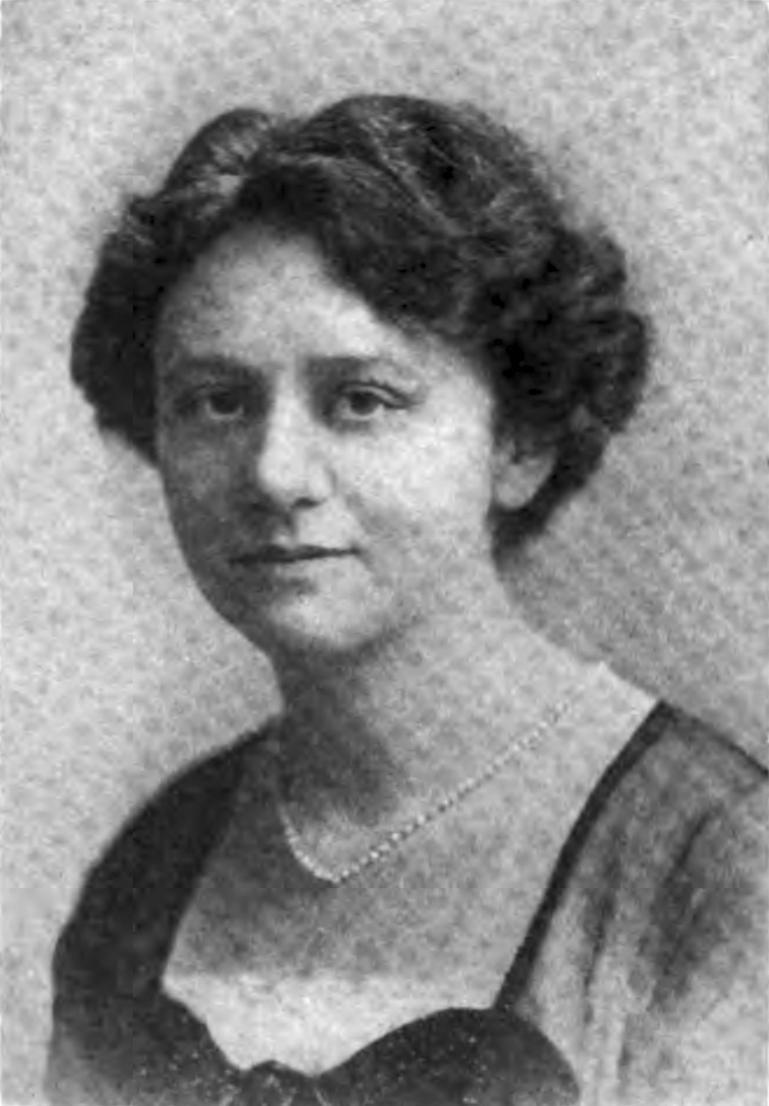
Julia Schoenfeld, Irene Kaufmann Settlement
