= The Frederick Gunn School =

Prep school in Washington, Connecticut, US

Coordinates: 41.6303°N 73.3118°W

Location
- 99 Green Hill Road; Washington, Connecticut 06793; United States

Information
- Type: Private, College prep Day & Boarding
- Motto: Vir Bonus Semper Discipulus Est (A Good Person Is Always Learning)
- Established: 1850; 176 years ago
- CEEB code: 070-825
- Dean: Ashley LeBlanc
- Principal: Emily Gum
- Faculty: 55
- Grades: 9–12/PG year
- Gender: Coeducational
- Enrollment: 315 (2021–22)
- Average class size: 12 students
- Student to teacher ratio: 6:1
- Campus size: 220 acres (0.89 km^{2})
- Campus type: Rural
- Colors: Red and black
- Athletics conference: NEPSAC
- Sports: 35 sports teams
- Team name: Highlanders
- Accreditation: NEASC
- Newspaper: The Highlander
- Tuition: – Boarding Students: $66,523 – Day Students: $47,234
- Website: www.frederickgunn.org

The Frederick Gunn School is a private, coeducational, boarding and day prep school for students in grades 9–12 and postgraduate, located in rural Connecticut, United States. The 220-acre (0.89 km^{2}) campus borders the village green of Washington, a small, historic town in Litchfield Hills. Formerly known as The Gunnery and Mr. Gunn's School, it was named for its founder, has no military affiliations and is a non-sectarian school.

The Frederick Gunn School was founded in 1850 by Frederick W. Gunn, a teacher, abolitionist, and father of recreational camping in America, based on his belief that strength of character was the goal of education.

== History ==
Formerly known as The Gunnery, The Frederick Gunn School was founded by Frederick William Gunn and his wife Abigail in 1850. It was originally 30 boys on 50 acres (20 ha). In 1894 The Ridge School was founded as an affiliated junior school for younger boys. The school offered a classical education typical of Anglican tradition schools of the time but also emphasized athletic opportunities, environmental awareness and moral values. In a less inclusive era, the Gunns' school welcomed girls, international students and African American students.

In the 1920s the school became an all-boys school, enrollment tripled and new buildings were added. During World War II, The Gunnery prepared boys for entering the armed forces. In 1977, The Gunnery returned to its coeducational roots. For several years prior, The Gunnery had a partnership with the nearby all-girls school Wykeham Rise, which has since closed. The first female head was appointed in 1991.

== Boarding ==
The Frederick Gunn School is a day and boarding school, with 73% (232 boarders, 83 day) of its students residing in one of the 10 dormitories on campus. Students are supported by teachers, coaches, faculty advisors, dorm parents, administrators and student leaders who are designated as Residential Assistants (RAs). In most dormitories, students are grouped by class. Each dormitory consists primarily of single and double student rooms, but also house faculty and their families. There are students from 22 countries and 22 states in the U.S. Students from the Bahamas, Bahrain, Bermuda, Brazil, Canada, China, Germany, Hong Kong, Hungary, India, Korea, Mexico, Moldova, Saudi Arabia, Spain, Sweden, the United Kingdom, Vietnam and the U.S. Virgin Islands were included in the student body in the 2021–22 academic year.

== Athletics ==
=== Championships ===
- 1987 – Boys Ice Hockey – WNEPSAC Championship
- 1988 – Boys Ice Hockey – WNEPSAC Championship
- 1989 – Boys Soccer – WNEPSAC Division II Championship
- 1990 – Boys Ice Hockey – WNEPSAC Championship
- 2002 – Girls Ice Hockey – New England Division II Champions
- 2004 – Boys Baseball – Western New England Prep Baseball League Champions
- 2007 – Boys Baseball – Western New England Prep Baseball League Champions
- 2007 – Girls Lacrosse – New England Class B Co-Champions
- 2009 – Boys Baseball – Western New England Prep Baseball League Champions
- 2012 – Girls Field Hockey – New England Class C New England Champions
- 2013 – Girls Ice Hockey – New England Division II Champions
- 2013 – Boys Hockey – Edward G. Watkins New Years Tournament Champion
- 2014 – Girls Ice Hockey – New England Division II Champions
- 2014 – Boys Crew – National Scholastic Championship Regatta Champions
- 2015 – Boys Hockey – Edward G. Watkins New Years Tournament Champion
- 2016 – Boys Hockey – New England Elite Eight Tournament Champion
- 2016 – Boys Lacrosse – WNESSLA Champions
- 2016 – Boys Lacrosse – Colonial Tournament Champions
- 2016 – Boys Football – New England Eight-Player Football Champions
- 2017 – Boys Hockey – Avon Old Farms Christmas Classic Champions
- 2018 – Boys Hockey – Avon Old Farms Christmas Classic Champions
- 2019 – Girls Cross Country NEPSTA DIII Cross Country Champions
- 2019 – Boys Crew – Beebe Cup Winner
- 2019 – Boys Crew – Du. Pont Cup Winner
- 2019 – Boys Crew – Head of the Riverfront Regatta, first place, junior 4+
- 2020 – Boys Hockey – NEPSAC Tournament Piatelli/Simmons (Small) Bracket Champion

== Notable alumni ==
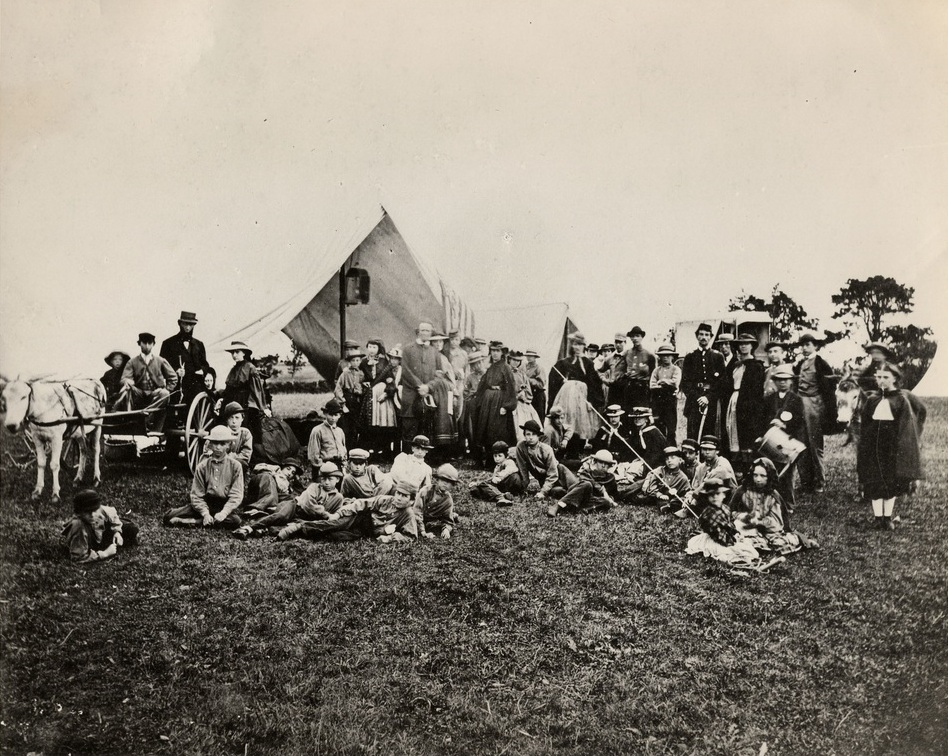
Gunnery Camp, called the first organized summer camp

- Gerald Warner Brace, novelist
- Justin Dunn (2013), Major League Baseball player
- Edsel Ford II (1968), director of Ford Motor Company
- George Grande (1964), Major League Baseball announcer
- P. J. Higgins (2012), Major League Baseball player
- Andrew Lack (1964), chairman of NBC News
- Dick Lehr (1972), journalist
- Kayla Meneghin, professional hockey player
- Noemi Neubauerová, professional hockey player
- Kristýna Pátková professional hockey player
- Sam Posey (1962), professional racing driver
- James N. Rosenberg (1895), lawyer
- Jesse Lee Soffer (2003), actor
- Sean P. Stellato (1997), NFL Agent / Author
- Peter C. Sutton (1968), art historian
- C. Whitney Tillinghast 2nd, Adjutant General of New York
- Jonathan Tisch (1972), businessman
- Steve Tisch (1968), businessman
- Sam Walther, professional hockey player
- Dick Wolf (1965), television producer
