= Julia Schoenfeld =

Jewish-American social worker

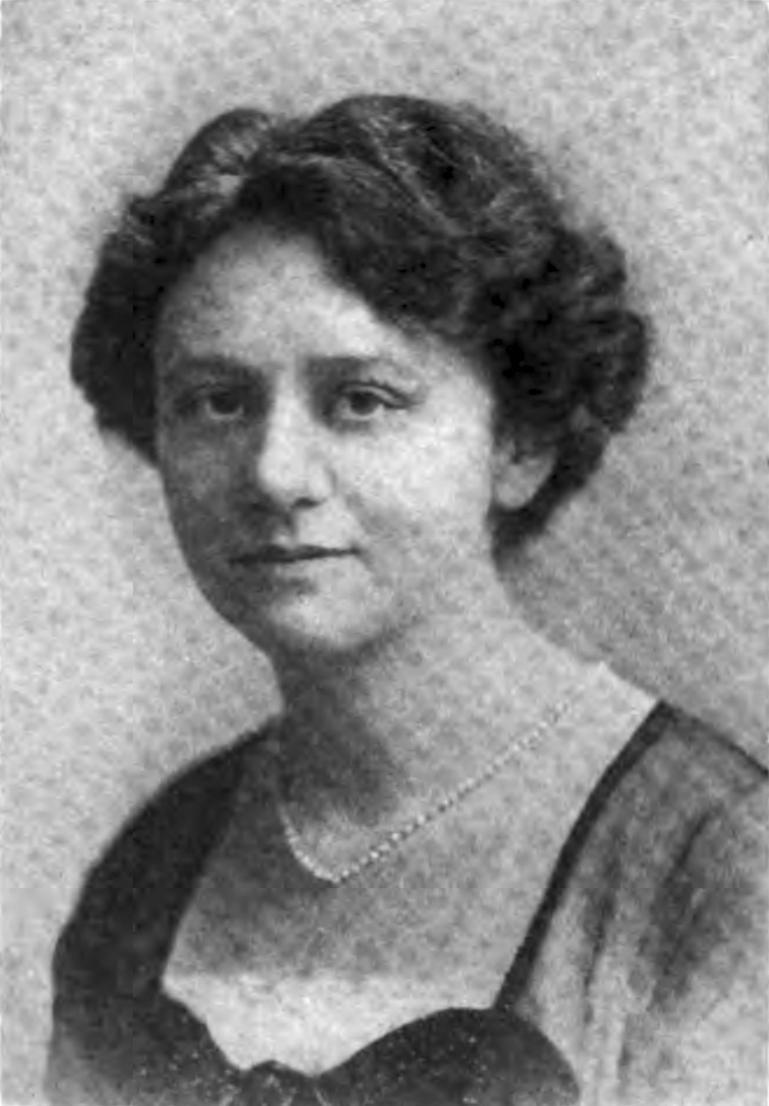
- Julia Schoenfeld (circa 1914)
- Born: April 19, 1878; Bellaire, Ohio, U.S.
- Occupation: Social Worker

Julia Schoenfeld (April 19, 1878 – ?) was a Jewish-American social worker, writer, and activist. During the period of her settlement work, Schoenfeld became interested in recreation for working girls, a subject on which she became a recognized authority. Her investigation of public dance halls in New York City, undertaken in 1908 while she was secretary of the Committee on the Amusement Resources of Working Girls, was the basis for the model New York City ordinance regulating dance halls. Later, as secretary of the Playground and Recreation Association of America (now known as the National Recreation and Park Association), she conducted dance hall investigations in Boston, Massachusetts, St. Joseph, Missouri, Johnstown, Pennsylvania, and Pittsburgh, Pennsylvania.

== Early years and education ==
Schoenfeld was born in Bellaire, Ohio, of German-Jewish parentage. Her father, Alexander Schoenfeld, was born in Germany and migrated when a very young man to the US. Her mother, Rose Hartman, was born in Frederick, Maryland, the daughter of German parents. When Schoenfeld was a few months old, her parents moved to Columbus, Ohio, and engaged in mercantile enterprises, before the family moved to Meadville, Pennsylvania, which was chosen for their home on account of its educational advantages. It was a college town with musical schools, where children could be given opportunities at a small cost. Schoenfeld was graduated from the public schools of Meadville and entered Allegheny College in 1804, being graduated in 1897. She decided to study medicine and entered the Woman's Medical College at Toronto, Canada, but with her father's objections to her being a professional woman, she gave up her work.

== Career ==
While at school in Toronto, the family moved to Johnstown, Pennsylvania. On Schoenfeld's return, she was asked to assist with a settlement in the Jewish district in Pittsburgh and was requested to undertake the establishment of it. Though only 21 years of age, she offered her services to those interested in the movement and helped develop the Columbian Council School and Settlement. After three years' residence at the settlement, Schoenfeld left on account of ill health and returned to Johnstown in 1902. She then organized the Civic Club of Johnstown. The first work this club undertook was the establishment of the Juvenile Court and Schoenfeld, during the first year, served as volunteer probation officer. She also helped in the establishment of vacation schools and playgrounds. Her successor at the Columbian settlement remained but a year and she was again called to serve in the work in Pittsburgh, where she remained a year. Later an opportunity offered to study vacation and amusement resources of working girls in New York City. In 1908, Schoenfeld left for New York and as a result of her work there, New York passed legislation in regard to licensing and regulating dancing academies and public amusement parks. In 1911, Schoenfeld received a master's degree from Columbia University. She studied immigration and its relation to the protection of girls in the US, and as secretary of the committee on immigrant aid of the Council of Jewish Women, she developed the protective bureau for girls.

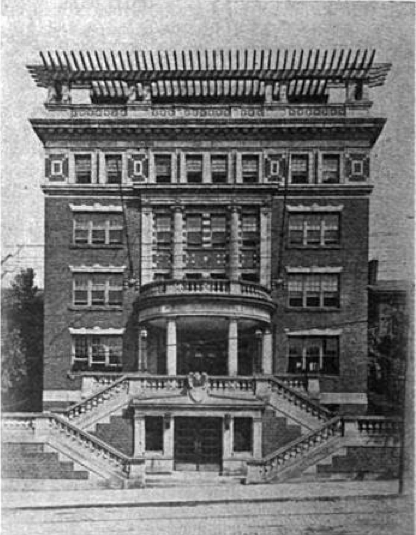
Irene Kaufmann Settlement

After three years as secretary of the Playground and Recreation Association, she was appointed head worker of the Irene Kauffman Settlement in Pittsburgh. She had worked there previously; 14 years agom when it was called the Columbian Council Settlement, she was the first head resident.

She visited many cities, studying the philanthropic and social work. She attended many conferences in the US and abroad. While in London in 1907, she made a close study of the Toynbee Hall and University Settlement. She was an active worker on the state committee and state confederation of Women's Clubs, also in the Consumers' League and with other state and national organizations for the improvement of working conditions among women and children. She has written many articles for the press and addressed many of the prominent clubs of the country. She is considered in her time to be one of the prominent women in the philanthropic work of the US.
