= Sam Walther =

American ice hockey goaltender

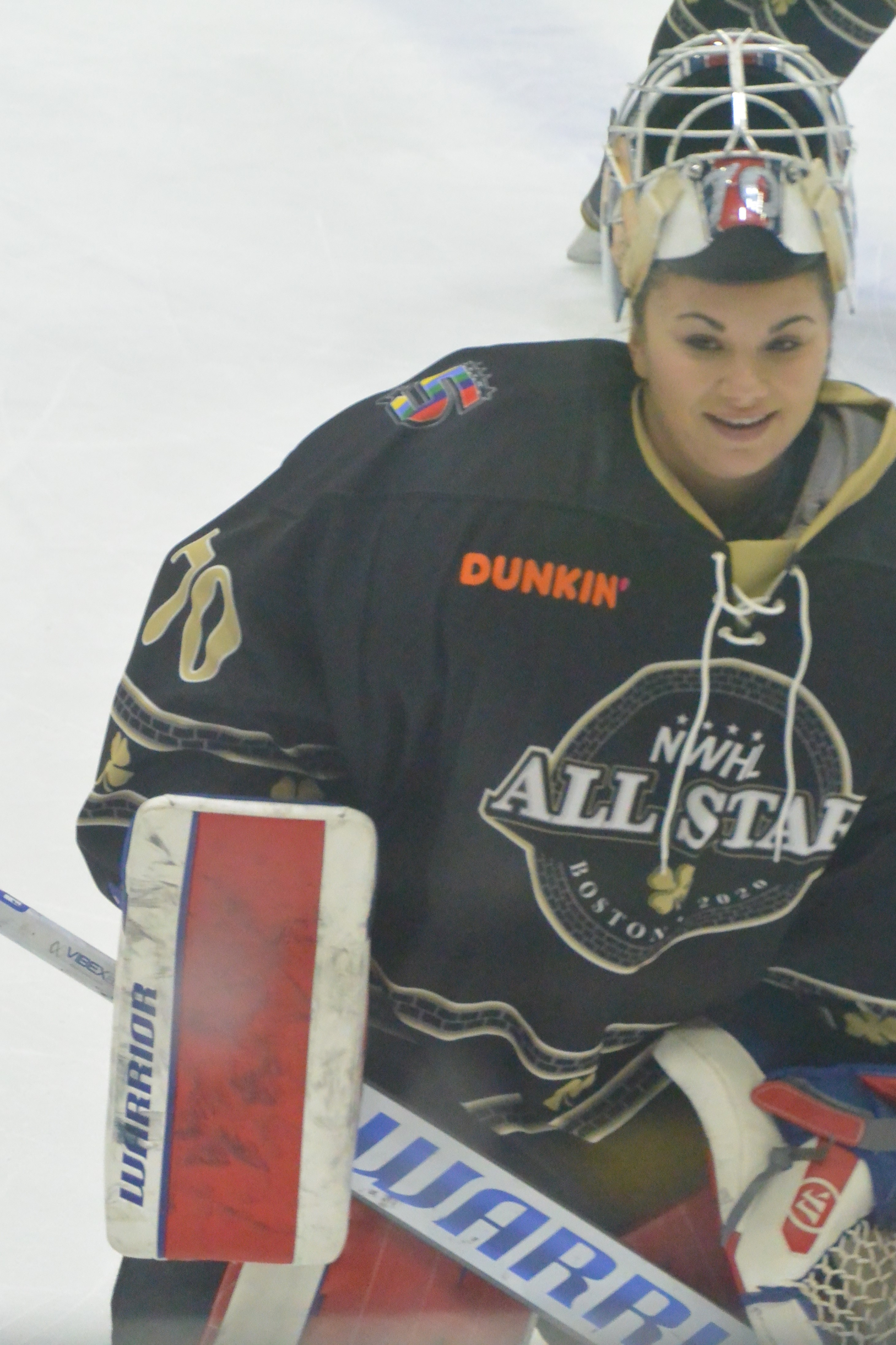
- Sam Walther at the 2020 NWHL All Star Game
- Born: July 16, 1996 (age 29) Gambrills, Maryland, United States
- Height: 5 ft 7 in (170 cm)
- Position: Goaltender
- Catches: Left
- Played for: Metropolitan Riveters; Connecticut Whale; Hamilton Continentals
- Playing career: 2014–present

Samantha "Sam" Walther (born July 16, 1996) is an American ice hockey goaltender. She played in the Premier Hockey Federation (PHF) with the Metropolitan Riveters and Connecticut Whale.

== Playing career ==
Walther attended The Gunnery, a private college-preparatory school in Washington, Connecticut, for secondary school. She spent four seasons with the school's women's ice hockey team in addition to playing soccer and lacrosse.

During her first three years attending The Gunnery, Walther simultaneously played with the Pittsburgh-based Pittsburgh Penguins Elite of the Tier 1 Elite Hockey League (T1EHL), the premier amateur youth hockey league in the United States. In her senior year of high school, she also played with the Connecticut Polar Bears of the USA Hockey Girls Tier I 19U.

=== Collegiate ===
Walther played her collegiate career with the Hamilton College in the New England Small College Athletic Conference (NESCAC) of the NCAA Division III. Her senior year, she was ranked second in the country with a save percentage of .960. Walther finished her hockey career at Hamilton College holding the program's records for best goals against average (1.40), highest save percentage (.948), and most shutouts (26). In 2018, she was awarded the Jack B. Riffle Award for the top female athlete in the senior class at Hamilton. Her senior year performance also earned her the title of 2018 NESCAC Player of the Year and as well as her second First Team All America Selection. Following her graduation, she became the first Hamilton graduate to sign with a professional women's hockey team.

During her time at Hamilton College, Walther suffered a torn MCL during a NESCAC quarterfinals game that ended in quadruple overtime. Walther made 80 saves, a career high.

=== NWHL ===
On July 10, 2018, Walther signed a professional contract with the Connecticut Whale. Following goaltender Mariya Sorokina's departure from the team, Walther became the backup to Whale goaltender Meeri Räisänen. Walther dressed for five games for the Whale.

In the 2019–20 season, Walther signed a contract with the Metropolitan Riveters. In her first starting goaltender role in the NWHL, Walther played 22 of 24 regular season games. She played in her first NWHL playoff game, making 30 saves on 31 shots in a tight overtime loss to the defending champions, the Minnesota Whitecaps. During the season, Walther sustained a hip injury after a collision with Whale defender Kaycie Anderson and missed two games. She was named as one of the goaltenders for Team Packer in the 2020 NWHL All-Star Game. Walther finished the season with a .892 save percentage and 3.74 goals against average.

In June 2020, Riveters' coach Ivo Mocek confirmed that Walther would not be returning to the team for the 2020–21 NWHL season. Walther later confirmed that she will not play in the 2021 season.

== Personal life ==
Walther served as an assistant coach with the Nichols Bison women's ice hockey program during the 2018–19 and 2019–20 seasons. During her time at Hamilton College, Walther earned her undergraduate degree in government. In addition to coaching at Nichols, Walther is also getting her graduate degree in Counterterrorism. She speaks Arabic, American Sign Language (ASL), and French.

She has named Washington Capitals goalie Braden Holtby as one of her role models, wearing number 70 because of him. Growing up, Walther was also a neighbour of Ken Klee in Annapolis.

Since 2018, Walther's been an ambassador for The Goalie Guild's Lift the Mask initiative to encourages mental health awareness among ice hockey goaltenders. Walther has also outwardly discussed being an advocate for mental health as an athlete.
