= Pittsburgh Jewish Chronicle =

Weekly newspaper in the Greater Pittsburgh Region

- Masthead since 2017
- Type: Weekly newspaper
- Publisher: Pittsburgh Jewish Publication and Education Foundation
- Editor: Toby Tabachnick
- Staff writers: Adam Reinherz; David Rullo
- Founded: March 8, 1962; 64 years ago
- Language: English
- Headquarters: Squirrel Hill
- City: Pittsburgh
- Country: United States
- Circulation: 8,500
- OCLC number: 2262912
- Website: jewishchronicle.timesofisrael.com
- Free online archives: digitalcollections.library.cmu.edu/cmu-collection/pittsburgh-jewish-newspapers

The Pittsburgh Jewish Chronicle is an American weekly newspaper published every Thursday for the Jewish community in the Greater Pittsburgh Region. The newspaper is owned and distributed by the Pittsburgh Jewish Publication and Education Foundation.

== History ==
The Jewish Criterion was established in 1895 to serve the Pittsburgh Jewish community as a weekly. In 1934, the American Jewish Outlook was established as well, and for a long time there were two newspapers to serve Jewish Pittsburghers. However, by the early 1960s, both were closed. The founding executive editor of the Jewish Chronicle in 1962 was Albert W. Bloom, then a reporter and science editor of the Pittsburgh Post-Gazette. Bloom wrote the editorials and a weekly column "People and Issues" for over 20 years. Under Bloom's leadership, the paper became one of the leading Jewish papers in the US, and ran a number of prize winning series. Bloom continued as editor until his retirement in 1983, when he also served as president of the American Jewish Press Association. Joel Roteman succeeded Bloom and edited the paper from 1984 to 2001.

== Content and audience ==
Because Pittsburgh has a relatively large population of Jews, especially in Squirrel Hill, the publication has a higher circulation than most other local Jewish newspapers. The Chronicle reports on news occurring in the local Jewish community and city as a whole as well as national and global news that is of Jewish interest, especially news related to Israel. It also extensively covers Jewish news in West Virginia, and is believed to be the only Jewish publication to pay consistent attention to Jewish activities in that state. The newspaper has a religious column called the Portion of the Week, usually written by a local rabbi or religious leader. Other features include advertisements, letters to the editors, and a calendar of upcoming community events.

== Awards ==
The Pittsburgh Jewish Chronicle received seven Rockower Awards in 2020. In 2023, it won the Service to Journalism award, awarded by the Press Club of Western Pennsylvania, as well as four Rockower Awards.

== See also ==
- History of the Jews in Pittsburgh
- List of Jewish newspapers
- Media in Pittsburgh
