= Elizabeth Zetzel =

American physician

Elizabeth Rosenberg Zetzel (1907–1970) was an American psychoanalyst and physician.

== Life ==
Elizabeth Zetzel was born on 17 March 1907 in New York, the daughter of the jurist and philanthropist James N. Rosenberg. She gained her first degree from Smith College, before studying medicine at the University of London. She underwent analytic training in the 1930s with the British Psychoanalytic Society (BPAS). Her training analyst was Ernest Jones, though she was also influenced by the ideas of Melanie Klein and Kleinians like Joan Riviere, Susan Sutherland Isaacs and Donald Winnicott.

In 1949 she returned to the United States. She became a training analyst and teacher at the Boston Psychoanalytic Society, and from 1961 to 1965 was also secretary of the International Psychoanalytic Association under Maxwell Gitelson as president.

Her papers are held at Harvard Library.

== Works ==
- 'Melanie Klein 1882-1960', The Psychoanalytic Quarterly, Vol. 30, pp. 420–425.
- 'The so-called good hysteric, The International Journal of Psychoanalysis, Vol. 49, No. 2-3 (1968), pp. 256–260
- 96 Gloucester Place: Some personal recollections, The International Journal of Psychoanalysis, Vol. 50, pp.717-719
- The capacity for emotional growth, 1970
- (with W.W. Meissner) Basic concepts of psychoanalytic psychiatry, 1973
