= Hanauer-Rosenberg Residence =

Historic building in Pittsburgh, Pennsylvania, U.S.

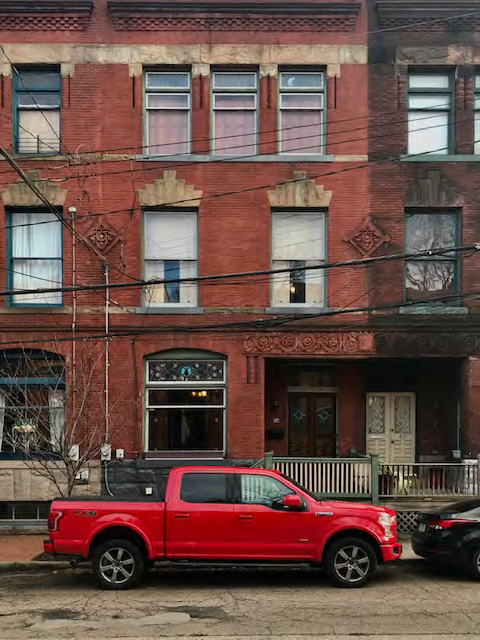
- The primary facade of the Hanauer-Rosenberg residence in December 2019.

- Location within Pittsburgh
- 40°27′08″N 80°00′02″W
- Location: 417 Lockhart Street, Pittsburgh, Pennsylvania, USA

History
- Built: 1889

The Hanauer-Rosenberg residence is located at 417 Lockhart Street in the nationally and locally historic neighborhood of Deutschtown in Pittsburgh, Pennsylvania. Built in 1888 in the Richardsonian Romanesque architectural style, the building was the residence of Pauline Hanauer-Rosenberg, founder of the National Council of Jewish Women. In March 2020, the Pennsylvania Historical & Museum Commission awarded a State Historic Marker at the residence to recognize Rosenberg's work. In May 2020, Preservation Pittsburgh nominated the residence to be considered a City of Pittsburgh Historic Landmark and in July 2020, the City of Pittsburgh's Historic Review Commission determined that this nomination was viable. The residence was listed on the National Register of Historic Places in 2025.

== History ==
In 1872, the site on which the Hanauer-Rosenberg residence would sit was owned by Caroline Nelson, who had 415 through 419 Lockhart Street built between 1888 and 1889. Caroline was married to William Nelson, Pittsburgh's first stained glass manufacturer, whose stained glass pieces in two of the houses on the Lockhart row is the only work of his that remains. The house's address was originally 16 Liberty Street, which was re-numbered 417 in 1899. Liberty Street became Lockhart Street circa 1909, when the city government changed a number of street names to avoid duplication from Pittsburgh's annexation of Allegheny City in 1907.

The Nelson family rented out the house to tenants, the first of whom were Hugo Rosenberg, a merchant, and Pauline Hanauer Rosenberg. Pauline founded the National Council of Jewish Women, its Pittsburgh section, and other Pennsylvania sections while living in the house, and she was also the national president of the organization in 1905. Pittsburgh social directories noted that Pauline received guests at the residence on the first and second Wednesdays of each month, and she also hosted meetings of the Pittsburgh Women's Club at the house. She also received out-of-town guests at 417 Lockhart St. who were prominent state and national members of progressive causes related to education, immigration, women's rights, and the Jewish community. Rosenberg's Columbian Council (the National Council of Jewish Women Pittsburgh section) letterhead listed her home at “16 Liberty Street, Allegheny, Pa.” as her official contact for business correspondence.

In the early 20th century, the Hanauer-Rosenberg house was used as a rooming house, and it was then owned and occupied by Joseph and Helen Seifert, who had bought it from the Nelson family for $7000 in 1921.

== Architecture ==
The Hanauer-Rosenberg residence is a rowhouse built in the Richardsonian Romanesque architectural style. This style is evident in many of the house's elements, such as its rough-cut stone ornamentation, terra cotta entrance ornamentation, medallions, belt course, and the rounded bricks at the front entrance. The house features numerous stained glass panes, such as those in the front door and in numerous doors throughout the house.

== Gallery ==
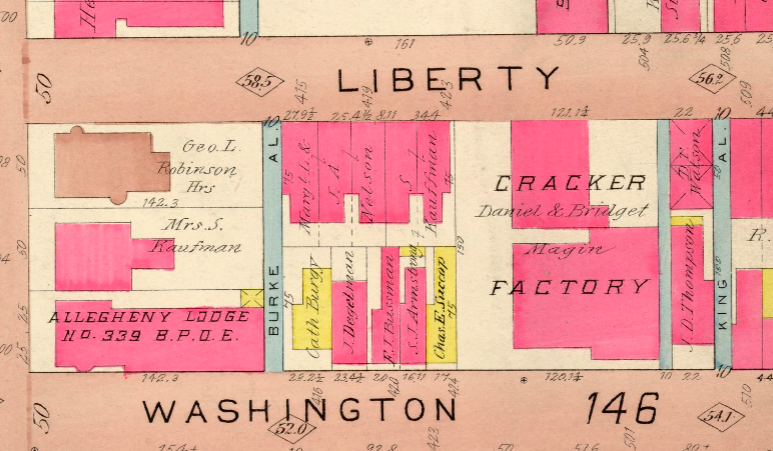
Excerpt from a 1907 plat map by G.M. Hopkins and Co., showing the Hanauer-Rosenberg residence under "J.A."

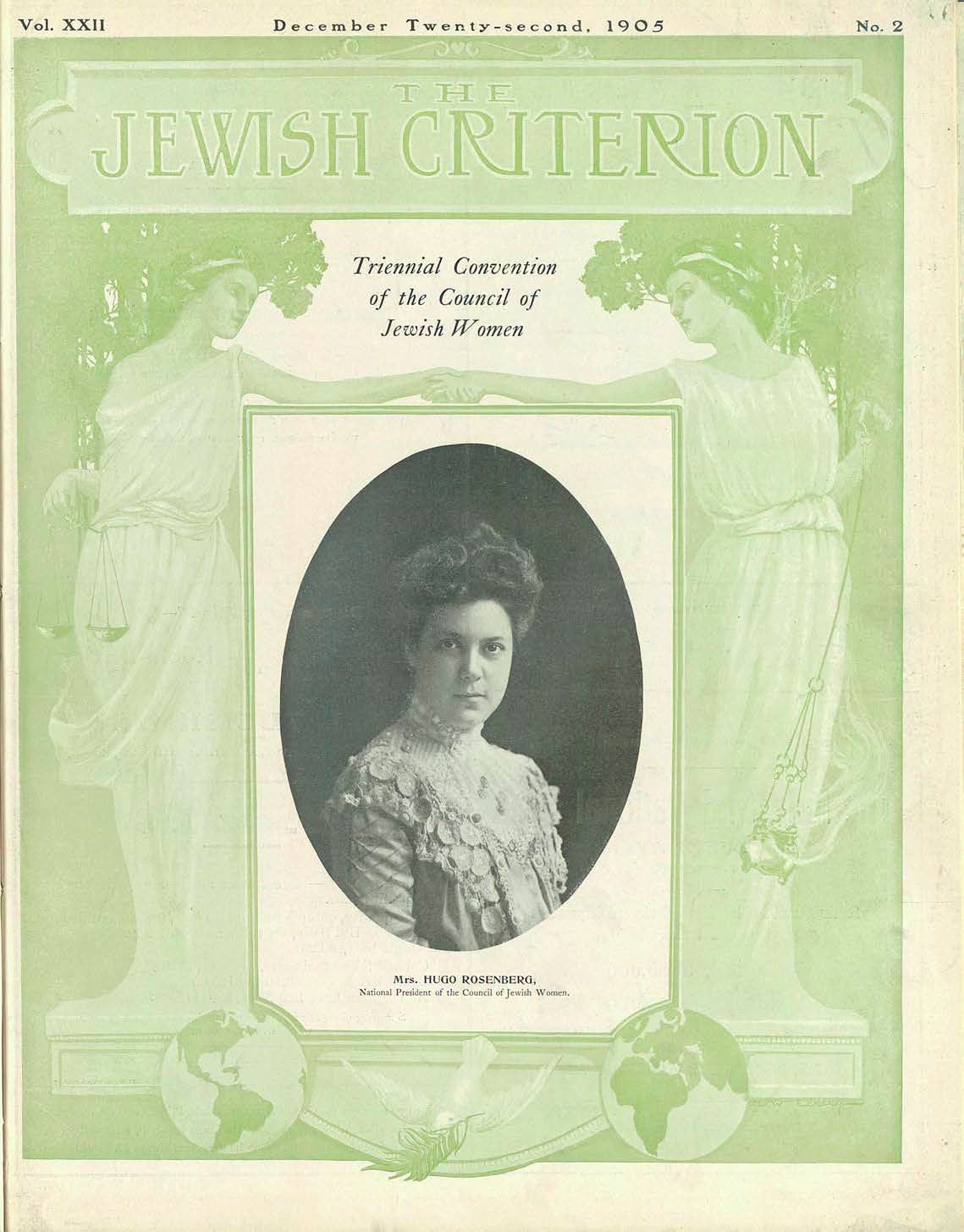
The cover of this Jewish Criterion paper from 1905 features Pauline H. Rosenberg.
