= J. Leonard Levy =

English-American rabbi (1865–1917)

Joseph Leonard Levy (November 24, 1865 – April 26, 1917) was an English-American rabbi who ministered in England and America.

== Life ==
Levy was born on November 24, 1865, in London, England, the son of Rabbi Solomon Levy and Elizabeth Cohen.

Levy graduated from University College London in 1884 and studied to be a rabbi at Jews' College. He then served as rabbi of Bristol Hebrew Congregation from 1885 to 1889. He immigrated to America in 1889 and became rabbi of Congregation B'nai Israel in Sacramento, California. He then served as associate rabbi of Congregation Keneseth Israel in Philadelphia, Pennsylvania, from 1893 to 1901. In 1898, he was elected chaplain of Keegan's Brigade and served with them during the Spanish–American War. He wrote a translation of the Rosh Hashanah tractate in 1895. He also wrote several other books, including multiple volumes of his sermons. While in Philadelphia, he founded the Home of Delight and the Philadelphia Sterilized Milk, Ice and Coal Company.

In 1901, Levy became rabbi of Rodef Shalom Congregation in Pittsburgh. He served as rabbi there until his death. A noted pulpit orator, he lectured throughout the United States and beyond. In 1905, he founded the Pittsburgh Peace Society. In 1908, he introduced the Interdenominational Thanksgiving to Pittsburgh. He was also a fellow of the Royal Society of Arts and the Royal Meteorological Society, a founder of the Transatlantic Society of America and the Anglo-American Society, president of the Mother's Pension League of Allegheny County, and a trustee of Hebrew Union College, the University of Pittsburgh, and the National Hospital for Consumptives.

In 1881, Levy married Henrietta Platnauer of Bristol, daughter of M. Joseph Platnauer. They had two daughters, Edna Sophie (wife of Joseph H. Barach) and Ruth (wife of Leon Falk).

Levy died at home of pneumonia on April 26, 1917. His funeral was held at Rodef Shalom, where Rabbi Stephen S. Wise delivered the eulogy. The funeral was attended by, among other people, Rodef Shalom's president Judge Josiah Cohen, Rabbi Joseph Silverman of New York City, Rabbi Isadore Philo of Youngstown, Ohio, Rabbi Abba Hillel Silver of Wheeling, West Virginia, Rabbi Moses J. Abels of Altoona, Rabbi Solomon Michael Neches of Congregation B'nai Israel, Rabbi Morris Mazure of the Tree of Life Congregation, Rabbi George Zepin of Cincinnati, Ohio, and Rabbi Schuman of Yonkers, New York. He was buried in West View Cemetery.
