= Josiah Cohen =

American judge (1840–1930)

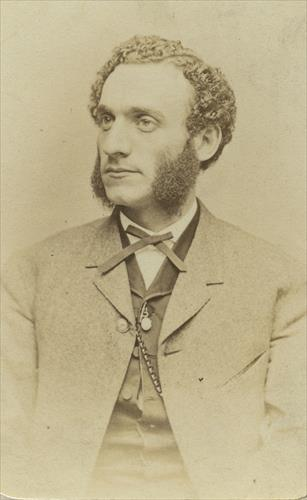
- Born: 29 November 1840; Plymouth, United Kingdom
- Died: 11 June 1930 (aged 89); Schenley Hotel, Pittsburgh, Pennsylvania
- Resting place: West View Cemetery, Pittsburgh
- Occupations: Lawyer, judge
- Relatives: James N. Rosenberg (nephew)

Josiah Cohen (29 November 1840 – 11 June 1930) was an American lawyer and judge.

== Biography ==
Josiah Cohen was born in Plymouth, England, to a Jewish family long settled in Cornwall, and immigrated to the United States in 1857. In 1860 he entered upon the duties of teacher in the school of the Rodef Shalom Congregation in Pittsburgh, and continued that vocation until 1866, when he was admitted to the bar of Allegheny County.

He was chairman of the Allegheny County Republican executive committee, and, in 1884, one of the members of the presidential election board for Pennsylvania. In 1901 he was appointed judge of the county's orphans' court.

Cohen was affiliated with most of the local and national Jewish organizations, being a founder and member of the executive committee of the Union of American Hebrew Congregations, and president of District Lodge No. 3, Independent Order B'nai B'rith, and of its court of appeals. He was elected as vice-president of B'nai B'rith in the United States in 1884. Cohen was also a life-member of the board of trustees of the Carnegie Institute of Pittsburgh.

At the time of his death in 1930 he was the second oldest active jurist in the country, after Oliver Wendell Holmes.
