= Rodef Shalom Congregation =

Reform synagogue in Easton, Pennsylvania, United States

- Hebrew: רודף שלום
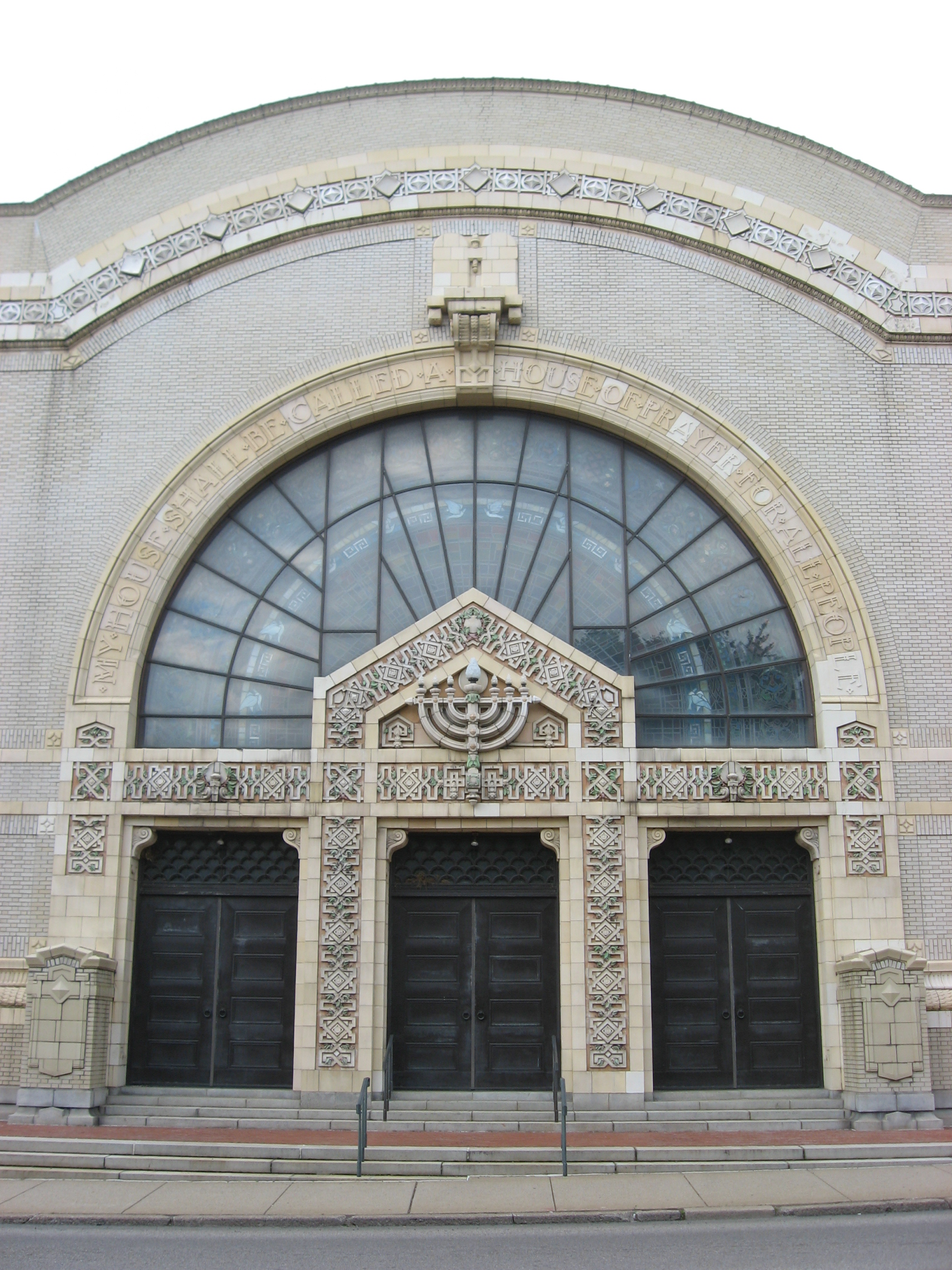
- Rodef Shalom's celebrated façade

- Location in Pittsburgh

Religion
- Affiliation: Reform Judaism
- Ecclesiastical or organisational status: Synagogue
- Leadership: Rabbi Sharyn H. Henry
- Status: Active

Location
- Location: 4905 Fifth Avenue, Pittsburgh, Pennsylvania
- Country: United States
- Coordinates: 40°26′53″N 79°56′37″W

Architecture
- Architects: Henry Hornbostel (1907); Ingham & Boyd (1938); Alexander Sharove (1956); Harry Lefkowitz (1956); The Design Alliance (2000)
- Type: Synagogue
- Style: Beaux-Arts
- Established: 1856 (as a congregation)
- Completed: 1906
- Construction cost: $250,000

Specifications
- Capacity: 1,200 worshippers
- Dome: One
- Dome dia. (outer): 90 feet (27 m)

Website
- rodefshalom.org
- Rodef Shalom Template
- U.S. National Register of Historic Places
- Pittsburgh Landmark – PHLF
- NRHP reference No.: 79002162

Significant dates
- Added to NRHP: November 5, 1979
- Designated PHLF: 2022

Rodef Shalom Congregation (Hebrew: רודף שלום, lit. 'Pursuer of Peace') is an historic Reform Jewish congregation and synagogue located at 4905 Fifth Avenue, Pittsburgh, Pennsylvania, in the United States. The landmark building was designed by architect Henry Hornbostel and completed in the Beaux-Arts style.

Located on Fifth Avenue on the border of the Oakland and Shadyside neighborhoods, it houses Congregation Rodef Shalom, founded in 1856, the oldest Jewish congregation in Western Pennsylvania and the largest Reform congregation in the area. On the grounds of the building is the Rodef Shalom Biblical Botanical Garden.

The synagogue building was entered into the National Register of Historic Places on November 5, 1979 and was listed as a Pittsburgh Historic Landmark in 2022.

== History ==
In 1847, a dozen Jewish Pittsburghers established a burial society they called Bes Almon (Mourners’ House) and purchased land on Troy Hill, on the city's North Side, for use as a cemetery.

=== Early years ===
By 1848, the group had rented a room downtown, on Penn Avenue and Sixth Street, and formed a congregation called Shaare Shemayim (Gate of Heaven). They practiced Orthodox Judaism.

The congregation's charter, dated November 9, 1856, gives as its primary objectives “the furtherance of the cause of Religion” and “the establishment of a good school in which the young shall be instructed in the principles of the Hebrew Religion as well as general branches of knowledge.”

Over the next eight years, some members twice split off into separate congregations, but then rejoined. Congregation Beth Israel (House of Israel) formed in 1852 but was back within a year. Another group separated in 1855, but rejoined in 1860, a year after Shaare Shemayim rented a hall on St. Clair Street in Allegheny City (now the North Side of the city of Pittsburgh). The re-merged congregations took the name Rodef Shalom at that time, with thirty-five member families, and fifty children enrolled in the school.

Outgrowing the rental, construction began on its own building in 1861. Designed by architect Charles Bartberger, the first temple was built on Hancock Street (now Eighth Street) in downtown Pittsburgh. The dedication ceremony, on March 20, 1862, featured Rev. William Armhold, Minister, addressing the congregation in German. Josiah Cohen, a teacher in the congregation's day school, delivered a speech in English. Pittsburgh's finest vocalist, Sigmund Apfelbaum performed.

=== Switch to Reform ===
The first Jewish confirmation in Pittsburgh was held in 1862 for six girls and one boy.

In 1863, Isaac M. Wise, a founder of Reform Judaism in America, came to Pittsburgh. He had a great impact, and shortly after his visit, the congregation voted to adopt some Reform practices, including the Reform prayer book. The change didn't suit all Rodef Shalom congregants, with some resigning and forming the Orthodox, later Conservative, Tree of Life Synagogue.

The transition to full Reform practices came in stages. As the years passed, services were shortened, women and men sat together, and an organ was installed—music was vital to Rodef Shalom even then, as the choir, directed by Bertha (Mrs. Jacob) Benswanger, was reputed to be “one of the best in the country.”

The transition to the English language took time. When Louis Naumburg became minister in 1865, he spoke in German. Lippman Mayer, who succeeded him in 1870, spoke English but was more comfortable in German. Mayer, a strong proponent of Reform, later founded the Jewish Chautauqua Society. The changes didn't stop with language: By 1874, it was no longer mandatory for men to wear a hat or yarmulke and the congregation had joined the Union of American Hebrew Congregations.

Major changes for Rodef Shalom occurred in 1885. The congregation hosted a national convention rabbis, organized by Reform leadership. The resulting "Pittsburgh Platform" declared that Judaism was a religion, not a nation, and that the Bible was an ethical guide, not the infallible word of God. It stated that American Jews do not have to keep kosher. This Pittsburgh Platform guided North American Reform Judaism until 1937, and caused a major split in American Jewry between liberal and traditional groups.

=== 20th century ===
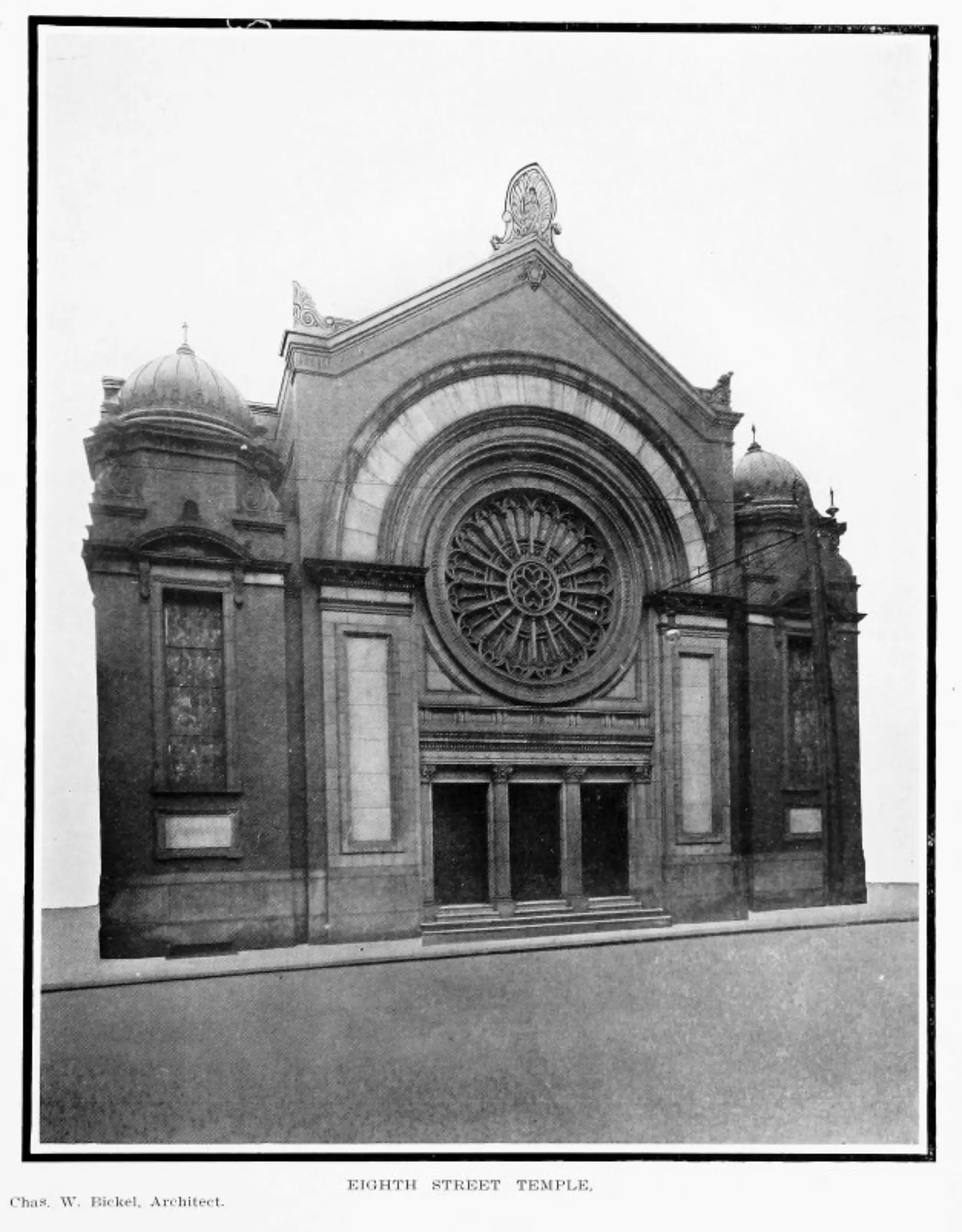
The 1901 temple on Eighth Street in downtown Pittsburgh (architect Charles Bickel)

J. Leonard Levy, a dynamic leader with an internationalist outlook, became Rodef Shalom's Rabbi in 1901. He had served congregations in Bristol, England; Sacramento, California; and Philadelphia. Rabbi Levy was known for his work to strengthen interfaith communication in Pittsburgh and beyond. During his Pittsburgh tenure, he started an international peace organization and co-edited the weekly Jewish Criterion, in addition to preaching at both Sabbath and Sunday services at Rodef Shalom.

At Levy's invitation, President William Howard Taft visited Rodef Shalom on Saturday, May 29, 1909. This was the first recorded time that a sitting United States president spoke in a synagogue.

During Levy's rabbinate, Rodef Shalom nearly tripled, growing from 132 member families at his start to 363 by 1908. Pittsburgh was changing. New immigration patterns brought more Jews to the city and new demographic patterns saw many of these new arrivals and longer-standing congregants moving from Allegheny City and the Hill District to emerging eastern neighborhoods like Oakland, Shadyside, and East Liberty. Nevertheless, more than half of Rodef Shalom's members still lived near the Allegheny City Temple, so when a move was suggested due to crowded conditions, the congregation opted to expand where it stood. The original Temple building was torn down in 1900, replaced by a Charles Bickel-designed edifice. The new, larger structure was dedicated on September 6 and 7, 1901. Shortly thereafter, an annex was added for religious school classes. By 1904, however, the congregation had already outgrown the space.

Congregational leaders came to see Oakland, Shadyside, and Squirrel Hill as the new cultural and residential centers of Pittsburgh. Rodef Shalom sold its new-but-outdated home to the Second Presbyterian Church, their downtown neighbor, for $150,000 and began its move toward the east, buying a lot near the corner of Morewood and Fifth avenues for $60,000. (See Architecture.)

Samuel H. Goldenson came to Rodef Shalom in 1918, a year after Rabbi Levy's untimely death. He instituted further reform practices, persuading members to give up their privately owned pews in favor of a more democratic system of unassigned seats, a decision that attracted many more members.

Solomon B. Freehof replaced Goldenson when he left for New York's Congregation Emanu-El in 1934. He provided regular preaching, and also wrote extensively on Jewish law and ritual. Freehof chaired the group that updated the Union Prayer Book. He wrote book reviews for over 35 years, with a readership of more than 1,500 Christians and Jews. He was president of the Central Conference of American Rabbis and the World Union for Progressive Judaism. His wife Lillian wrote plays and novels and organized Braille services.

The Religious School added the Levy Hall auditorium (designed by Ingham & Boyd), and the Cohen Chapel, completed in 1938. A large social hall, named in honor of Dr. Freehof, was built in 1956, and an addition to the back of the building provided an entrance from the parking lot, funded by Allen H. and Selma W. Berkman. With more congregants than the Temple could serve, Rodef Shalom encouraged the creation of new Reform congregations, helping shepherd Temple Sinai in Squirrel Hill, Temple Emanuel in the South Hills, and Temple David in Monroeville into existence.

Freehod retired in 1966, and was succeeded by his assistant, Dr. Walter Jacob, originally hired in 1955. Membership peaked at approximately 2,300 families in the early 1960s. Jacob founded the Freehof Institute of Progressive Halakhah and was president of the Central Conference of American Rabbis. He and his wife Irene established the Biblical Botanical Garden at Rodef Shalom in 1986. Now As Rabbi Emeritus of Rodef Shalom, Dr. Jacob remained active in Pittsburgh and abroad. He was instrumental in the creation of Abraham Geiger College, the first rabbinic training college in Germany since the Holocaust.

=== 21st century ===
Dr. Mark Staitman, associate rabbi since 1975, served as Rabbi of the Congregation from 1997–2003. Dr. Staitman is known for his involvement with Soviet Jewry and served as Chairman of the National Coalition Supporting Soviet Jewry.

Following Dr. Staitman's retirement, Rabbi Aaron Bisno became the senior rabbi of Rodef Shalom. Rabbi Bisno was removed from his position in 2022 following what the congregation's board said were "personnel allegations” and “workplace culture concerns.”

Rabbi Sharon Henry, who joined the congregation in 1999, became the senior Rabbi in 2022 until her retirement in 2025.

In 1989-1990 a major capital campaign restored the sanctuary. In 2000–2003, other areas of the building were updated for contemporary usage and handicap accessibility and a new porte-cochere entrance from the parking lot was added.

On October 30, 2018 Rodef Shalom hosted the memorial service for Cecil and David Rosenthal, victims of the Tree of Life Synagogue shooting that had occurred three days earlier. Among the attendees were members of the Pittsburgh Steelers.

In December 2023 it was announced that Rodef Shalom and Temple Sinai, on Forbes Avenue, having split eighty years earlier, were beginning plans to form closer collaboration. On June 8, 2025 both Rodef Shalom and Temple Sinai, approved a plan to unify as a new congregation at Rodef Shalom's current building.

== Architecture ==
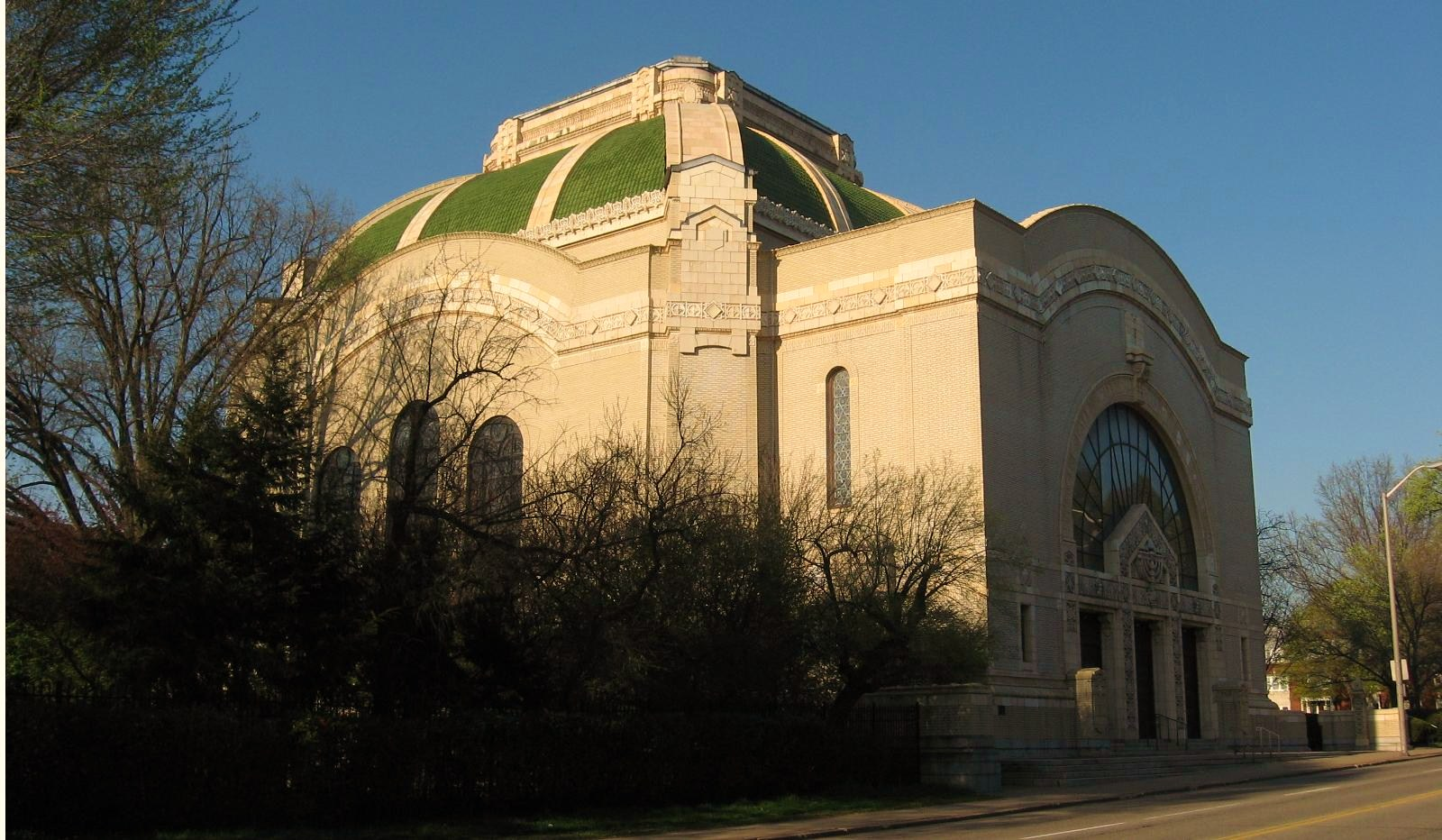
Rodef Shalom Congregation from Fifth Avenue

A design competition was held and Henry Hornbostel — the architect Andrew Carnegie selected to create Carnegie Institute of Technology (now Carnegie Mellon University)—emerged the winner. Hornbostel's Beaux Arts styling merged the traditional with the modern. The double dome, 90 feet (27 m) in diameter, was constructed without structural steel, instead using the Catalan vault, a Spanish vernacular style brought to the U.S. by Rafael Guastavino.

For the exterior, Hornbostel chose local yellow brick, augmented with colored terra cotta flourishes. The design incorporated four representational stained glass windows by William Willet, saved from the 1901 building, along with a large stained glass skylight in the dome and a lunette over the Fifth Avenue entrance. They installed a 1907 Kimball organ, the largest of its kind still in use. It seats more than 900 on the first floor and 300 in the gallery. The building was finished in time for High Holy Day services in 1907 at a cost of $250,000.

== Notable members ==
- Edgar J. Kaufmann, businessman and philanthropist who owned Kaufmann's Department Store and commissioned Fallingwater and Kaufmann Desert House
- Jonas Salk, virologist and medical researcher who developed one of the first successful polio vaccines
