= Jonathan Wolken =

Abraham Jonathan Wolken (July 12, 1949 – June 13, 2010) was one of the original dancers and a co-founder of Pilobolus dance company in 1971, which The New York Times in his obituary calls "one of the most popular modern-dance companies in the world". Wolken served as one of the company's four original artistic directors.

Wolken was born on July 12, 1949, in Pittsburgh, Pennsylvania, son of biophysicist Jerome Wolken. He attended Dartmouth College, where he earned a bachelor's degree in Philosophy (1971). While attending Dartmouth, he took a modern dance class taught by Alison Becker Chase. Together with Moses Pendleton, a fellow student in the Dartmouth dance class, Robby Barnett, and Lee Harris, Wolken formed the Pilobolus dance company, which was named for a fungus that shoots its spores as much as several feet away, having seen a demonstration from his father during his youth. Chase and Martha Clarke joined the group in 1973; and Michael Tracy was added the following year, replacing Lee Harris. Clarke left the group in 1978 and Pendleton in 1983, each going off to form dance companies of their own.

With almost no practical experience in dance, the group developed its own unique visual slapstick style. A review by dance critic Anna Kisselgoff of The Times in 1971 said the troupe's enthusiasm "suggest an interest in dance that can only be applauded", noting their "amazing physical fearlessness, humor, inventiveness and unselfconsciousness", creating "witty and theatrical shapes" and "kinetic gags" using their body movements and groupings. This early performance evidenced the Pilobolus style that would last for decades that used the movements of the human body and interlinkings between members to create a form of kinetic art.

Wolken ended his dance career several years after the troupe was formed but continued to choreograph performances including "Pseudopodia" (1973), "B'zyrk" (2007), and "Razor: Mirror" (2008). His final production, "Hitched", began performances in summer 2010 during the company's annual month-long series at the Joyce Theater in New York City and were dedicated to his memory. Wolken choreographed a production of A Selection in conjunction with its author Maurice Sendak that was the subject of a 2002 documentary by Mirra Bank.

A resident of Washington, Connecticut, Wolken died in Manhattan's Mount Sinai Hospital at age 60 on June 13, 2010, from complications of stem cell treatments for his myelofibrosis.
