= St. Andrew's Episcopal Church (Washington, Connecticut) =

Historic church in Connecticut, United States

- U.S. National Register of Historic Places
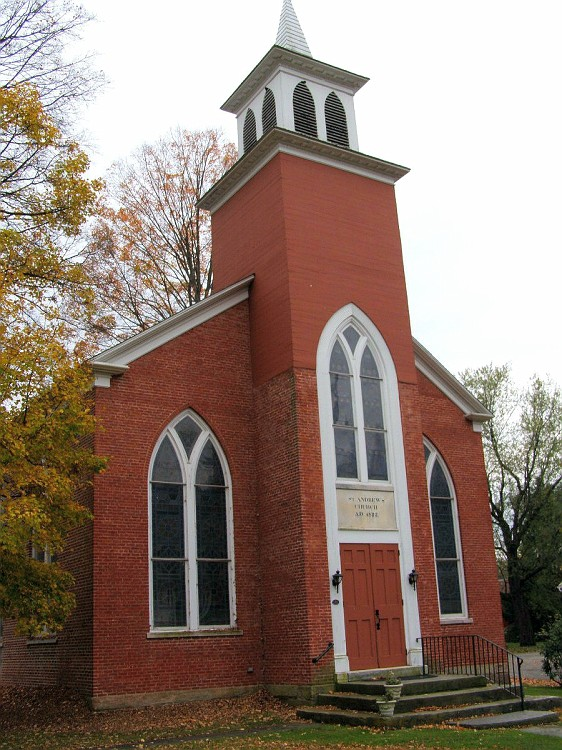

- Location within Connecticut Location within the United States
- Location: 247 New Milford Turnpike, Washington, Connecticut
- Coordinates: 41°39′46″N 73°22′10″W
- Area: 0.3 acres (0.12 ha)
- Built: 1822
- Architect: Wheaton, The Rev. Nathaniel
- Architectural style: Gothic Revival
- NRHP reference No.: 94001443
- Added to NRHP: December 9, 1994

St. Andrew's is a historic Episcopal church at 247 New Milford Turnpike (U.S. Route 202), in the Marbledale village of Washington, Litchfield County, Connecticut. Built in 1822, it is believed to be one of the first Gothic Revival style churches to be built in rural Connecticut. It was listed on the National Register of Historic Places in 1994.

== Description and history ==
St. Andrew's is located on the south side of New Milford Turnpike at its junction with Wheaton Road. It is a brick structure with a projecting square tower whose upper stages are finished in wood, and slightly projecting transepts. It has Gothic-style lancet windows with marble sills and wood frames. A 20th-century brick addition to the rear provides office and meeting spaces, and a kitchen.

The St. Andrew's Episcopalian congregation was established in 1764 in New Preston. The largely Loyalist congregation was harassed during the American Revolutionary War, and abandoned its original building, meeting in private homes. Formed anew in 1791, the congregation rented and then purchased a local Quaker meeting house, which served as its home until 1816. The present edifice was begun in 1821 and completed in 1823. The church was enlarged in 1855, mainly through the efforts of Dr. Nathaniel Wheaton, one of the founders of Trinity College who may have been born here. The only earlier known example of Gothic Revival architecture in Connecticut is the 1814 Trinity Church on the Green in New Haven, designed by Ithiel Town.

== See also ==
- National Register of Historic Places listings in Litchfield County, Connecticut
