= New Preston, Connecticut =

Census-designated place in Connecticut, United States

- Census-designated place
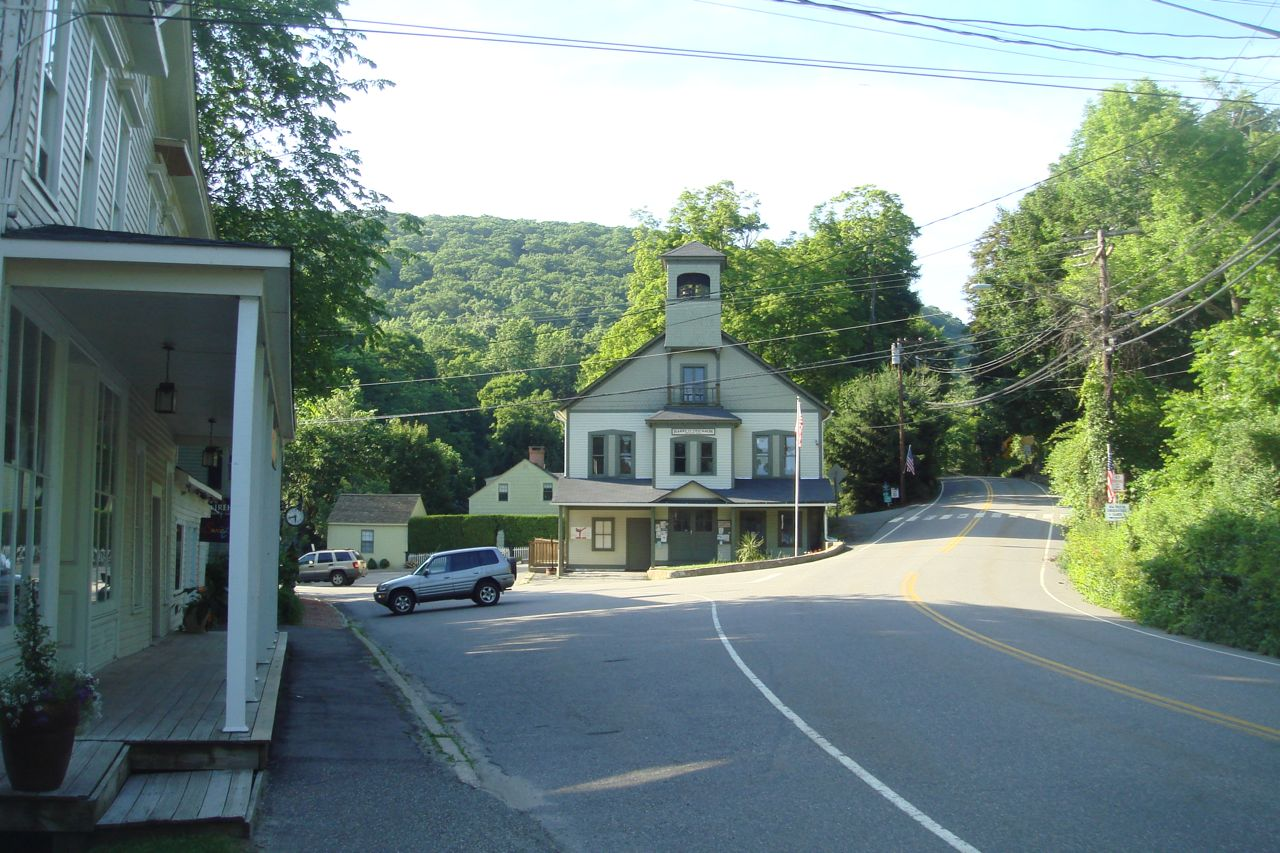
- Northerly view from Route 45/East Shore Road

- Location in Litchfield County, Connecticut
- Coordinates: 41°40′28″N 73°21′16″W
- State: Connecticut
- County: Litchfield
- Town: Washington

Area
  - Total: 7.8 sq mi (20.3 km^{2})
  - Land: 7.3 sq mi (19.0 km^{2})
  - Water: 0.50 sq mi (1.3 km^{2})
- Elevation: 606 ft (185 m)

Population (2010)
  - Total: 1,182
  - Density: 162/sq mi (62.4/km^{2})
- ZIP Code: 06777
- FIPS code: 09-52770
- GNIS feature ID: 209251

New Preston is a rural village and census-designated place (CDP) in the northwestern corner of the town of Washington, Litchfield County, Connecticut, United States. As of the 2020 census, New Preston had a population of 1,126.

New Preston Village Center

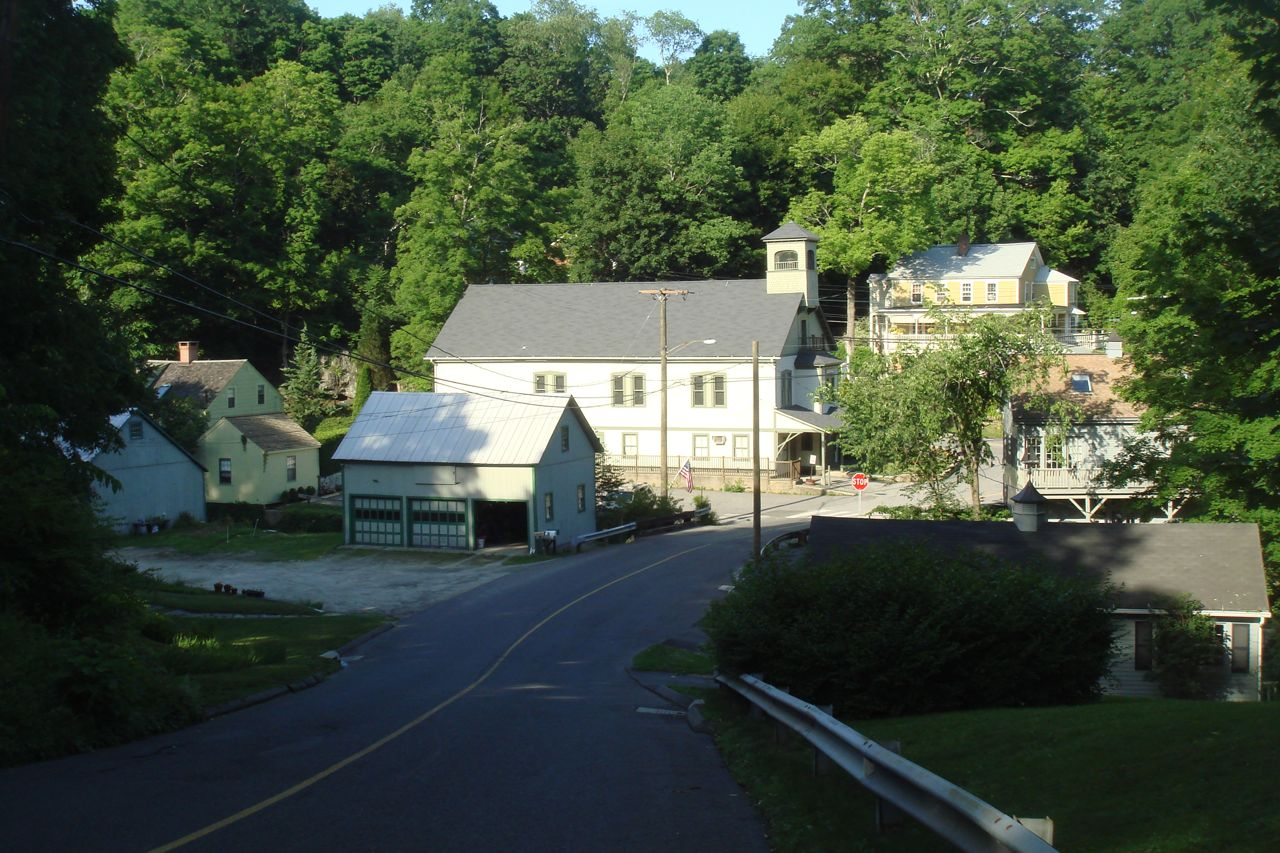
Easterly view from New Preston Hill Road

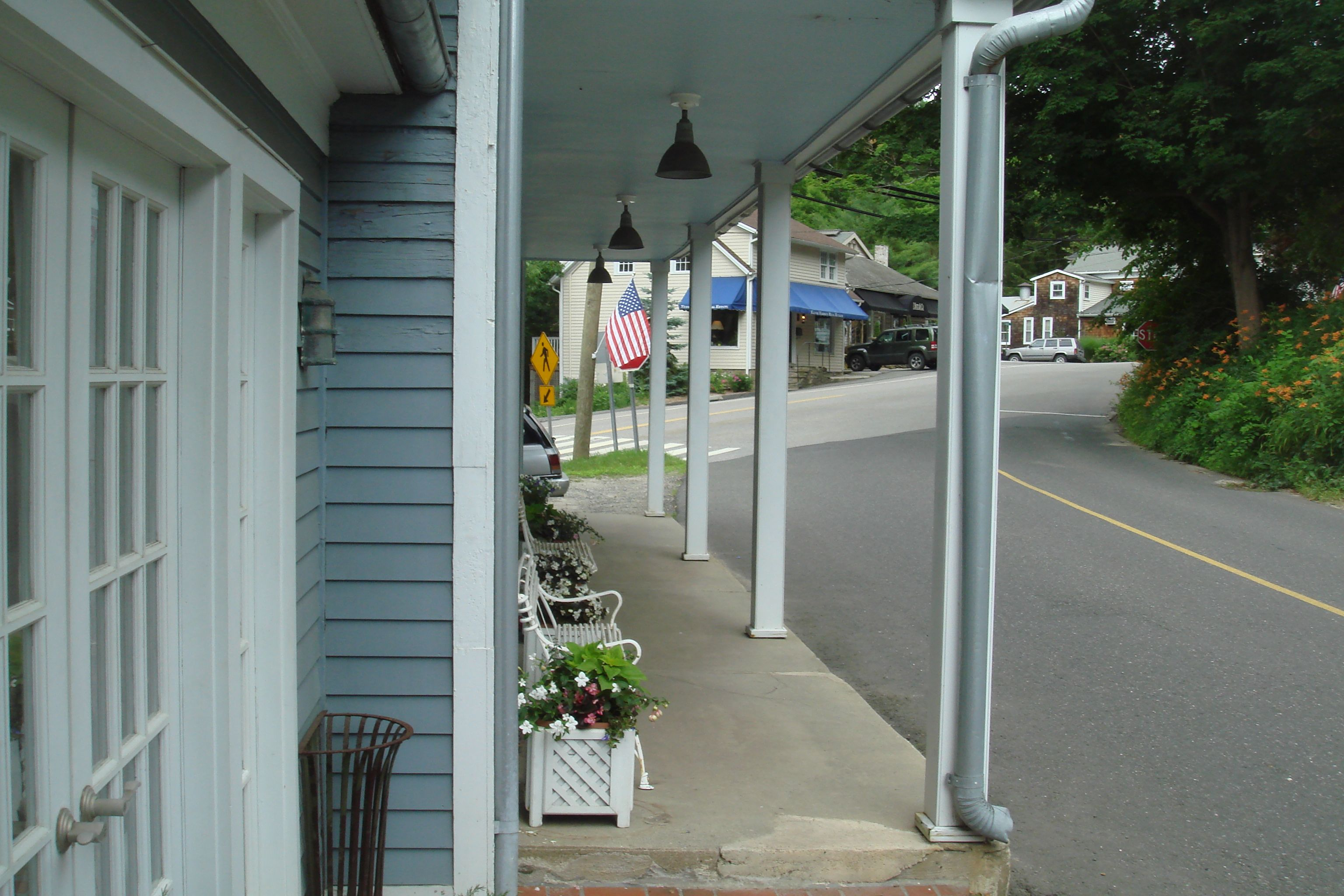
Northwesterly view from Main Street

== Geography ==
The New Preston CDP includes the entire northwestern quadrant of the town of Washington, including the villages of New Preston and Marbledale, as well as 1,195-foot (364 m) Mount Bushnell and Meeker Swamp. The CDP has a total area of 7.8 square miles (20.3 km^{2}), of which 7.3 square miles (19.0 km^{2}) are land and 0.50 square miles (1.3 km^{2}), or 6.47%, are water. The dominant geographic feature of New Preston is Lake Waramaug, which is situated just north of the New Preston village center and is the headwaters of the East Aspetuck River, which runs through the village center and over New Preston Falls. The terrain is characterized by steep hills and narrow valleys, with a preponderance of talus slopes and ledge rock.

== Demographics ==
=== 2020 census ===
As of the 2020 census, New Preston had a population of 1,126. The median age was 53.5 years. 16.5% of residents were under the age of 18 and 28.5% of residents were 65 years of age or older. For every 100 females there were 97.5 males, and for every 100 females age 18 and over there were 98.7 males age 18 and over.

1.5% of residents lived in urban areas, while 98.5% lived in rural areas.

There were 495 households in New Preston, of which 20.2% had children under the age of 18 living in them. Of all households, 49.9% were married-couple households, 19.4% were households with a male householder and no spouse or partner present, and 25.7% were households with a female householder and no spouse or partner present. About 32.3% of all households were made up of individuals and 17.8% had someone living alone who was 65 years of age or older.

There were 661 housing units, of which 25.1% were vacant. The homeowner vacancy rate was 0.2% and the rental vacancy rate was 8.0%.

Racial composition as of the 2020 census
Race	Number	Percent
White	985	87.5%
Black or African American	7	0.6%
American Indian and Alaska Native	5	0.4%
Asian	15	1.3%
Native Hawaiian and Other Pacific Islander	0	0.0%
Some other race	49	4.4%
Two or more races	65	5.8%
Hispanic or Latino (of any race)	88	7.8%

=== 2000 census ===
As of the census of 2000, there were 1,110 people, 439 households, and 303 families residing in the CDP. The population density was 150.1 inhabitants per square mile (58.0/km^{2}). There were 563 housing units at an average density of 76.1 per square mile (29.4/km^{2}). The racial makeup of the CDP was 97.84% White, 0.36% African American, 0.09% Native American, 0.18% Asian, 0.27% from other races, and 1.26% from two or more races. Hispanic or Latino of any race were 1.17% of the population.

There were 439 households, out of which 30.3% had children under the age of 18 living with them, 60.6% were married couples living together, 5.9% had a female householder with no husband present, and 30.8% were non-families. 26.2% of all households were made up of individuals, and 11.6% had someone living alone who was 65 years of age or older. The average household size was 2.49 and the average family size was 3.00.

In the CDP, the population was spread out, with 23.4% under the age of 18, 5.3% from 18 to 24, 26.6% from 25 to 44, 27.7% from 45 to 64, and 17.0% who were 65 years of age or older. The median age was 42 years. For every 100 females, there were 102.2 males. For every 100 females age 18 and over, there were 95.9 males.

The median income for a household in the CDP was $55,962, and the median income for a family was $69,000. Males had a median income of $45,673 versus $28,333 for females. The per capita income for the CDP was $36,566. About 3.4% of families and 3.9% of the population were below the poverty line, including none of those under age 18 and 19.9% of those age 65 or over.

Many of New Preston's inhabitants are part-time residents who principally reside in New York City, so census data may not accurately reflect the population's actual demography.

== Transportation ==
The two main roads in New Preston are U.S. Route 202 and Connecticut Route 45. US 202 leads northeast 11 miles (18 km) to Litchfield and southwest 7 miles (11 km) to New Milford, while Route 45 leads north 5 miles (8 km) to Warren. There is no public transportation.

Historic Architecture of New Preston

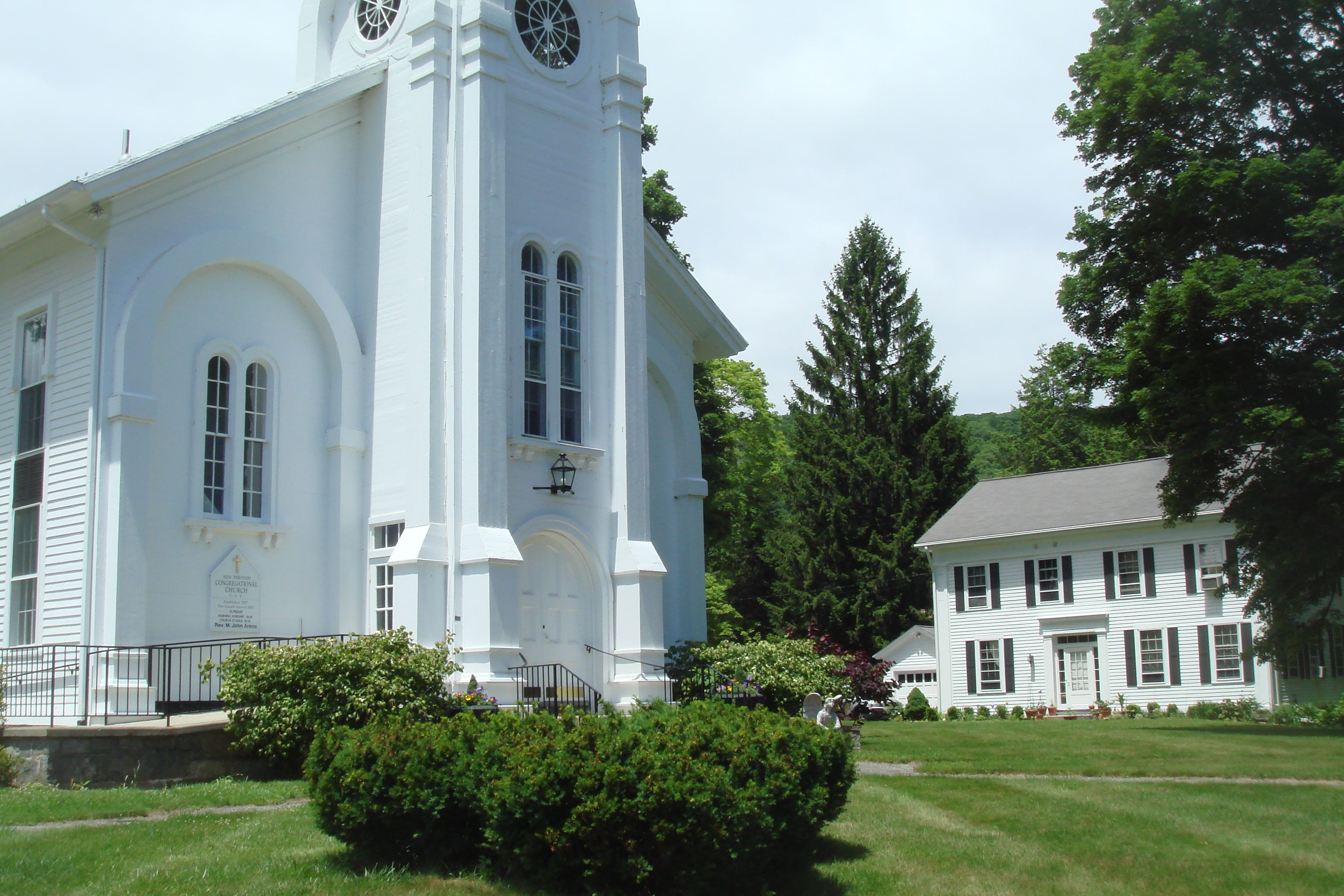
New Preston Congregational Church

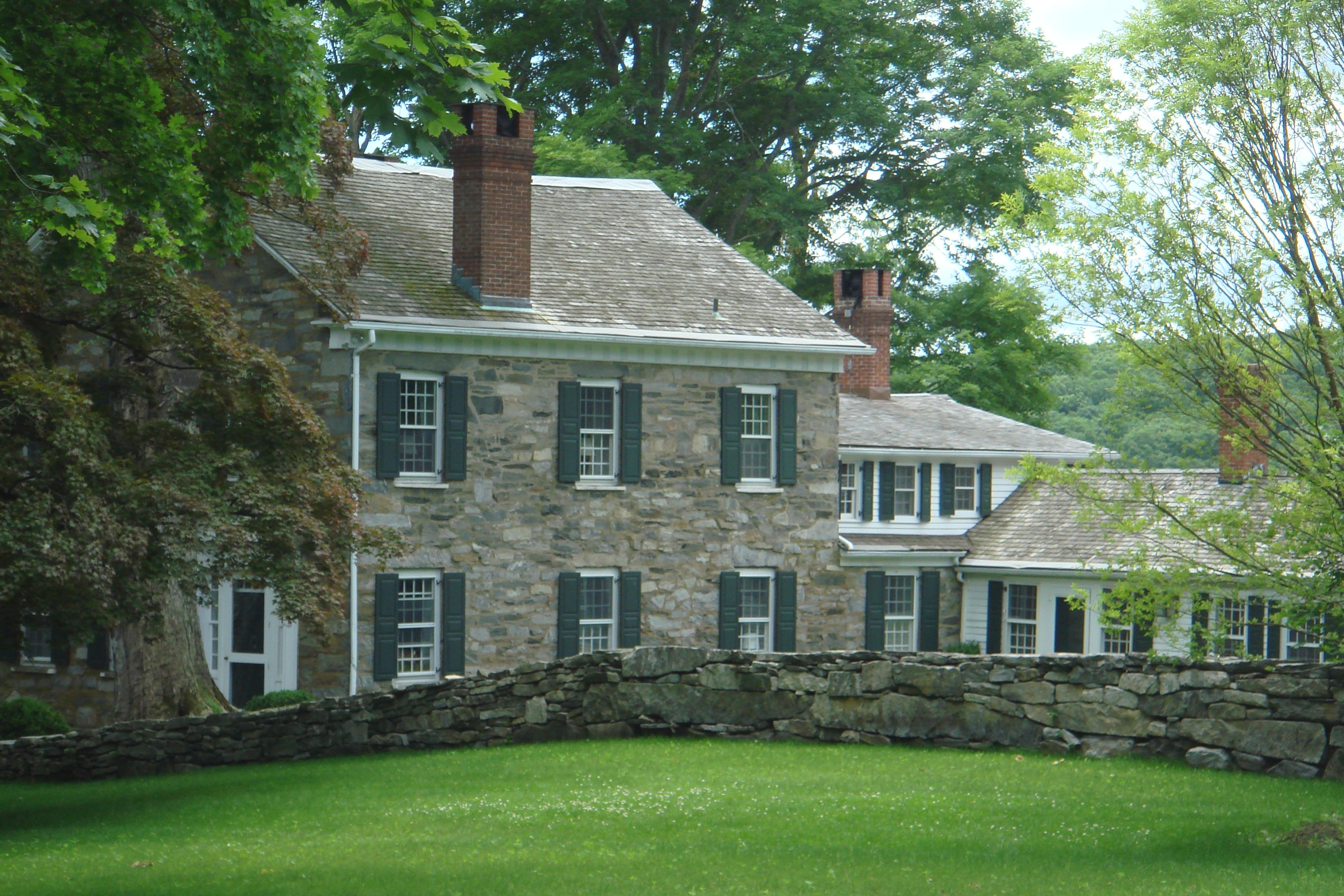
Former residence of Bill Blass, atop New Preston Hill

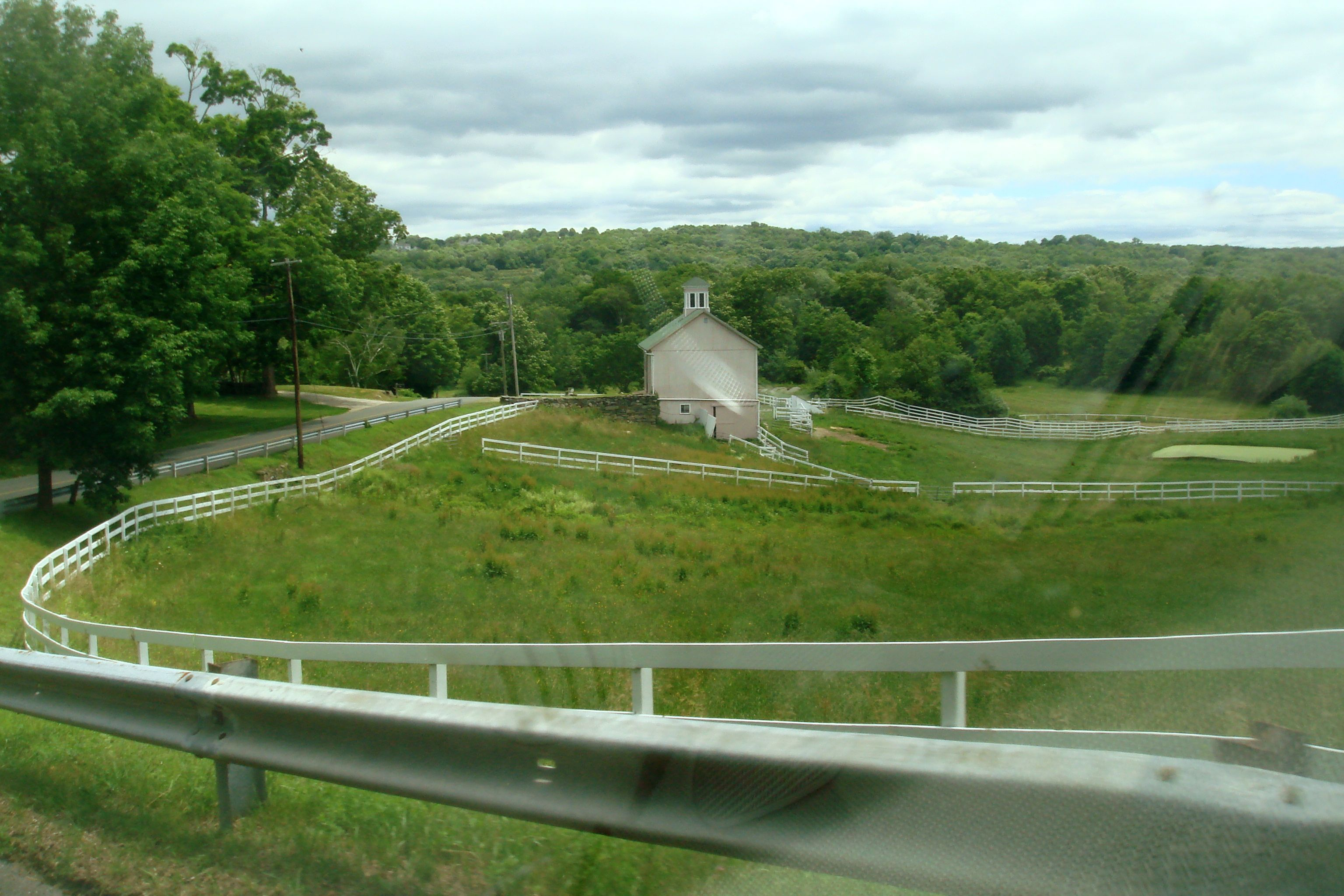
A barn on New Preston Hill

== History ==
=== Pre-colonial ===
Archeological evidence suggests that Native Americans first settled in the area around 10,000 years ago, following the retreat of the glaciers at the conclusion of the last ice age. What is now known as New Preston came to be inhabited by the Wyantenock tribe of Native Americans, who spent summers at Lake Waramaug, establishing a pattern of seasonal residence that is widely repeated by New Preston's present-day occupants.

=== Colonial ===
The signature of Chief Waramaug, who led the Wyantenock tribe in the early 18th century, appears on several local colonial-era property records, including the "New Milford North Purchase", which encompassed a substantial swath of southern Litchfield County, including contemporary New Preston. Colonists settled New Preston in 1741, and the General Assembly of the Connecticut Colony granted a petition for the establishment of the New Preston Ecclesiastical Society in 1753. In April 1778 the 270 families living in the area petitioned the General Assembly to be incorporated as a town. The petition was granted in January of the following year, incorporating the Town of Washington from the parishes of Judea and New Preston and taking from the towns of Woodbury, Litchfield, Kent, and New Milford. The action marked the first establishment of a municipality in Connecticut after the Declaration of Independence was signed. The town was named after George Washington, who, in his capacity as Commander of the Continental Army during the American Revolution, passed through the area several times. In May 1781, George Washington slept in New Preston at the Cogswell Tavern, which still stands on present-day Christian Street and is used as a private residence.

=== 19th century ===
In the early decades of the 19th century (the era of the Industrial Revolution), numerous mills and modestly scaled factories were constructed along the East Aspetuck River, which drops precipitously between its source at Lake Waramaug and the New Preston village center, providing a robust source of water power. New Preston housed an iron works, as well as manufacturers of twine, hats, cheese boxes, ax handles, shoes, and harnesses. However, with the advent of electricity, expansion of national rail networks, and the rise of larger, more accessible manufacturing centers during the latter part of the 19th century, industrial activity in New Preston decreased, eventually disappearing altogether.

In the latter decades of the 19th century, New Preston began its transformation to a summer colony. With the arrival of the Shepaug Railroad in 1872, passenger service was introduced between New Preston Station and New York City, which gave rise to the construction of summer homes and inns around the perimeter of Lake Waramaug.

=== 20th century ===
The railroad ceased operation in 1948, and many of the large inns on the lake closed, giving way to single-family residences used primarily as vacation homes.

By the 1970s, much of New Preston's diminutive village center had fallen into decline, with many shops left vacant and in various states of disrepair. Several buildings and locations in New Preston were used in the filming of the 1981 horror movie Friday the 13th, Part 2.

In the mid-1980s, a transformation of the village center began with the opening of a store specializing in antique gardening books and horticultural prints. Antique shops and other upscale retail establishments soon followed, and many of New Preston's historic commercial structures underwent renovation. The village's only grocery store, pharmacy, and gas station closed, leaving New Preston largely devoid of essential services.

By the mid-1990s, the village center had been completely made over into a picturesque, high-end retail destination catering primarily to weekend residents and out-of-town visitors.

=== Contemporary ===
During the booming economy of the late 1990s and early first decade of the 21st century, the gentrification of New Preston shifted into high gear. Modest lake cottages around Lake Waramaug were torn down and replaced with larger, more luxurious homes, and other lake houses underwent substantial renovation and expansion. Two of the four remaining inns on the lake—The Inn at Lake Waramaug and The Birches Inn—were converted into lavish single-family residences.

== Architecture ==
New Preston is known for its traditional rural New England architecture, which includes many well-preserved 18th and 19th century homes built in the Georgian, Greek Revival, Italianate, and Shingle styles, as well as several 19th-century mill structures along the East Aspetuck River. Antique barns and other agricultural outbuildings are also widely prevalent.

Because New Preston's steep, rocky terrain presents significant constraints to development, most viable development sites were utilized prior to 1900, making contemporary construction of new homes and businesses rare. As a consequence, New Preston exhibits a high degree of architectural and aesthetic cohesion. When new construction does occur, it generally follows—or attempts to follow—the historic vernacular. Portions of New Preston Hill Road and Findlay Road, three quarters of a mile west of the village center, are included in the New Preston Hill Historic District, which was listed on the National Register of Historic Places in 1985. The more prominent buildings in that district include Hill Congregational Church, the Rev. Samuel Whittlesey House (1808), and the John Ferris House (1800).

== Open space ==
A substantial portion of the land in and around New Preston is permanently protected open space, which consists of state parks, local land trust holdings, and privately owned parcels under conservation easement. Public open space areas include the Macricostas Preserve, Mount Bushnell State Park, and a 31-acre (130,000 m^{2}) parcel adjacent to the New Preston village center, which the town of Washington purchased in 2010 with money from its open space fund.

== Scenic roads ==
In 1996, the Connecticut Department of Transportation designated the 6.9 miles (11.1 km) of perimeter roads around Lake Waramaug as state scenic roads, affording them a legal status that discourages maintenance or improvements that would detract from the roads' scenic qualities. In 2010, New Preston's main commercial thoroughfare, East Shore Road (also known as Connecticut Route 45), was designated a state scenic road, together with a 2.8-mile (4.5 km) portion of Route 202 extending northeast from the junction with Route 45 to Rabbit Hill Road.

The town of Washington has also given municipal scenic road designations in New Preston to Rabbit Hill Road, Couch Road, Gunn Hill Road, and Whittlesey Road.

== Postal addresses, municipalities, and nomenclature ==
Although the village of New Preston and the New Preston CDP are entirely within the town of Washington, U.S. Postal Service addressing practices result in the name being applied to the Marble Dale section of Washington, and to portions of the adjacent town of Warren. While New Preston village once had its own post office, it is now served by a combined New Preston-Marble Dale post office, which is located in Marble Dale, and also serves the southern portion of Warren. Further confusing matters, there are three separate post offices in the town of Washington, each with a unique ZIP code: Washington (06793), Washington Depot (06794), and New Preston-Marble Dale (06777).

== Education ==
It is in the Regional School District 12.

== Notable people ==
Many high-profile New York City residents and expatriates maintain homes in New Preston. Current inhabitants of note include Graydon Carter, the editor of the magazine Vanity Fair, actress Christine Baranski, and bandleader Peter Duchin. Past notable residents include the fashion designer Bill Blass, comedian Joan Rivers, and theologian Horace Bushnell.

Former US Congressman Frederick Whittlesey was born here. Psychiatrist and writer, M. Scott Peck lived here in 1979.
