= Astad Deboo =

Indian dancer and choreographer (1947–2020)

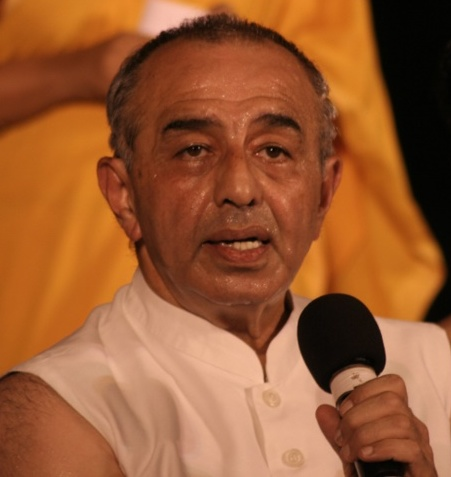
- Deboo in 2009
- Born: 13 July 1947; Navsari, Gujarat, British India
- Died: 10 December 2020 (aged 73); Mumbai, India
- Dancing career
- Dances: Contemporary dance – fusion of Kathak and Kathakali

Astad Deboo (13 July 1947 – 10 December 2020) was an Indian contemporary dancer and choreographer. He was considered a pioneer of modern dance in India. Through his career he collaborated with artists including Pina Bausch, Alison Becker Chase and Pink Floyd, and performed across the world.

He was awarded the Sangeet Natak Akademi Award in 1995 and Padma Shri in 2007, awarded by the Government of India.

== Early life ==
Deboo was born on 13 July 1947 into a Parsi family in Navsari, in the Indian state of Gujarat. He grew up in Kolkata till the age of six after which his family shifted to Jamshedpur, where his father was employed with Tata Steel. His mother was a homemaker, and he had two sisters, Kamal and Gulshan.

At the age of six, he started learning the Kathak dance form, from the late Indra Kumar Mohanty and the late Prahlad Das. He studied at Loyola School, Jamshedpur, from where he passed out in 1964, after which he moved to Mumbai and joined a bachelor's course in commerce at Podar College, University of Mumbai.

== Dance career ==
While pursuing his degree in Mumbai (then Bombay), he happened to see the contemporary dance of the American Murray Louis Dance Company, which left him inspired. Shortly afterwards, artist Uttara Asha Coorlawala who was studying dance in New York, visited Bombay, and helped him join Martha Graham Center of Contemporary Dance in New York. Deboo left Bombay in 1969, on board a cargo boat that set sail from Bombay port, and later hitchhiked his way through Europe to eventually reach New York in 1974.

Over the next decade, he went on to attend the London School of Contemporary Dance where he learnt Martha Graham's modern dance technique and thereafter went on to learn José Limón's technique in New York. He also trained with Pina Bausch in the Wuppertal Dance Company, Germany and with Alison Becker Chase of the Pilobolus Dance Company, and travelled through Europe, Americas, Japan and Indonesia. On his return in 1977, he studied Kathakali, under Guru E. Krishna Panikar, in Thiruvalla, Kerala, where he eventually performed at the famous Guruvayur Temple. All these explorations led to the creation of a dance style unique to him, an amalgamation of Indian classical dance and western group dance techniques.

A turning point in his career came in 1986, when Pierre Cardin commissioned him to choreograph for Maya Plisetskaya, the prima ballerina of the Bolshoi Theater ballet company. Over the years he collaborated with Pink Floyd at the Chelsea Town Hall in London, the Gundecha Brothers, Pina Bausch of the Wuppertal Dance Company, Germany, and the Thang-Ta – the martial art and Pung cholom dancers of Manipur. He worked for several years with Tim McCarthy at Gallaudet University in Washington for the deaf performing arts program, and the production "Road Signs" toured India in 1995, with a troupe drawn from Gallaudet and Deboo's Indian students.

In January 2005, he along with a troupe of 12 young women with hearing impairment, from the Clarke School for the Deaf, Chennai, and part of the Deboos Astad Deboo Dance Foundation, performed at the 20th Annual Deaf Olympics, at Melbourne, Australia. He choreographed the 2004 Hindi film by painter M. F. Husain, Meenaxi: A Tale of Three Cities. In 2009, he performed his production, 'Breaking Boundaries' with fourteen street children from the NGO Salaam Baalak Trust. These children had trained with his troupe for six months. In 2019, he collaborated with Hema Rajagopalan, Sikkil Gurucharan and George Brooks to perform "INAI" with the Natya Dance Theatre in Chicago.

== Death ==
He died in Mumbai aged 73 on 10th Dec 2020, a month after being diagnosed with non-Hodgkins lymphoma.

== Awards ==
- 1995: Sangeet Natak Akademi Award
- 2007: Padma Shri

== See also ==
- List of dancers
