= Jerome Wolken =

American biophysicist (1917–1999)

Jerome Jay Wolken
- Born: March 28, 1917; Pittsburgh, Pennsylvania
- Died: May 10, 1999 (aged 82); Pittsburgh, Pennsylvania
- Resting place: Tiphereth Israel Cemetery, Allegheny County, Pennsylvania
- Education: University of Pittsburgh; Bachelor of Science in Chemistry, 1946; Master's in Biological Sciences, 1948; Doctor of Philosophy in Biophysics, 1949
- Known for: Development of the Light Concentrating Lens System (U.S. patent 4,669,832; June 2, 1987), which enabled some blind people to see.

Jerome Jay Wolken (March 28, 1917 – May 10, 1999) was an American biophysicist who used his research in vision in deep sea creatures to develop a kind of eyeglasses that used specially designed lenses to gather more light, which provided vision to some people who were legally blind.

== Early life and education ==
Jerome Jay Wolken was born in Pittsburgh on March 28, 1917. He earned a series of degrees from the University of Pittsburgh, a bachelor's degree in chemistry in 1946, a master's degree in biological sciences in 1948 and a Ph.D. in biophysics in 1949.

== Career ==
He taught at his alma mater after his graduation and was named a professor of biophysics physiology in 1962. As head of the Biophysical research laboratory at the University of Pittsburgh, Wolken received a project from NASA to develop a rocket-borne detector that could be used to search for signs of extraterrestrial life using microspectrophotometry with a series of focusing lenses that Wolken had developed. As part of his research, he proposed sending cockroaches into space, to take advantage of their eye nerves and their ability to see in the dark light waves that are invisible to human eyes.

In 1964, he was named to the faculty of Carnegie Mellon University, where he was head of the biology department at Margaret Morrison Carnegie College. In 1965, Wolken was awarded a $50,000 grant from the Rachel Mellon Walton Foundation to create new and improved laboratory space for his work at the Carnegie Institute of Technology. In studies he conducted at Marine Biological Laboratory, the Woods Hole Oceanographic Institution and other facilities around the world, Wolken did extensive research on deep sea animals, investigating the way that their lenses were constructed to allow them to see in the near-complete darkness in waters up to 1,500 feet (460 m) deep.

=== Lens ===
He developed the Light Concentrating Lens System in the 1980s, modeled on the lenses of the deep sea creatures he studied, earning U.S. patent 4,669,832 on June 2, 1987, for his development. The system used a set of pear-shaped lenses whose geometric relationship between the curves at the top and bottom of each lens allowed them to gather 10 times more light than standard lenses. In addition to their use in astronomy and medicine and photography, the lenses could be worn by individuals with cataracts to provide them with improved vision.

He wrote more than 100 articles for scientific journals and wrote or edited 11 books in his field. He continued his research at Carnegie Mellon after his official retirement from the university in 1982.

== Personal life ==
A resident of Pittsburgh, Wolken died at his home there at age 82 on May 10, 1999. He was survived by his second wife, their daughter Johanna Zorn and a son Erik Wolken. He was also survived by a daughter, Ann Alexandra Wolken, a Los Angeles-based artist. A son, Jonathan Wolken, founder of Pilobolus dance company, was from his first marriage, to Dorothy Mallinger Wolken, who died in 1954.
