= Washington, Connecticut =

- Town
- Town of Washington
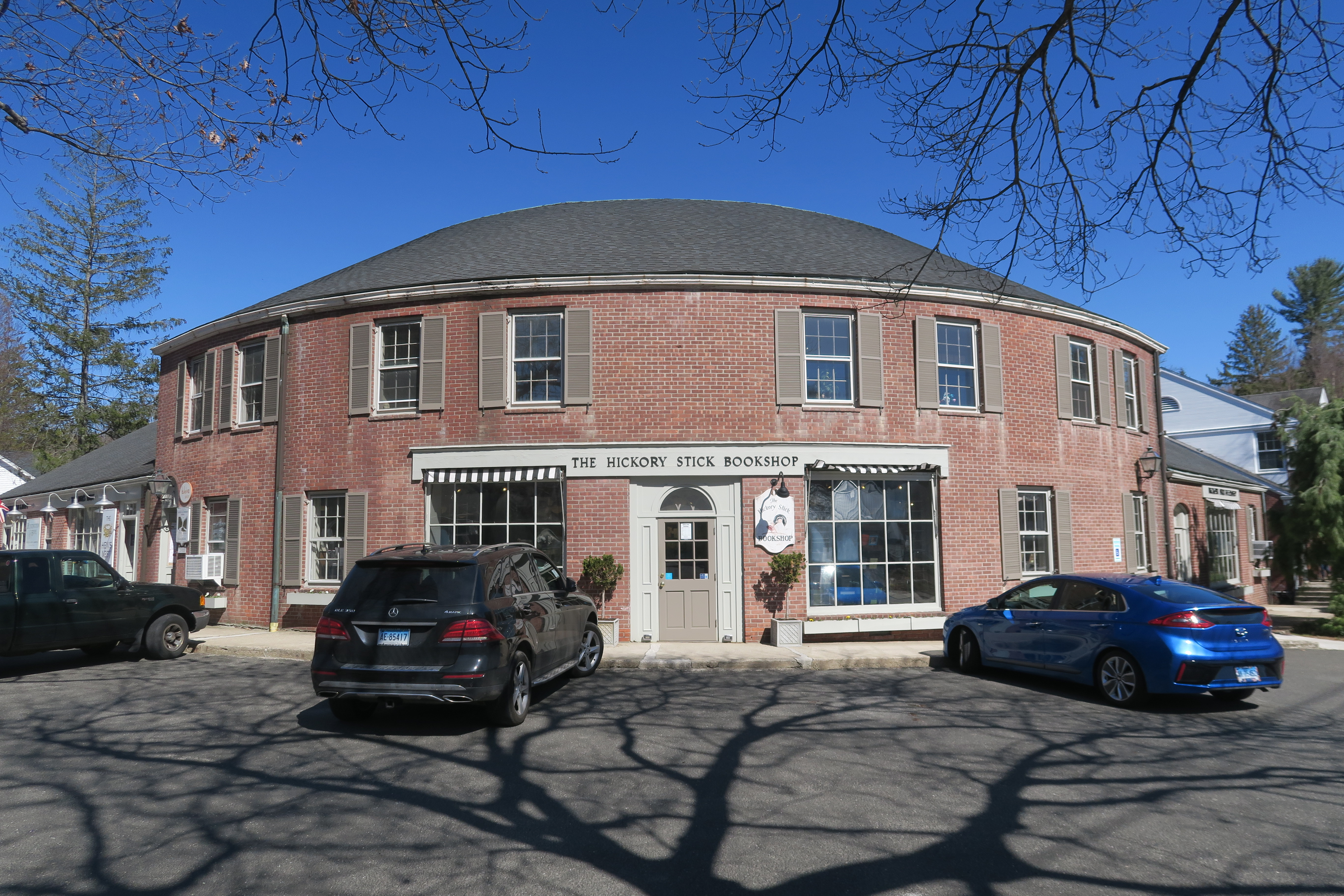
- The Hickory Stick Bookshop in Washington Depot

- Seal

- Coordinates: 41°39′12″N 73°19′06″W
- Country: United States
- U.S. state: Connecticut
- County: Litchfield
- Region: Northwest Hills
- Incorporated: 1779

Government
  - Type: Selectman-town meeting
  - First selectman: James L. Brinton (R)
  - Selectman: Dean Sarjeant (D)
  - Selectman: Jay Hubelbank (D)

Area
  - Total: 38.6 sq mi (100.1 km^{2})
  - Land: 38.1 sq mi (98.6 km^{2})
  - Water: 0.58 sq mi (1.5 km^{2})
- Elevation: 499 ft (152 m)

Population (2020)
  - Total: 3,646
  - Density: 96/sq mi (37/km^{2})
- Time zone: UTC-5 (Eastern)
  - Summer (DST): UTC-4 (Eastern)
- ZIP codes: 06777, 06793, 06794
- Area codes: 860/959
- FIPS code: 09-79720
- GNIS feature ID: 0213524
- Website: www.washingtonct.org

Washington is a rural town in Litchfield County, Connecticut, in the Northeast region of the United States. The population was 3,646 at the 2020 census. Washington is known for its picturesque countryside, historic architecture, and active civic and cultural life. The town has strong ties to New York City, and is home to many cultural and business elites. The town is part of the Northwest Hills Planning Region.

== History ==
=== Prehistoric period ===
Archeological evidence suggests that Native Americans first settled along the banks of the Shepaug River about 10,000 years ago, following the conclusion of the last ice age. Before the arrival of European settlers, the lands today comprising Washington were inhabited by the Wyantenock tribe.

=== Colonial era ===
In 1734, Joseph Hurlbut settled the eastern section of what is now Washington, marking the beginning of the town's inhabitation by colonists. The area around the Hurlbut homestead came to be known as the Judea Parish, a name preserved in the still active Judea Cemetery. The area was initially part of Woodbury.

In 1746, Edward Cogswell secured the right to mine iron ore, as part of the New Milford North Purchase, and established an ironworks along the East Aspetuck River in New Preston. 1746 also marked the purchase of land from the Wyantenock tribe by the Averill family for a homestead on Baldwin Hill, which is still occupied and farmed by direct descendants of the original inhabitants.

Washington was incorporated in 1779, with lands carved from the towns of Woodbury, Litchfield, Kent and New Milford. The town was named after George Washington, who traveled through the area several times during the American Revolution, and proverbially slept in New Preston in 1781. Major William Cogswell, son of Edward Cogswell, was elected the town's first selectman.

=== 19th century ===
Industrial Revolution. Early in the 19th century, small mills and factories proliferated along the Shepaug River in present-day Washington Depot, which came to be known as "Factory Hollow". Small-scale industry simultaneously appeared along the banks of the East Aspetuck River in New Preston.

Invention of Summer Camp. In 1861, Frederick W. Gunn, the abolitionist founder of the Gunnery prep school, opened one of America's earliest summer camp's in Washington.

Slavery Safe Harbor. Washington was a stop on the Underground Railroad. Local residents provided a safe harbor for slaves fleeing captivity, and organized efforts to throw bounty hunters off the tracks of their pursuits.

Arcadian Movement. The arrival of the Shepaug Railroad in Washington in 1872 introduced rail service to New York City, which brought an influx of new visitors. Architect Ehrick Rossiter, then a recent graduate of the local Gunnery prep school, saw an opportunity to establish an understated alternative to Greenwich, Newport, and the ostentation favored by the nouveaux riches of the day. In collaboration with a coterie of wealthy New York patrons, Rossiter remade the Washington Green area into an idyllic summer colony, transforming it into an idealized version of the quintessential New England village. During this period, the Congregational church received a makeover, commercial enterprises were eliminated for aesthetic purposes, and restrained but elegant summer homes—many of them designed by Rossiter himself—were constructed. Contemporaneously, new seasonal residents established themselves at Lake Waramaug in New Preston.

=== 20th century ===
Birth of Steep Rock. In 1925, architect Ehrick Rossiter donated 100 acres (0.40 km^{2}) of land along the Shepaug River to a group of trustees for the purpose of preserving it as open space, marking the founding of the Steep Rock Association land trust, which today holds land and conservation easements protecting more than 2,700 acres (11 km^{2}) in Washington.

Flood of 1955. In August 1955, two large storms passed over Litchfield County in close succession, flooding many local river valleys. North of Washington Depot, twin culverts carrying the Shepaug River under U.S. Route 202 were plugged with debris, causing floodwaters to accumulate upstream. The culverts and roadway succumbed to the resulting pressure, causing a wall of water to race down the river valley, washing away many of the homes and businesses in the Depot's village center, and killing a couple who ignored warnings to evacuate. A reconstruction effort, led by Henry B. Van Sinderen, and modeled after a town on Long Island, was quickly commenced. Homes and businesses soon reemerged, but the village lost many historic structures, and it has never regained its pre-flood density or vitality. The layout and visual character of the Depot were also radically altered, and the village center assumed its contemporary appearance, which varies considerably from Washington's traditional architectural vernacular.

Invasion of the Iroquois. In 1986, Iroquois Gas Transmission System sought permission from the Federal Energy Regulatory Commission to construct a 356-mile-long (573 km) natural gas pipeline through New York and Connecticut. The proposed route ran through Lake Waramaug's eastern watershed, across the Shepaug River, and through the Steep Rock Reservation, with a secondary spur running through Washington Green and Nettleton Hollow. The Washington Environmental Council became an intervenor in the proceedings, retained a prominent Washington, D.C., law firm, and mounted a vigorous opposition campaign. In 1989, Iroquois decided to reroute the pipeline, shifting it south of Washington's borders.

Shepaug River Lawsuit. In 1997, Washington residents voted unanimously to join a lawsuit against the City of Waterbury, which operates a reservoir at the headwaters of the Shepaug River in the adjacent town of Warren. Waterbury, which had long relied on the reservoir to supply water to its citizens, had come to view the river as a revenue stream, and was removing extra water to sell to neighboring municipalities. The lawsuit, which the town of Roxbury also joined, sought to compel Waterbury to release more water into the river, which slowed to a trickle during summer months, impeding important ecological functions. After considerable legal maneuvering on both sides, river advocates prevailed in February 2000, when a Superior Court judge ordered Waterbury to release more water into the Shepaug.

=== Contemporary Washington ===
In recent decades Washington has pushed back on developments and infrastructure projects in its local area, a form of NIMBYism. Washington does, however, rely on some such infrastructure—cell phone reception, water resources, and electricity supplies.

Sempra Fight. In 1998, Sempra Energy submitted a proposal to the Connecticut Siting Council to construct a power plant approximately 10 miles (16 km) south of Washington in New Milford. The plant was to emit 443 tons of pollutants per year, many of which would have projected toward Washington, owing to the region's prevailing wind patterns and complex terrain. The Washington Environmental Council hired environmental consultants, who demonstrated that the plan would be particularly harmful to New Preston and Lake Waramaug. The council became an intervenor in the proceedings and generated scientific evidence that was cited by the Siting Council when it unanimously rejected the permit application in 1999.

Cell phone coverage. In 2008, Optasite submitted an application to the Connecticut Siting Council to erect a telecommunications tower atop Tanner Hill in a visually conspicuous location above the Macricostas Preserve, some 250 feet (76 m) north of the Washington town line. The State of Connecticut had previously purchased the development rights for the land beneath the proposed tower site for farmland preservation. Washington's Conservation Commission became an intervenor in the application. Working with a coalition that included Governor Jodi Rell, Attorney General Richard Blumenthal, and an ad-hoc community organization called CROWW, they built an environmental and legal case against the tower proposal. In 2009, Optasite withdrew its application, and legislation was subsequently introduced in the Connecticut General Assembly to hold companies liable for costs incurred as a consequence of applications submitted to the Siting Council in bad faith.

== Geography ==
Washington is located in the Litchfield Hills region of Connecticut, approximately 22 miles (35 km) northeast of Danbury, 40 miles (64 km) west of Hartford, and 80 miles (130 km) northeast of New York City.

According to the United States Census Bureau, the town has a total area of 38.6 square miles (100.1 km^{2}), of which 38.1 square miles (98.6 km^{2}) are land and 0.58 square miles (1.5 km^{2}), or 1.48%, are water.

The dominant geographic features of Washington are the Shepaug, East Aspetuck, and Bantam river valleys. Lake Waramaug is in the northeast corner of the town. The landscape is characterized by rolling hills, high plateaus, and river and stream valleys. Mixed deciduous and coniferous forest covers most of Washington, but open agricultural fields are also prevalent.

=== Principal communities ===
- Washington Green
- Washington Depot
- New Preston
- Marbledale
- Woodville

=== Natural resources ===
- The Shepaug River flows north to south, roughly through the center of Washington, through a winding, largely undeveloped river valley. Substantial areas along the Shepaug have been preserved as open space, yielding a large and regionally unique protected riparian corridor. Major preserved areas include the 998-acre (4.04 km^{2}) Steep Rock Preserve and the 700-acre (2.8 km^{2}) Hidden Valley Preserve.
- Lake Waramaug, which is situated at the town's northwestern corner, at its border with Warren and Kent, is the second largest natural lake in Connecticut.
- Mount Tom and Mount Tom Pond are in Washington's northeast corner and share municipal boundaries with the towns of Morris and Litchfield. Mount Tom State Park is one of Connecticut's oldest state parks. A stone tower at the top of the mountain affords distant views and attracts many hikers.
- Meeker Swamp is a large complex of exceptionally high-quality wetlands which overlay a geologically distinctive aquifer. Primary portions of the swamp are located within the 360-acre (150 ha) Macricostas Preserve. The area provides regionally unique habitat areas for migratory birds and numerous rare plant and animal species, while the aquifer—Washington's largest—includes substantial reserves of potable water.
- The ridgeline running east–west along Washington's northern boundary, between Lake Waramaug and the Shepaug River, forms the edge of the northern portion of the Highlands of Connecticut, New Jersey, New York, and Pennsylvania.

== Demographics ==
Historical population
Census	Pop.	Note	%±
1820	1,487		—
1850	1,832		—
1860	1,659		−9.4%
1870	1,563		−5.8%
1880	1,590		1.7%
1890	1,633		2.7%
1900	1,820		11.5%
1910	1,747		−4.0%
1920	1,619		−7.3%
1930	1,775		9.6%
1940	2,089		17.7%
1950	2,227		6.6%
1960	2,603		16.9%
1970	3,121		19.9%
1980	3,657		17.2%
1990	3,905		6.8%
2000	3,596		−7.9%
2010	3,578		−0.5%
2020	3,646		1.9%
U.S. Decennial Census

Many families have local histories dating back to the Colonial period. The town is overwhelmingly caucasian, has a substantial gay population, and is unusually urbane for a rural community. A significant percentage of homes are occupied on a part-time basis, with their owners residing principally in New York City or elsewhere. Consequently, census data may not accurately reflect the population's demography.

As of the census of 2000, there were 3,596 people, 1,416 households, and 951 families residing in the town. The population density was 94.2 inhabitants per square mile (36.4/km^{2}). There were 1,764 housing units at an average density of 46.2 per square mile (17.8/km^{2}). The racial makeup of the town was 95.66% White, 0.64% African American, 0.11% Native American, 1.56% Asian, 0.78% from other races, and 1.25% from two or more races. Hispanic or Latino of any race were 2.14% of the population.

There were 1,416 households, out of which 28.0% had children under the age of 18 living with them, 57.6% were married couples living together, 6.8% had a female householder with no husband present, and 32.8% were non-families. 26.4% of all households were made up of individuals, and 10.9% had someone living alone who was 65 years of age or older. The average household size was 2.42 and the average family size was 2.94.

In the town, the population was spread out, with 24.4% under the age of 18, 6.0% from 18 to 24, 23.9% from 25 to 44, 29.9% from 45 to 64, and 15.8% who were 65 years of age or older. The median age was 43 years. For every 100 females, there were 100.2 males. For every 100 females age 18 and over, there were 92.9 males.

The median income for a household in the town was $65,288, and the median income for a family was $80,745. Males had a median income of $51,610 versus $35,337 for females. The per capita income for the town was $37,215. About 2.7% of families and 3.3% of the population were below the poverty line, including 1.5% of those under age 18 and 9.3% of those age 65 or over.

== Government ==
Washington has a traditional New England town meeting form of government, which operates under the Connecticut General Statutes. Town meetings serve as Washington's chief legislative body, and several specialized boards and commissions, run by volunteer residents, tend to municipal business.

An elected board of selectmen manages day-to-day town affairs, and an elected board of finance tends to municipal financial matters. A planning commission, consisting of members appointed by the board of selectmen, engages in long-range town planning—particularly with respect to land-use—and decennially prepares a Plan of Conservation and Development. The planning commission also establishes regulations concerning the subdivision of land, and reviews and acts upon subdivision proposals. An elected zoning commission promulgates and applies zoning regulations, and an inland wetlands commission, appointed by the board of selectmen, regulates activities in or near wetlands and watercourses. A historic district commission reviews development proposals within Washington's historic districts, and issues certificates of appropriateness for proposals it approves. A conservation commission, also appointed by the board of selectmen, establishes advisory conservation policies, advocates for the conservation of Washington's natural and cultural resources, and acquires and manages municipal open space, consisting of land owned by the town and conservation easements held on private property.

Washington's volunteer boards and commissions are supplemented by a small paid staff, which includes the full-time elected positions of First Selectman, Town Clerk, Tax Collector, and Judge of Probate. The town also has a paid land-use coordinator, zoning enforcement officer, inland wetlands enforcement officer, assessor, building inspector, and administrative staff, as well as a road crew and building maintenance person.

=== Civic life ===
Washington has a culture of volunteerism and active civic engagement. Many residents give freely of their time and resources to operate town government, provide emergency services, and support local community organizations. The town has unusually high voter turnout rates, and, in several elections, has had the highest level of voter participation of any municipality in Connecticut. For example, Washington's voter turnout rate in the 2004 presidential election was as high as 93.08%

=== Conservation focus ===
Successive generations of Washington residents have actively supported land conservation efforts, and their gifts of property and conservation easements to local land trusts have yielded large tracts of permanent open space.

The town's strong conservation ethic is also evident in its land-use policies, which strictly limit new development. Washington was one of the first Connecticut municipalities to establish zoning regulations, which were enacted in 1939, The town's contemporary land-use policies are substantially natural resource-based, and they have been expressly conceived to maintain the community's rural character. Washington is one of only two municipalities in Connecticut to base permissible residential density on the soils composition of land parcels, and it was one of the first Connecticut towns to adopt net-density subdivision regulations, which render wetlands, flood plains, and steep slopes ineligible for satisfying the minimum acreage requirements for creating new building lots Consequently, even large tracts of land may not qualify for subdivision. Washington's inland wetlands regulations are similarly rigorous

Development proposals seen as posing a threat to the town's natural resources or rural character typically elicit controversy and often result in litigation, which is quietly underwritten by Washington's deep-pocketed and well-connected residents.

Registration and Party Enrollment Statistics as of October 17, 2025
Party	Active voters	Inactive voters	Total voters	Percentage
Republican	570	40	610	22.0%
Democratic	966	111	1,077	38.8%
Unaffiliated	914	124	1,038	37.4%
Minor Parties	44	5	49	1.8%
Total	2,494	280	2,774	100%

== Economy ==
Washington's economy has changed considerably over the course of the town's history. At various points, iron works, logging, manufacturing, and farming have driven local economic activity, but contemporary Washington has no industrial base, and only a handful of farms remain active. Today, the local economy is centered on the town's population of affluent, part-time residents, whose income, for the most part, is not locally derived. The design, construction, renovation, decoration, maintenance, and sale of country houses accounts for a substantial portion of local economic activity. Restaurants, inns, speciality retail shops, and professional services also play an important role in Washington's economy, as do educational institutions.

== Infrastructure ==
=== Transportation ===
U.S. Route 202 runs east–west in the northern part of town, connecting the villages of Marbledale, New Preston, and Woodville. Connecticut Route 109 runs east–west near the town's geographic center, connecting Washington Depot with New Milford and Morris. The main north–south highways are Route 47, Route 199, and Route 45. There is no public transportation within the town.

=== Architecture ===
A substantial percentage of the houses in Washington were built prior to 1950, and many of the structures built since then have faithfully followed the town's rural New England vernacular, resulting in an unusual degree of architectural cohesion. Washington has many well preserved historic homes, built in the Georgian, Greek Revival, Italianate, and Shingle styles, and many 19th century mill structures, barns, and other agricultural outbuildings.

The Connecticut Historical Commission conducted a comprehensive inventory of historic structures in Washington and in 2000 published the voluminous "Historic and Architectural Resource Survey of Washington, Connecticut," which includes detailed information about dozens of historic structures throughout the town.

=== Historic districts ===
Washington includes three municipal historic district and one federally designated National Register district.

- The Washington Green Historic District encompasses the area around the Congregational Church and includes portions of Green Hill Road, Kirby Road, Parsonage Lane, and Old North Road. The district includes several buildings designed by architect Ehrick Rossiter, together with well-preserved 18th- and 19th-century houses designed in the Georgian, Greek Revival, and Italianate styles.
- The Calhoun–Ives Historic District runs along Calhoun Street and Ives Road. It is Connecticut's only agricultural historic district and is characterized by modestly scaled 18th- and 19th-century farmhouses, built in the Georgian and Greek Revival styles, together with accompanying agricultural outbuildings, farm fields, and fruit orchards.
- The Sunny Ridge Historic District encompasses the area along Sunny Ridge Road, just south of its junction with Connecticut Route 109, and includes several well-preserved 18th century Georgian homes.
- The New Preston Hill Historic District overlays portions of the top of New Preston Hill, along New Preston Hill Road and Findlay Road, approximately three quarters of a mile west of the New Preston village center. The structures in this district are built principally in the Georgian style.

== Education ==
Washington is part of the Connecticut Region 12 School District, which operates the following schools in Washington:

- Reach Preschool
- Washington Primary School
- Shepaug Valley School (secondary)

The town is also home to four private educational institutions:

- Rumsey Hall School
- The Gunnery
- Devereux Glenholme School
- Washington Montessori School

== Notable people ==
- Christopher Andersen, journalist and author
- Helen Armstrong, violinist
- Christine Baranski, actress
- Robert Barnett, choreographer
- Peter Brimelow, magazine editor
- Graydon Carter, editor of Vanity Fair magazine
- Marie-Chantal, Crown Princess of Greece
- Jim Dine, artist
- Rufus Easton, U.S. congressman
- Eden Gray, actress and writer on tarot who was educated at the Wykeham Rise School, a girl's boarding school in Washington
- Ezra Hasbrouck Fitch, co-founder of Abercrombie & Fitch
- Benjamin Delahauf Foulois, aviator
- Matthew Franjola, former reporter and photographer for the Associated Press
- William Hamilton Gibson, illustrator, author and naturalist
- Frederick Gunn, abolitionist, educator, and inventor of summer camp
- Thomas Hastings, composer
- Ann Hodgman, author
- Alfred R. Kelman, film producer & director
- Dan Lufkin, co-founder of Donaldson, Lufkin & Jenrette
- Paul Marks, scientist
- Jeff McCracken, actor, director, producer
- Danny Meyer, restaurateur
- Robert Mnuchin, art dealer and former banker
- Conan O'Brien, comedian
- David Owen, author
- Pavlos, Crown Prince of Greece
- Moses Pendleton, choreographer
- Orville Hitchcock Platt, U.S. senator, 1879–1905, author of the Platt Amendment dictating U.S.-Cuba relations after 1901
- Joan Rivers, comedian
- Ehrick Rossiter, architect
- Scott Rudin, film producer
- George Soros, financier
- Art Spiegelman, cartoonist
- Phil Stong, novelist
- Peter C. Sutton, art historian
- James Taylor, musician
- William vanden Heuvel, diplomat and author
- Chris von Wangenheim, photographer
- Heather Watts, dancer
- Elisha Whittlesey, US congressman
- Damian Woetzel, dancer
- Jonathan Wolken, choreographer
- Stuart Woods, author

== Culture ==
Popular seasonal events include the Harvest Festival in October, and Holiday in the Depot in December.

== In popular culture ==
Television writer/producer Amy Sherman-Palladino used a trip to Washington Depot and the Mayflower Inn with her husband Daniel as the inspiration and basis for the fictional town of Stars Hollow seen in her television series Gilmore Girls, along with Lorelai Gilmore's workplace, the Independence Inn. A Gilmore Girls fan festival took place in the town in October 2016, in anticipation of the series' Netflix revival.

Portions of the 1981 horror movie Friday the 13th, Part 2, were filmed in New Preston.

Author Stuart Woods' principal character Stone Barrington had a house in Washington and often ate at the Mayflower Inn. He drives from Manhattan to Washington in numerous novels.
