= Marbledale, Connecticut =

Coordinates: 41.663°N 73.369°W

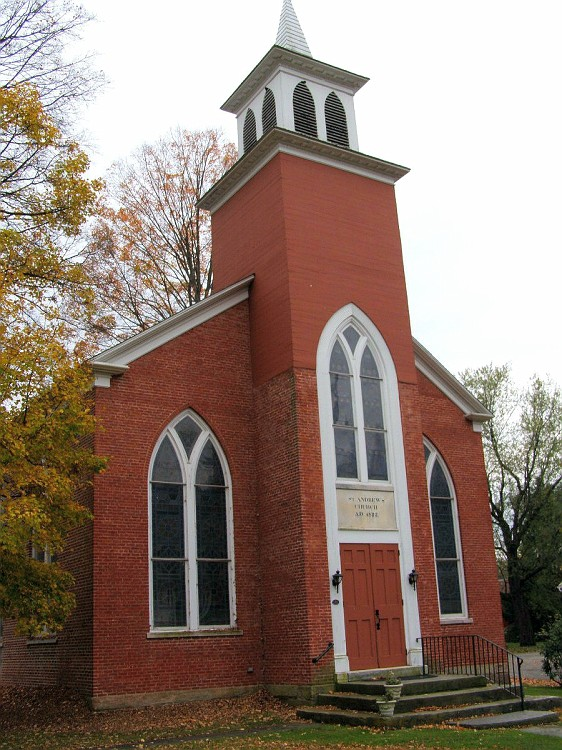
St. Andrew's Episcopal Church

Marbledale or Marble Dale is a village in the town of Washington in Litchfield County, Connecticut. For U.S. Census purposes, it is included in the census-designated place of New Preston. Marbledale is part of the postal ZIP code 06777, officially known as New Preston Marble Dale.

During the 19th century, Marbledale was the site of a prosperous cooper's shop. The village is the location of St. Andrew's Episcopal Church, a Gothic Revival style church from 1822 that is listed on the National Register of Historic Places in 1994.

Marbledale is one of five villages in the rural town of Washington. A Marbledale Village Business District and a Marbledale Gateway District were proposed in 2003 planning documents of the Town of Washington. Both run along New Milford Turnpike (U.S. Route 202), with the village area running southwest to the town line of New Milford, Connecticut, and the gateway district running northeast.
