= Calhoun–Ives Historic District =

Historic district in Connecticut, United States

- U.S. National Register of Historic Places
- U.S. Historic district
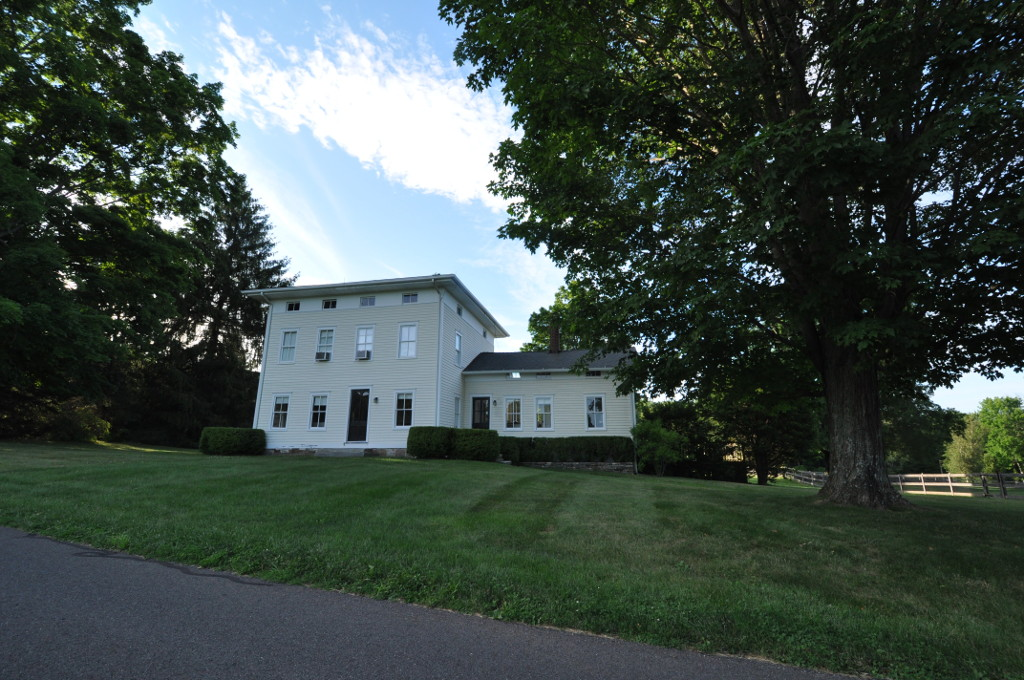

- Location within Connecticut Location within the United States
- Location: 79-262 Calhoun Street and 11 and 12 Ives Road, Washington, Connecticut
- Coordinates: 41°39′34″N 73°19′58″W
- Area: 475 acres (192 ha)
- Built: 1765
- Architect: Calhoun, Daniel; et al.
- Architectural style: Colonial, Greek Revival, Post-Modern
- NRHP reference No.: 95001344
- Added to NRHP: November 22, 1995

The Calhoun–Ives Historic District, or more formally the Calhoun Street–Ives Road Historic District, is a locally and nationally designated rural agricultural historic district in the town of Washington, Connecticut. It is located a mile north of the village of Washington Depot, Connecticut. It runs along Calhoun Street and Ives Road. It is characterized by modestly scaled 18th and 19th century farmhouses, together with accompanying agricultural outbuildings, farm fields, and fruit orchards, set along roads lined by stone walls. The district was listed on the National Register of Historic Places in 1995.

== Description and history ==
The Calhoun-Ives area of northwestern Washington was first settled in the 1730s, when it was part of the towns of Woodbury and Kent. The earliest settlers, members of the Calhoun, Ives, and Averill families, purchased land from Native Americans. At first, the local farmers engaged in subsistence farming, but by the mid-19th century a trend toward market-driven dairy farming took hold, and is reflected in the changed layouts and outbuildings of the district's farm properties.

The historic district encompasses virtually all of the properties fronting in Calhoun Street and Ives Road. Including the agricultural fields, the district is about 475 acres (192 ha) in size, including a land area extending to Baldwin Hill Road in the south, Kielwasser Road in the north, and in part to Bee Brook Road in the east. The oldest house, built by James Calhoun c. 1765, is at 156 Calhoun Street. There are many examples of 19th-century barns and other farm outbuildings, and several of the house are high-quality examples of Greek Revival architecture.

== See also ==
- National Register of Historic Places listings in Litchfield County, Connecticut
