= East Aspetuck River =

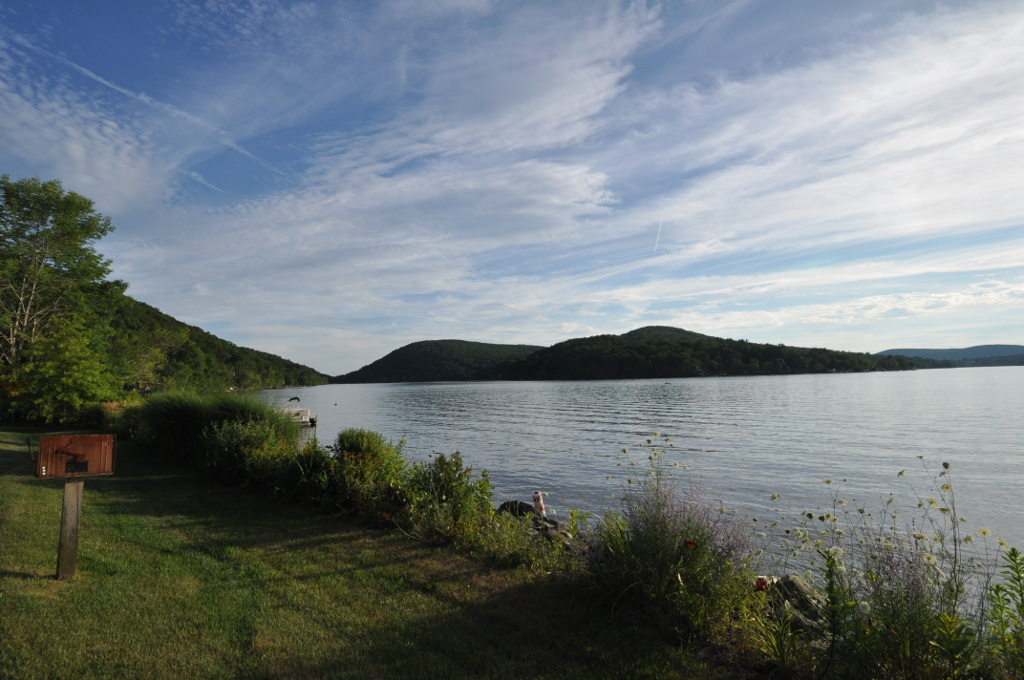
- Lake Waramaug looking toward Mount Bushnell and the headwaters of the East Aspetuck River Source and mouth of East Aspetuck River in Connecticut

Location
- Country: United States
- States: Connecticut
- Towns: Washington, New Milford

Physical characteristics
- Source: Lake Waramaug
  - location: Washington, Connecticut
  - coordinates: (41°40′58″N 73°21′13″W)
  - elevation: 692 ft (211 m)
- Mouth: West Branch Aspetuck River
  - location: New Milford, Connecticut
  - coordinates: (41°35′16″N 73°25′24″W)
  - elevation: 203 ft (62 m)
- Length: 9.9 mi (15.9 km)
- Basin size: 16,169.24 acres (6,543.46 ha)
- Width
  - maximum: 30 feet (9.1 m)

Basin features
- River system: Housatonic
- Gradient: 50.80 fpm

The East Aspetuck River is a 9.9-mile-long (15.9 km) river in Litchfield County, Connecticut, in the United States. It flows in a southwesterly direction from its source at Lake Waramaug, in the town of Washington, through the villages of New Preston and Northville, before joining the West Aspetuck River in New Milford, a half a mile before emptying into the Housatonic River. It is a designated "wild trout management area," with special regulations in effect for its entire length.
