= Sunny Ridge Historic District =

Historic district in Connecticut, United States

- U.S. National Register of Historic Places
- U.S. Historic district
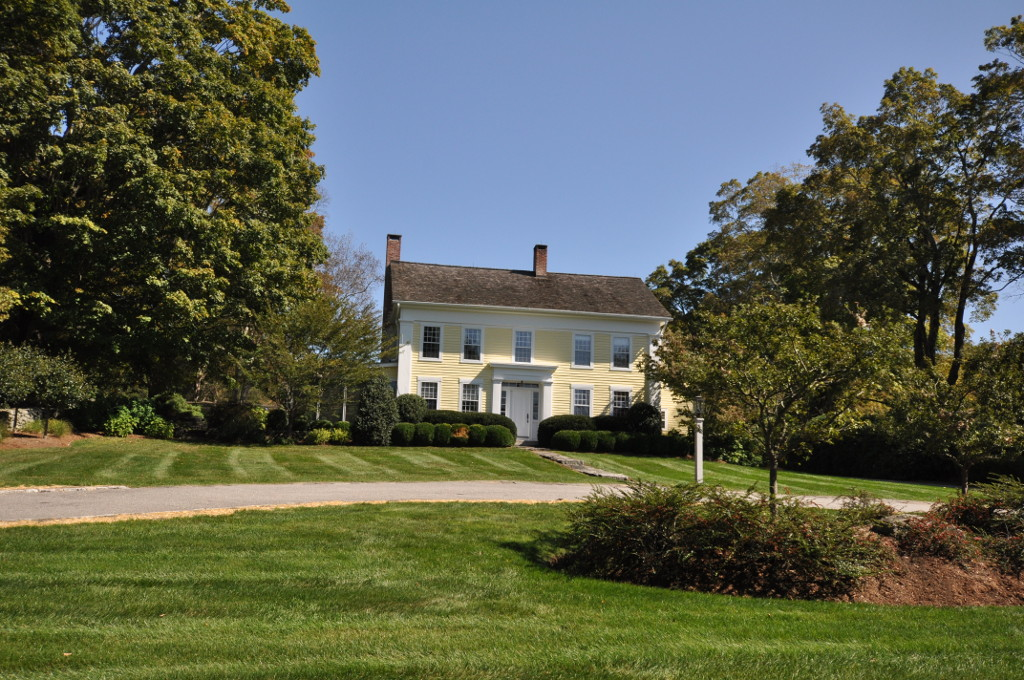

- Location within Connecticut Location within the United States
- Location: 2, 20 Nettleton Hollow Road, 145 Old Litchfield Road, 6 Romford Road and 10-32 Sunny Ridge Road, Washington, Connecticut
- Coordinates: 41°39′27″N 73°16′36″W
- Area: 175 acres (71 ha)
- Built: 1748
- Built by: Canfield, Lewis; Canfield, Daniel
- Architectural style: Greek Revival, Colonial Revival, Colonial:Post Med. English
- NRHP reference No.: 95001346
- Added to NRHP: November 22, 1995

The Sunny Ridge Historic District encompasses a historic former crossroads village in Washington, Connecticut. It consists of properties abutting the triangular intersection of Sunny Ridge Road, Nettletown Hollow Road, and Old Litchfield Road (Connecticut Route 109). This area was in the 18th and 19th centuries a stop on a north–south stagecoach and mail route. It was listed on the National Register of Historic Places in 1995.

== Description and history ==
The Nettleton Hollow area was one of the first places to be settled in the 18th century in Washington. The Nettleton Hollow Road had been cut through the area, serving travelers between Hartford and Cornwall, where connections to the Albany, New York could be made. The presence of local cross roads presented the opportunity to establish taverns. One, the Rising Sun Tavern at 6 Romford Road, was established in 1748 and enlarged in the early 19th century, while a second (at 20 Nettleton Hollow Road) was established c. 1790. The area flourished until the stage routes declined in the later years of the 19th century.

The historic district includes all of the property immediately surrounding the triangle formed by Nettletown Hollow Road, Sunny Ridge Road, and Old Litchfield Road. It includes ten houses, seven of which are historically significant, as well as a number of 19th-century outbuildings, including barns and sheds. All of the buildings are of wood-frame construction, the houses generally 1-1/2 or 2 1/2 stories in height. The total area of the district is 175 acres (71 ha).

== See also ==
- National Register of Historic Places listings in Litchfield County, Connecticut
