= New Preston Hill Historic District =

Historic district in Connecticut, United States

- U.S. National Register of Historic Places
- U.S. Historic district
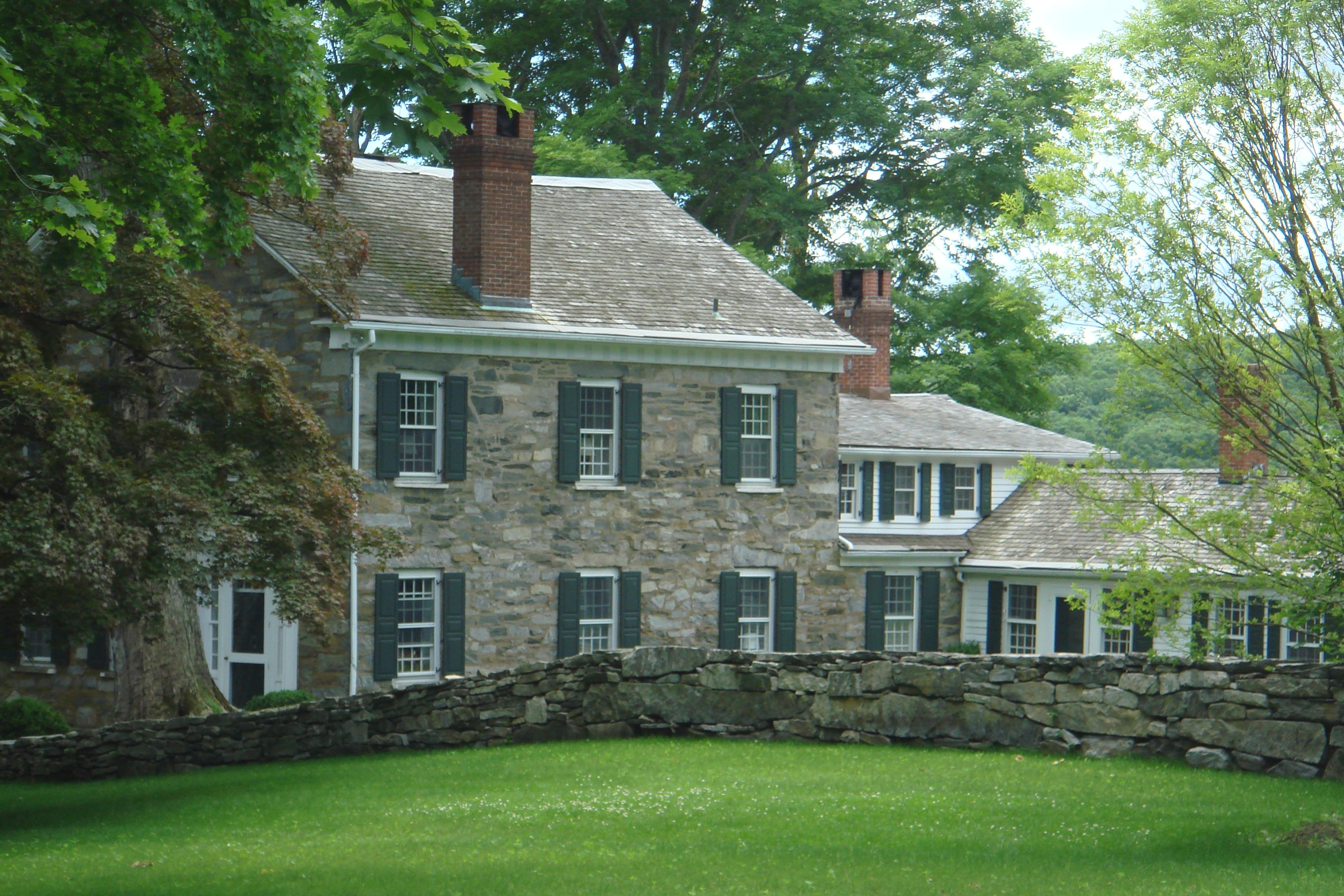
- A former tavern

- Location within Connecticut Location within the United States
- Location: New Preston Hill, Findley and Gunn Hill Roads, Washington, Connecticut
- Coordinates: 41°40′28″N 73°22′17″W
- Area: 210 acres (85 ha)
- Architectural style: Colonial, Italianate, Federal
- NRHP reference No.: 85001931
- Added to NRHP: August 26, 1985

The New Preston Hill Historic District encompasses a small rural 19th-century village center in the New Preston area of the town of Washington, in Litchfield County, Connecticut. Settled in the late 18th century, it is distinctive for its examples of stone architecture, include a rare Federal period stone church. The district, located at the junction of New Preston Road with Gunn Hill and Findlay Roads, was listed on the National Register of Historic Places in 1985.

== Description and history ==
The New Preston area was first settled in the 1750s, and the New Preston Hill junction was where its first meeting house was built in 1754. The area was by then of recognized significance for the crossroads, with New Preston Road serving as a stage route between Hartford, Connecticut and the Hudson River. The village supported the surrounding agricultural community, but declined in importance in the mid-19th century, when the village New Preston became more important for the water power the drove its industries.

The historic district encompasses about 210 acres (85 ha) around the junction of New Preston Road with Gunn Hill Road and Findlay Road. The main focus of the district is a triangular green, with the 1824 Old Stone Church as its main focus. This church has no heat or electricity and is used during the summer and for weddings. The church has another building, the "Village Church" that is used for the rest of the year, outside this district. The district includes other nine other mainly residential properties surrounding the green, and extending westward along New Preston Road.

There are 12 contributing buildings:

- Hill Congregational Church, which "dominates" the district; it has been documented in drawings by the Historic American Buildings Survey
- a district school
- a parsonage
- Rev. Samuel Whittlesey House, from 1808
- John Ferris House, from 1800
- Newton's Tavern, c. 1900, a Federal/Greek Revival building with 12 over 12 windows (meaning 12 panes in upper and lower sashes)
- a tollhouse from the 18th century, which has lost exterior appearance as such
- house on Parcel 25, Federal/Greek Revival, with fluted pilasters, above the road behind a stone wall. Property also has a barn
- house on Parcel 26
- house on Parcel 33
- house on Parcel 35
- horse barn on Parcel 35
- sheep barn on Parcel 35

== See also ==
- National Register of Historic Places listings in Litchfield County, Connecticut
