= MOMIX =

American dance company

- Origin: Washington, Connecticut, U.S.
- Genre: Dance
- Years active: 1981–present
- Label: representation: Julio Alvarez/Duetto 2000 / Margaret Selby / Selby Artist Mgmt
- Website: MOMIX Website

MOMIX, a dance company based in Washington, Connecticut, was founded in 1981 by Choreographer Moses Pendleton. MOMIX was conceptualised 'out of work' Pendleton did for the celebration of Erik Satie at the Paris Opera in 1978. The company is named after a solo, "Momix," that Pendleton created for the 1980 Winter Olympics in Lake Placid. An offshoot of the dance company Pilobolus, which Pendleton co-founded in 1971, MOMIX presents works that combine acrobatics, dance, gymnastics, mime, props, and film in a theatrical setting. The company has toured internationally, performing in five continents. MOMIX is a for-profit contemporary dance company.

== Theatre, film and television ==
MOMIX has made five Italian RAI television features broadcast to 55 countries (including the USSR and China) and has performed on Antenne II in France. MOMIX was also featured in PBS's “Dance in America” series and on Canadian television with Charles Dutoit and the Montreal Symphony in the Rhombus Media film of Mussorgsky's “Pictures at an Exhibition,” winner of an International Emmy for Best Performing Arts Special.

In 1992, Pendleton created "Bat Habits," developed with the support of the Scottsdale (Arizona) Cultural Council/Scottsdale Center for the Arts and the University of Washington to celebrate the opening of the San Francisco Giants' new spring training park in Scottsdale, Arizona. This work was the forerunner of “Baseball,” which was created by Pendleton in 1994.

MOMIX is featured in one of the first IMAX films in 3-D, “IMAGINE,” which premiered at the Taejon Expo 93 and was subsequently released at IMAX theatres worldwide. In the film “FX II,” under the direction of Moses Pendleton, MOMIX dancers Cynthia Quinn and Karl Baumann star in the role of “Bluey.” In 2004, “White Widow,” co-choreographed by Pendleton and Cynthia Quinn, was featured in Robert Altman's movie, “The Company.” The company has also participated in the "Homage a Picasso" in Paris and was selected to represent the United States at the European Cultural Center at Delphi.

== Corporate work ==
MOMIX has created special shows for product launches, as well as national television commercials for major corporations. Clients have included Mercedes Benz, Fiat, BMW, Kohler, Hanes, Target Stores, Walmart, and MAC Cosmetics.

== Productions ==
- PASSION (1990)
- BASEBALL (1994)
- OPUS CACTUS (2001)
- LUNAR SEA (2004)
- BOTANICA (2009)
- ALCHEMY (2013)
- VIVA MOMIX (2015)
- ALICE (2019)

== Artistic staff ==
- Artistic Director, Moses Pendleton
- Associate Director, Cynthia Quinn

== Dancers ==
- Jennifer Chicheportiche
- Rebecca Rasmussen (Dance Captain)
- Catherine Jaeger
- Sarah Nachbauer
- Simona Di Tucci
- Beau Campbell
- Lauren Jaeger
- Steven Ezra (Dance Captain)
- Greg Dearmond
- Anthony Bocconi
- Jason Williams
- Morgan Hulen
- Jade Primicias
- Heather Conn
- Sean Langford
- Seah Hagan
- Colton Wall
- Elise Pacicco
- Aurelie Garcia
- Nathaniel Davis
- Adam Ross
- Derek Elliott Jr
- Madeline Dwyer
