= Washington Green Historic District =

Historic district in Connecticut, United States

- U.S. National Register of Historic Places
- U.S. Historic district
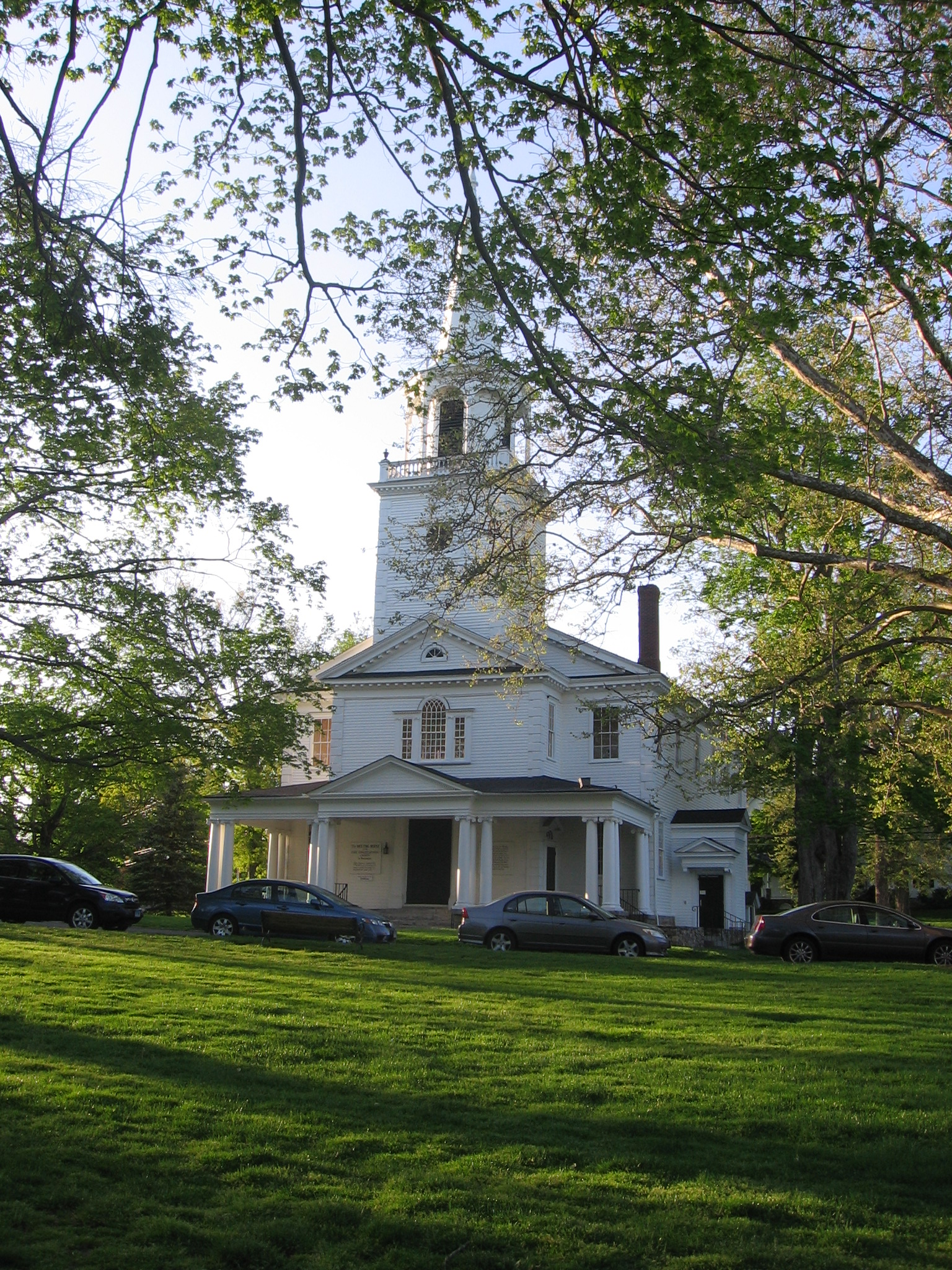

- Location within Connecticut Location within the United States
- Location: Roughly, along Ferry Bridge, Green Hill, Kirby, Roxbury, Wykeham and Woodbury Roads, Parsonage Lane and The Green, Washington, Connecticut
- Coordinates: 41°37′37″N 73°18′29″W
- Area: 85 acres (34 ha)
- Architect: Rossiter, Ehrick K.
- Architectural style: Mid 19th Century Revival, Early Republic, Colonial
- NRHP reference No.: 95001345
- Added to NRHP: November 27, 1995

The Washington Green Historic District encompasses the historic village green of the town of Washington, Connecticut, and much of the surrounding village center. It extends mainly along Kirby and Woodbury Roads, and includes a diverse collection of architecture from the 18th to early 20th centuries. It was listed on the National Register of Historic Places in 1995.

== Description and history ==
Washington village was settled in 1734, and its Congregational society was formed in 1741. The basic layout of the town green dates to this early period. The surrounding area developed agriculturally, and the village center's growth was boosted by the founding in 1850 of The Gunnery, a private boarding school still in operation today. In the late 19th century the village character began to be shaped by a growing number of summer residents.

The historic district covers an irregularly shaped area of about 85 acres (34 ha), whose principal focal elements are the triangular town green and the campus of The Gunnery. Its southern boundary is Ferry Bridge Road, and its eastern boundary is Green Hill Road and Wykeham Road to its junction with Old North Road. On the west side, it extends along Kirby Road and Green Hill Road, and on the northern side it extends beyond the green for a short distance along Parsonal Lane. The district is characterized by a large number of white-painted wood-frame structures, typically with Colonial, Colonial Revival, or Greek Revival styling, although this scheme has been augmented by a number of masonry structures dating mainly to the late 19th and early 20th centuries. A significant number of buildings in the district were designed by Ehrick K. Rossiter, an architect who was a graduate of the Gunnery.

== See also ==
- National Register of Historic Places listings in Litchfield County, Connecticut
