= Judea Cemetery =

Colonial era cemetery in Connecticut

Judea Cemetery (or Old Judea Cemetery)
- Interactive map of Judea Cemetery (or Old Judea Cemetery)

Details
- Location: Washington, Connecticut, U.S.
- Coordinates: 41°37′33″N 73°18′02″W
- Style: Public, secular
- Owned by: Town of Washington, Connecticut, U.S.
- No. of graves: At least 600
- Find a Grave: Judea Cemetery

Judea Cemetery, also known as Old Judea Cemetery, is a colonial era burying ground located on Judea Road in Washington, Connecticut, United States. Before it became a separate town in 1779, and chose to name itself "Washington", the area was known as "Judea", and was part of Woodbury, Connecticut.

Judea Cemetery is the site of a monument in honor of "Jeff Liberty and His Colored Patriots", erected in the early 20th century. The cemetery is thought to be the resting place of a number of African-American soldiers who served in the American Revolutionary War, including Jeff Liberty. Liberty was enslaved by Continental Army Captain Jonathan Farrand, who is buried in Old Judea. Captain Farrand manumitted Jeff Liberty for fighting in the Continental Army. "Liberty" is known to have been chosen as a surname by a number of enslaved people who were manumitted in this era.

Spy thriller novelist Edward S. Aarons (1916–1975) is buried in Judea.
