= Matthew Franjola =

American photojournalist (1942–2015)

Matthew J. Franjola (October 26, 1942 – January 1, 2015) was an American journalist, photographer and foreign correspondent for the Associated Press. Franjola, who covered the Vietnam War for the AP, was one of the last Americans to leave Saigon during the fall of the city to the North Vietnamese in 1975.

In 1964, Franjola trained to join the Peace Corps, but was not selected for the program. After his rejection from the Peace Corps, he joined the staff of a war supplies company and was sent to South Vietnam during the 1960s, where he joined the Associated Press. He covered events in Cambodia and Vietnam during the Vietnam War. He remained in Saigon as one of the last American reporters in the city, even after other correspondents had fled.

He later worked as a gold miner in Zimbabwe (as the country transitioned from Rhodesia) and South Africa during the 1970s and 1980s. Franjola returned to the United States after decades living and reporting in Africa and Asia. He settled in Washington, Connecticut, where he served on the Region 12 Board of Education. He owned and operated a business called Board and Beam, which dismantles older homes and barns to reuse and refurbish their materials.

== Death ==
He died at Danbury Hospital in Danbury, Connecticut, on January 1, 2015, aged 72, following a lengthy illness.
