= Mount Bushnell State Park =

State park in Litchfield County, Connecticut

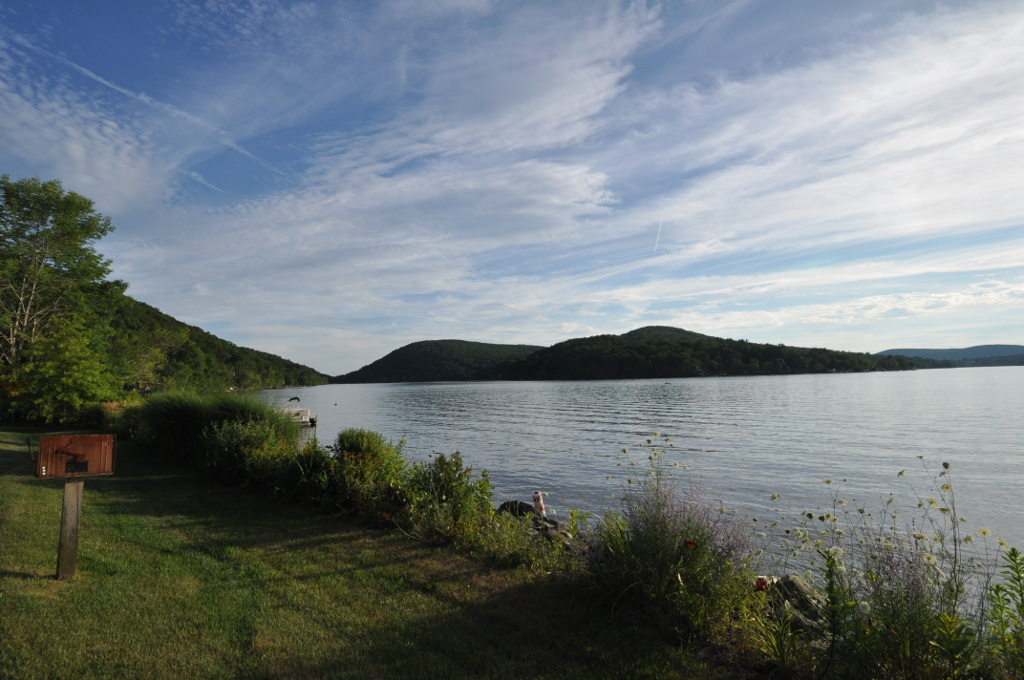
- Mount Bushnell across the waters of Lake Waramaug

- Location within Connecticut Location within the United States
- Location: Washington, Connecticut, United States
- Coordinates: 41°41′22″N 73°21′51″W
- Area: 214 acres (87 ha)
- Elevation: 1,201 ft (366 m)
- Established: 1916
- Administrator: Connecticut Department of Energy and Environmental Protection
- Designation: Connecticut state park
- Website: Official website

Mount Bushnell State Park is an undeveloped public recreation area located south of Lake Waramaug in the New England town of Washington, Connecticut. The state park provides 214 acres (87 ha) for hiking. The park had its genesis in the state's purchase of 70 acres in 1916. It is managed by the Connecticut Department of Energy and Environmental Protection.
