= Pilobolus (dance company) =

American modern dance company

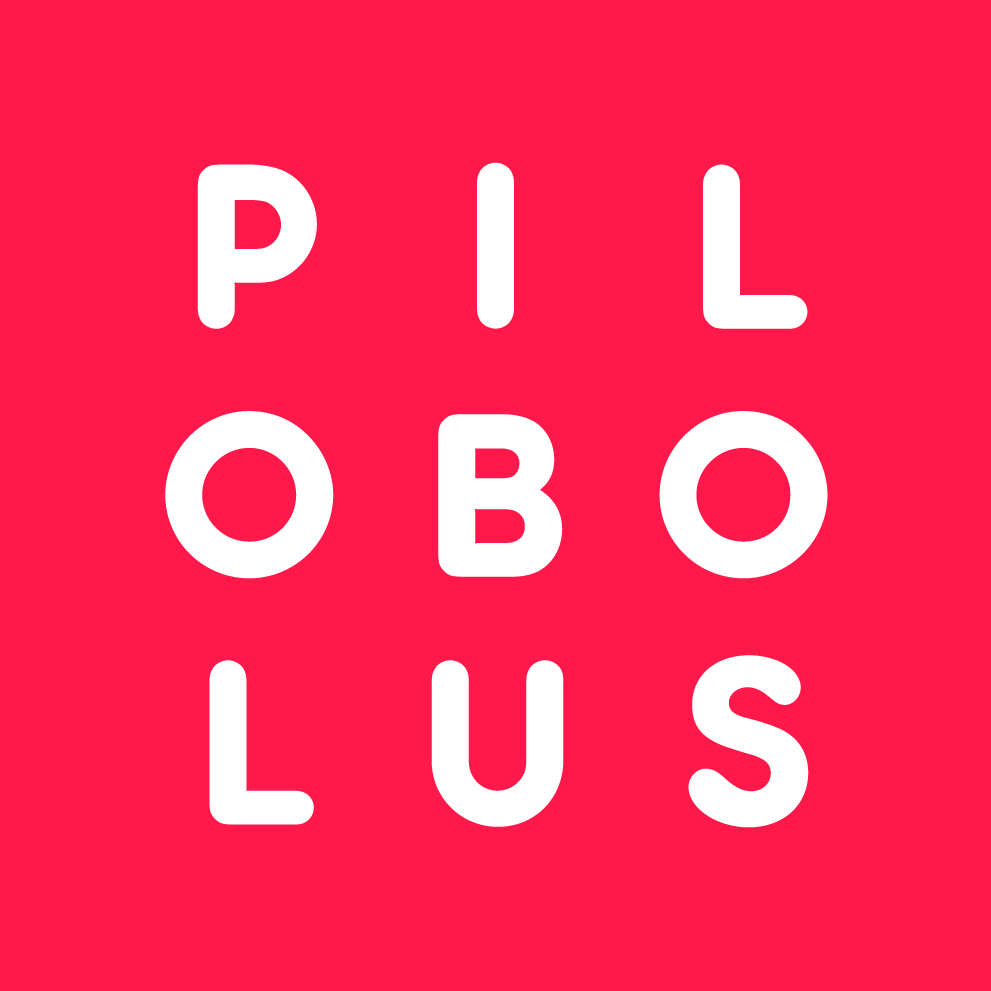

General information
- Name: Pilobolus
- Year founded: October 1971
- Founders: Robby Barnett, Alison Becker Chase, Martha Clarke, Lee Harris, Moses Pendleton, Michael Tracy, and Jonathan Wolken
- Website: pilobolus.org

Artistic staff
- Artistic director: Matt Kent

Pilobolus is an American modern dance company that began performing in October 1971. Pilobolus has performed over 100 choreographic works in more than 64 countries around the world, and has been featured on the 79th Annual Academy Awards, The Oprah Winfrey Show and Late Night with Conan O'Brien.

Pilobolus Dance Theatre has three main branches: a touring company, Pilobolus, that creates new works through the International Collaborators Project; an educational programming arm that teaches the company's group-based creative process; and Pilobolus Creative Services, which offers movement services for film, advertising, publishing, commercial clients and corporate events.

== History ==
Pilobolus is named after a phototropic fungus, named Pilobolus, that Jonathan Wolken's father was studying in a lab at the time of the company's inception. The fungus grows on cow dung and propels itself with extraordinary strength, speed and accuracy.

Pilobolus was founded by a group of Dartmouth College students in 1971. Its inception work, from which the company is named, was developed in Alison Becker Chase's choreography class. Pilobolus has long been based in Washington Depot, Connecticut, with offices in New York City and Belgium. The company tours domestically and internationally, performing works from its over 100-piece repertory as well as new pieces, created at a pace of about two per year.

The founding members were Robby Barnett, Alison Becker Chase, Martha Clarke, Lee Harris, Moses Pendleton, Michael Tracy, and Jonathan Wolken. Harris departed around 1975, leaving six members: four men and two women. In November 1977, Pilobolus made its Broadway debut in a limited engagement at the St. James Theater, to great acclaim. Arlene Croce, writing in the New Yorker, praised the group as "six of the most extraordinary people now performing."

Martha Clarke left in 1978. Pendleton left in 1990 after having collaborated with Chase in 1980 to form the offshoot group Momix. The four remaining founders (Barnett, Chase, Tracy, and Wolken) continued as artistic directors, choreographing collectively and in various combinations in collaboration with new dancers brought into the company in subsequent years. Chase left in 2006 and went on to found her own company, Alison Chase Performance. Wolken died in 2010.

Pilobolus performances are characterized by a strong element of physical interaction between the bodies of the performers and exaggerations or contortions of the human form (or other anthropomorphic forms), requiring extreme strength, flexibility and athleticism. From early on, the company "made a specialty of playful topsy-turvy entanglements that defied anatomical logic" and which sometimes "gave rise to bizarre imagery." This approach broke new ground, and soon "even choreographers who did not consciously borrow from the group enjoyed new license in bringing bodies (especially men) into closer physical contact" than previously.

In 1980, Pilobolus performed "Black and Blue" with live music by the duo Stormin’ Norman & Suzy Williams at The American Dance Festival, choreographing their dance based on Suzy's movements.

In 1999, Pilobolus collaborated with Maurice Sendak and Arthur Yorinks in the production of "A Selection", a work with the Holocaust as its theme, documented in the film Last Dance. In 2004 the company was the subject of a feature profile on CBS's 60 Minutes.

In 2007 Pilobolus appeared as performers in the television broadcast of the 79th Academy Awards. Their act was performed in silhouette behind a white translucent screen, where they formed various figures at intervals during the show: first, the Oscar statue itself; then logos (or scenes) from various films: Happy Feet, Little Miss Sunshine, Snakes on a Plane, The Devil Wears Prada, and The Departed. At one point, they were introduced to the audience, wearing loose-fitting wraps. The act for Snakes on a Plane included host Ellen DeGeneres, who said afterwards, "They're naked!" Whether she was joking or serious was left to the imagination.

Following the company's appearance on the 79th Academy Awards, Pilobolus's signature shapes and shadow work were featured in 2008 on the 39th Season of Sesame Street, as well as on Late Night with Conan O'Brien and Oprah Winfrey.

In 2011, Pilobolus set a Guinness World Record when they were able to fit 26 people into a Mini Cooper.

In October 2012, Pilobolus premiered UP: The Umbrella Project, the company's second collaboration with Daniela Rus and the MIT Distributed Robotics Laboratory, at the PopTech Conference in Camden, Maine. Untrained participants wielding umbrellas fabricated with multi-colored LED lights, created a performance piece together that was projected in real time on a large screen. This Pilobolus piece, like all of the modern performance company's work over the last 42 years, was borne out of its proven method of collective creativity.

Pilobolus appeared on the December 7, 2016 episode of The Late Show with Stephen Colbert, doing holiday silhouettes to the tune of "Low Rider".

== International Collaborators Project ==
In 2007, Pilobolus established the International Collaborators Project (ICP), in which the dance company teams up with visiting artists annually to expand its unique collective choreographic process. To celebrate this inaugural event, Pilobolus Artistic Director Robby Barnett invited star Israeli director and choreographer Inbal Pinto and her artistic collaborator, actor and designer Avshalom Pollak, that same year to join the company in its studios in Connecticut.

Other ICP collaborators include musical duo Béla Fleck and Abigail Washburn; writer and illustrator, Maurice Sendak; the puppeteer, Basil Twist; Pulitzer Prize-winner, comic artist Art Spiegelman; the Grammy-winning American composer and musician Dan Zanes; singer/composer David Poe; SpongeBob SquarePants head writer Steven Banks; the Grammy-winning band OK Go; the MIT Distributed Robotics Laboratory directed by Daniela Rus; the Japanese butoh choreographer Takuya Muramatsu of the troupe Dairakudakan; WNYC's Radiolab with hosts Jad Abumrad and Robert Krulwich; the MacArthur “Genius” Award-winning juggler Michael Moschen; the Belgian-Moroccan choreographer Sidi Larbi Cherkaoui; award-winning director and choreographer, Trish Sie; master illusionists Penn & Teller; Israeli authors and filmmakers Etgar Keret and Shira Geffen; and multiplatinum songwriter/composer Alex Dezen

== Educational programming ==
Pilobolus classes and workshops use the art of collaborative choreography as a model for creative thinking in general. Pilobolus educational projects include a series of workshops for Avon Corporation in partnership with Deloitte, classes at the Wharton School of the University of Pennsylvania and at Dartmouth College's Tuck School of Business, and a program at the Babcock School at Wake Forest University. Every summer, the company offers several week-long adult workshops and runs a children's camp at its home in Washington Depot, CT. The company's youth development program, Movin’, in partnership with the Shubert Theater in New Haven, offers fully funded, month-long choreographic programs for middle school boys and girls. Based on Movin's success, Pilobolus has launched multiple programs for middle and high school students in New York City public schools.

After co-founder Jonathan Wolken died in 2010, Pilobolus established the Jonathan Wolken Education Fund to help spread the spirit of his teaching and methods.

== Pilobolus Creative Services ==
Pilobolus Creative Services provides movement design and production for commercial applications in business and advertising. PCS has made television spots for Mobil, Ford, Toyota, Opel, Hyundai, Multicentrum, BBVA, Bidvest, and Procter & Gamble – including an Emmy-Nominated piece for the NFL Network – and created live events for IBM, McKinsey, United Technologies, Dupont, Merck, and Google. PCS created and presented six acclaimed performances during the 79th Annual Academy Awards, and produced a series of original segments for the Oprah Winfrey Show and Late Night with Conan O’Brien. PCS produced two books for national distribution, Twisted Yoga and The Human Alphabet.

== Calendar and still photography ==
Beginning in 2000, Pilobolus published an annual wall calendar featuring original photography created to further explore and celebrate the company's artistic sensibility. An introductory text to the 2008 calendar noted that the company had been “experimenting with still photography since the 1980s” to address the question “How can one select individual moments from a continuum and have them retain meaning?” The introduction also noted that the group's “choreographic inquiry is driven by a fascination with images” that are, or become, “the fundamental units of our physical vocabulary.” Rather than attempting to document their live performances, the calendar photo shoots represented "a sort of annual gallery of our evolving understanding of the relationship between choreographic and photographic expression."

Almost all of the calendars, which were produced for eleven consecutive years (from 2000-2010) and again in 2012, were photographed by John Kane, the company's longtime friend and collaborator on photography projects. An exception was the 2009 Pilobolus calendar, created while the company was on tour in Israel in January 2008, in collaboration with the Israeli Consulate in New York. Photographer Robert Whitman captured Pilobolus in a variety of colorful Israeli landscapes, including the Dead Sea, Old Jaffa, markets in Jerusalem, hot springs, and the streets of Haifa.

== Shadowland ==
After its shadow theater performance on the 79th Annual Academy Awards, Pilobolus embarked on the creation of an evening-length movement-theater piece titled Shadowland. It was created in collaboration with Steven Banks, head writer for the hit Nickelodeon show “SpongeBob SquarePants,” and singer-songwriter David Poe, who wrote the score. Since its debut in 2009, Shadowland has sold over 450,000 tickets world-wide.

== Company ==
As of 2026, the Pilobolus company is composed of Connor Chaparro, Ryan Hayes, Isaac Huerta, Alexis Castro-Cruz, Anouk Otsea, and dance captain Hannah Klinkman. Renee Jaworski serves as Executive Director and Co-Artistic Director, and Matt Kent serves as Artistic Director.

== Notable dancers ==
- Gaspard Louis

== See also ==
- Momix (dance company)
- Mummenschanz (dance company)
- Zentai (costuming)
