= Lake Waramaug State Park =

State park in Connecticut, United States

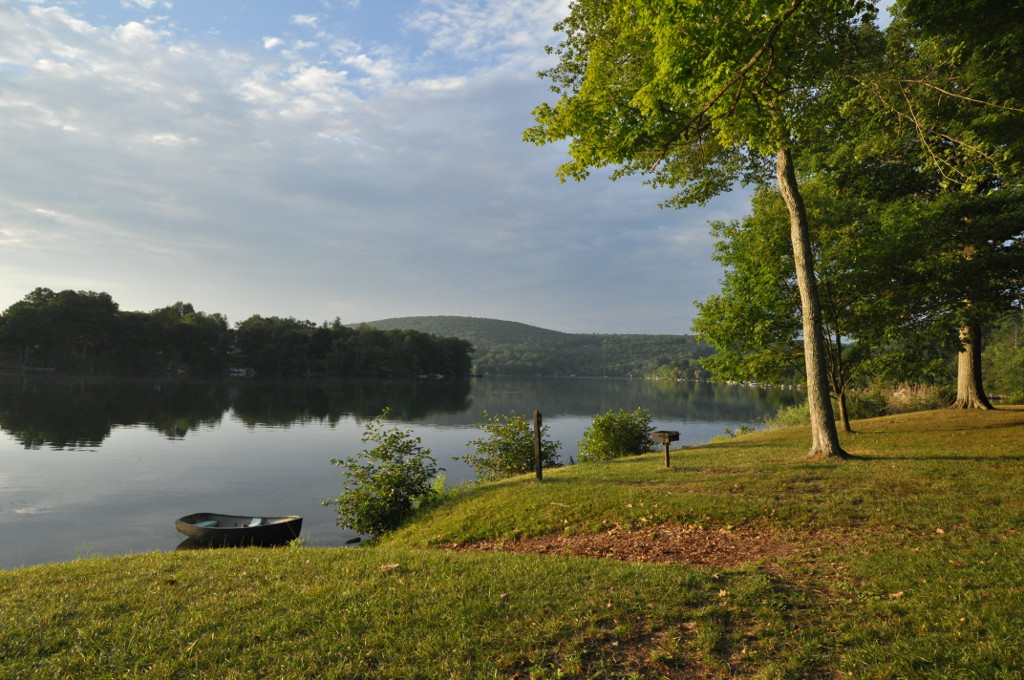
- Lake Waramaug with Mount Bushnell in the distance

- Location within Connecticut Location within the United States
- Location: Kent, Connecticut, United States
- Coordinates: 41°42′23″N 73°22′57″W
- Area: 95 acres (38 ha)
- Elevation: 692 ft (211 m)
- Established: 1920
- Administrator: Connecticut Department of Energy and Environmental Protection
- Designation: Connecticut state park
- Website: Official website

Lake Waramaug State Park is a 95-acre (38 ha) public recreation area located on the northwest shore of Lake Waramaug in the town of Kent, Litchfield County, Connecticut. The state park's first 75 acres (30 ha) were purchased by the state in 1920. The park offers swimming, fishing, picnicking, camping, and a launch for car-top boating and canoeing.
