= New Milford North Purchase =

The New Milford North Purchase is a colonial-era property transaction that took place in 1741 in Connecticut, in the United States. The purchase, which involved a large portion of present-day Litchfield County, encompassed land north of the towns of New Milford and Woodbury, extending northward to the Massachusetts state line. The transaction was organized by a group of residents from Hartford and Windsor.
