= Connecticut Siting Council =

State agency of Connecticut, United States

State agency overview
- Jurisdiction: Connecticut
- Headquarters: 10 Franklin Square New Britain, CT 06051
- State agency executive: Melanie Bachman, Executive Director
- Website: portal.ct.gov/csc

The Connecticut Siting Council is a State of Connecticut entity that has legal jurisdiction over the siting of power facilities, transmission lines, hazardous waste facilities, telecommunications towers, and other types of infrastructure. It was established in 1972 as the Power Facility Evaluation Council, as part of the Connecticut Public Utility Environmental Standards Act, and subsequently came to be called the Connecticut Siting Council, with the passage in 1981 of Connecticut Public Act 81-369, which, in addition to changing the entity's name, expanded the scope of the Council's authority and responsibilities.

The Connecticut Siting Council is often the focus of controversy because it typically deals with infrastructure installations, such as power plants, that are perceived as making undesirable neighbors—and because the Council preempts the authority of municipal zoning commissions and challenges Connecticut's long-standing tradition of home rule with respect to land-use matters.
