= Highlands of Connecticut, New Jersey, New York, and Pennsylvania =

The Highlands of Connecticut, New Jersey, New York, and Pennsylvania is a multi-state region in the northeastern United States. The region is defined by its geological features and is characterized by the largely undeveloped foothills that form the edge of the New York-New Jersey-Connecticut Tri-State Region. Formally established by the U.S. Congress in 2004, the Highlands encompass some of the last major corridors of undeveloped land along the Eastern Seaboard, and form a regional greenbelt that provides critical ecological services to the most densely populated part of the United States.

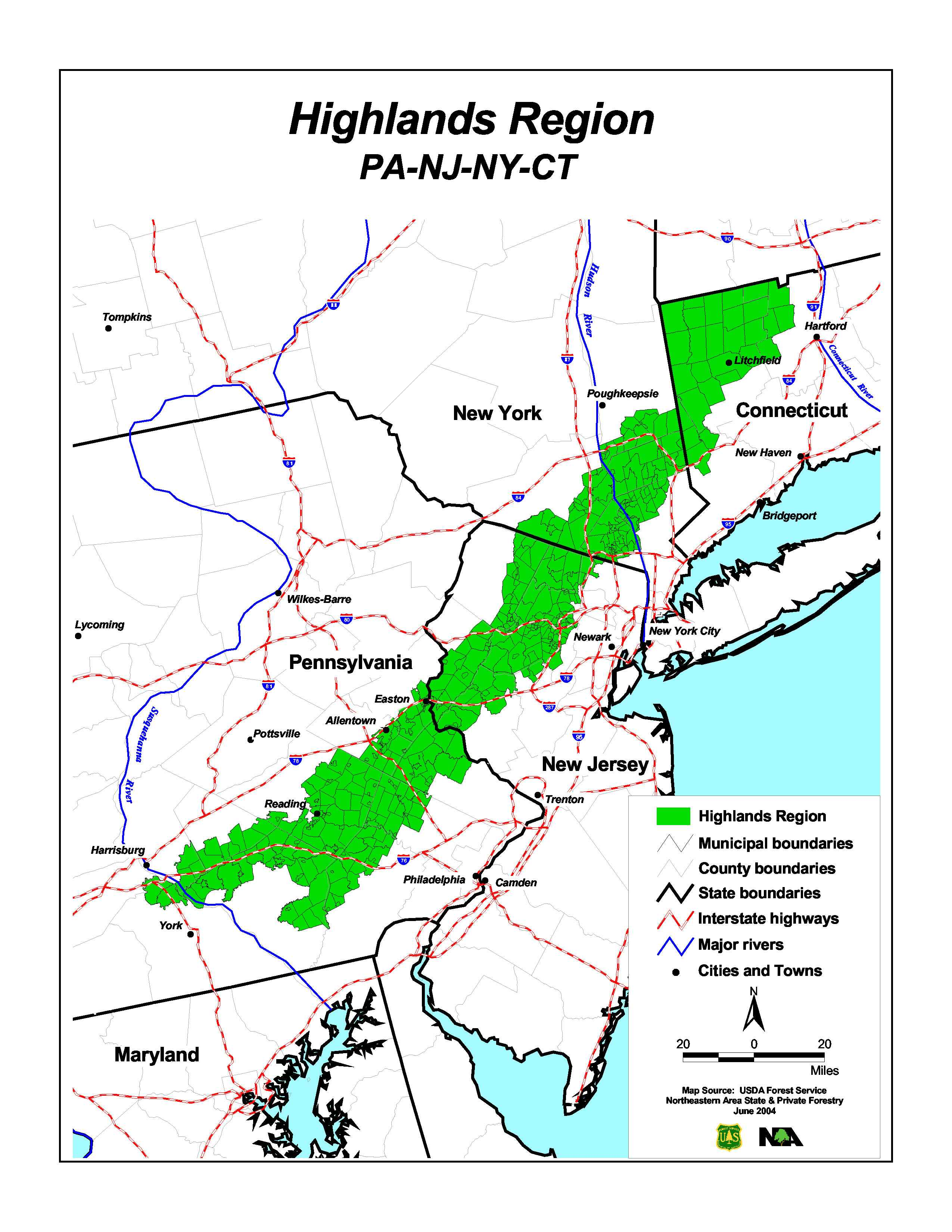

== See also ==
- Western Connecticut Highlands AVA
