= Alison Becker Chase =

Alison Becker Chase (born January 3, 1946) taught the dance class at Dartmouth that led to founding of Pilobolus Dance Theater in 1971. As a founding artistic director of Pilobolus she worked with the company from 1971 to 2006. She launched Momix with Moses Pendleton in 1980. She was a Guggenheim Fellow in 1980.

After leaving Pilobolus, she founded a new company, Apogee Arts, with a touring program called Alison Chase/Performance. Apogee was commissioned to create a site specific performance at Settlement Quarry in Stonington, Maine in summer 2009 and 2010. The formal company premiered November 19, 2010 at the Collins Center for the Arts in Orono, Maine. The company continues to perform and provides educational programming to schools in Maine.
