= Martha Clarke =

American theater director and choreographer

Martha Clarke (born June 3, 1944) is an American theater director and choreographer noted for her multidisciplinary approach to theatre, dance, and opera productions. Her best-known original work is The Garden of Earthly Delights (1984, re-imagined 2008), an exploration in theatre, dance, music and flying of the famous painting of the same name by Hieronymus Bosch. The production was honored with a Drama Desk Award for Unique Theatrical Experience, an Obie Award for Richard Peaslee's original score, and a Los Angeles Drama Critics Circle Award for choreography.

In 1990, Clarke received a MacArthur Award, better known as the Genius Grant.

Her current production, "Bughouse" is playing at the Vineyard Theatre, NYC until April 5, 2026.

== Training and early career ==
Born and raised in Pikesville, Maryland (Baltimore), she studied dance with Carol Lynn and Dale Sehnert in the preparatory program of the Peabody Conservatory. She then went to the Juilliard School of music and graduated in 1965 from the Dance program. Her most influential teachers were British choreographer Antony Tudor and music composition teacher Louis Horst. She then spent three years performing with the modern dance choreographer Anna Sokolow and the Dance Theater Workshop. She later became a founding member of Pilobolus Dance Theatre and founded a dance trio, Crowsnest (both toured internationally). Clarke continues to have a highly original career as a director/choreographer.

== Theatre, dance and opera career ==
Clarke's many original productions include The Garden of Earthly Delights (with musical score by Richard Peaslee), Vienna: Lusthaus, Miracolo d'Amore, Endangered Species, An Uncertain Hour, The Hunger Artist, Vers la Flamme, Chéri and God's Fool. She directed the premiere of Christopher Hampton's Alice's Adventures Underground at the Royal National Theatre in London. Angel Reapers (with text by Alfred Uhry) had its New York premiere at the Joyce Theater November 29 – December 11, 2011. She created the full-evening work L'altra metá del cielo in 2012 at La Scala Opera in Milan, Italy.

Her original productions have been presented at The Public Theater, Lincoln Center Theater, the Brooklyn Academy of Music, New York Theatre Workshop, the Signature Theatre Company, the Kennedy Center, La MaMa, and La Scala among others.

Mel Gussow wrote in The New York Times Magazine: "In Martha Clarke's work, theater and dance are inseparable, unified into a style of performance that lacks a name but not a dimension. Her pieces, marked by their precision and visual beauty, are performance art objects."

From June 12 to July 2, 2022, Clarke's latest multidisciplinary theatre work God's Fool was presented at La MaMa in New York City. A song cycle, God's Fool incorporates an a cappella score performed live, derived from music spanning a period of 800 years.

Clarke has choreographed for the Nederlands Dans Theater, the Joffrey Ballet, American Ballet Theatre, Rambert Dance Company, and The Martha Graham Company, among others.

Clarke has directed Mozart's The Magic Flute for the Glimmerglass Opera and the Canadian Opera Company, Cosi fan tutte for Glimmerglass, Tan Dun's Marco Polo for the Munich Biennale, the Hong-Kong Festival, and the New York City Opera, and Gluck's Orfeo and Euridice for the English National Opera and the New York City Opera.

She directed Shakespeare's A Midsummer Night's Dream for the American Repertory Theater and a music/theater work, Belle Epoque, based on the life of Toulouse-Lautrec at Lincoln Center Theater.

She has collaborated with playwrights Christopher Hampton, Richard Greenberg, Charles L. Mee, and Alfred Uhry.

While Clarke does not compose the musical scores or texts (when present) for her original works, she is engaged in all aspects of production and direction, from conception and structure to details of music, text, lighting, and costumes. Britannica Online summarizes her choreographic approach in saying that her "emotionally evocative work draws extensively on theatrical elements."

Clarke's work mostly draws inspiration from the visual arts, especially painting. In this preoccupation, Clarke can be associated with such disparate artists as Peter Sellars, Pina Bausch, and Robert Wilson. New York Times critic Michael Kimmelman wrote of her Miracolo d'Amore in 1988 that it "... can be counted among the recent opera productions, films and theatrical presentations that in one way or another emulate painting. Franco Zeffirelli, George Lucas, Pina Bausch, Andrew Lloyd Webber, Robert Wilson and Peter Sellars share with Clarke this striking characteristic: They view the performing arts as a pretext for staging visual spectaculars."

In June 2007, a version of The Garden of Earthly Delights show opened the 30th anniversary of the American Dance Festival. On November 19, 2008, the re-imagined Garden of Earthly Delights opened Off-Broadway at the Minetta Lane Theater in New York City and ran until April 5, 2009.

In 2011, Clarke created Angel Reapers, in a collaboration with Pulitzer prize-winner Alfred Uhry. It ran at the Signature Theatre Company (New York City) from February 2, 2016 - March 20, 2016. This production won two Lucille Lortel Awards for "Outstanding Alternative Theatrical Experience" and for "Outstanding Choreography". Angel Reapers also toured New England with performances at The Joyce Theater in 2011.

== Personal life ==
Clarke was married to sculptor Philip Grausman and has one son.

== Awards and honors ==
Clarke has received several awards including a MacArthur Award (1990), the Samuel H. Scripps/American Dance Festival Award for Lifetime Achievement (2010), a Dance Magazine Award (2013) and two Joe A. Callaway choreography awards (2009 and 2014) from the Stage Directors and Choreographers Foundation, the only person to have received the award twice for their choreography.

Clarke has received two grants from the Guggenheim Foundation as well as fifteen grants from the NEA. She has received the Drama Desk Award, two Obie Awards, and 1985 Los Angeles Drama Critics Circle Award. In 2016, Clarke won two Lucille Lortel Awards for Angel Reapers: one for "Outstanding Choreography" and another with collaborator Alfred Uhry for "Outstanding Alternative Theatrical Experience". In July 2019, Clarke received the Flora Roberts Award, given by the Dramatists Guild Foundation, presented to a theatre professional in recognition of distinguished work in the theatre and to encourage the continuation of that work.

Clarke is the subject of the film Martha Clarke: Light and Dark for PBS, and her Garden of Earthly Delights was filmed by the BBC.

Kaos, adapted from stories by Luigi Pirandello, received the first Tony Randall Foundation Award; and was presented at the New York Theatre Workshop in 2006.

In 2007, the National Endowment for the Arts gave a grant for the remounting of The Garden of Earthly Delights under a program dedicated to the remounting of American masterworks.
