= Lake Waramaug =

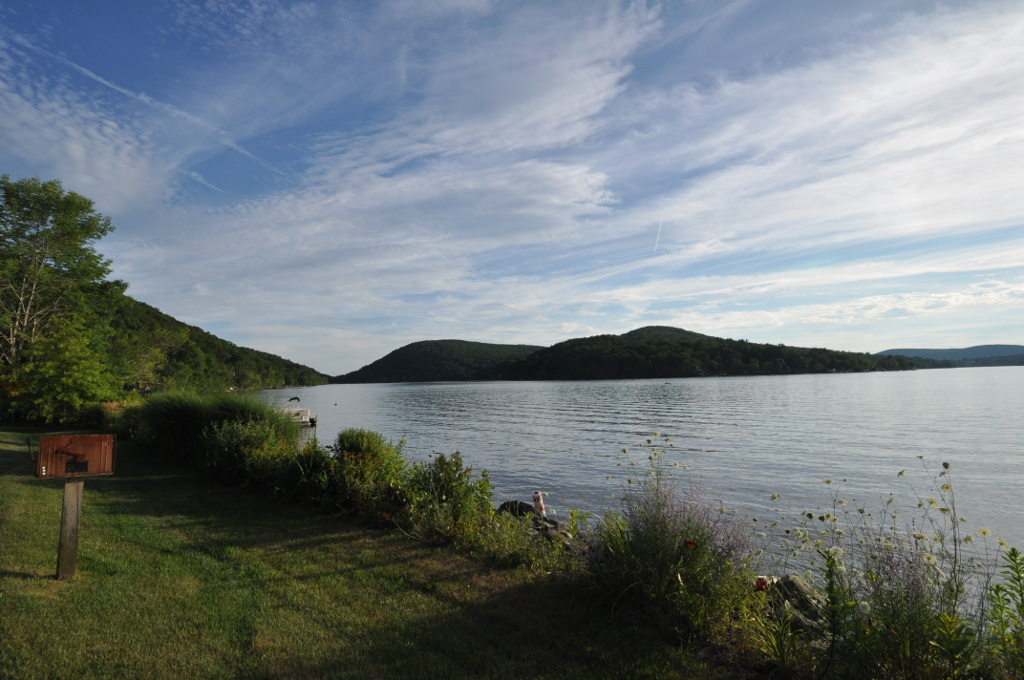
- Lake Waramaug with Mount Bushnell across the water

- Location in Connecticut
- Location: Warren & Washington, Connecticut
- Coordinates: 41°41′52″N 73°21′44″W
- Type: Natural lake
- Etymology: Named after Chief Waramaug
- Primary inflows: Sucker Brook (Lake Waramaug Brook), groundwater
- Primary outflows: East Aspetuck River
- Max. length: 2.4 miles (3.9 km)
- Max. width: 1.75 miles (2.82 km)
- Surface area: 656 acres (265 ha)
- Average depth: 22.1 feet (6.7 m)
- Max. depth: 40 feet (12 m)
- Residence time: 300 days
- Surface elevation: 692 feet (211 m)

Interactive map of Lake Waramaug

Lake Waramaug is a 656-acre (265 ha) lake occupying parts of the towns of Kent, Warren and Washington in Litchfield County, Connecticut, United States, approximately 24 miles (39 km) north of Danbury. The lake is named after Chief Waramaug, who wintered in the area surrounding Lake Waramaug.

== Description ==
Although natural in origin, the surface elevation of the lake has been raised by a small concrete and masonry dam. The surface area of the lake is approximately 656 acres (2.7 km^{2}). The lake has a maximum depth of 40 feet (12 m), an average depth of 22 feet (7 m), and contains approximately 4.8 billion US gallons (18,000,000 m^{3}) of water. The lake is fed by Sucker Brook (Lake Waramaug Brook), numerous small streams, and groundwater that enters through the lake bottom. Drainage from Waramaug Lake flows southward into the East Aspetuck River.

The bottom materials on steep side slopes of the lake consist primarily of gravel, cobbles, and boulders, whereas the flatter areas consist primarily of sand, mud, and organic muck. The watershed of the lake is 14.4 square miles (9,216 acres (37 km^{2})). Approximately 74 percent (6,820 acres (28 km^{2})) of the watershed is forested. Wetlands and water bodies comprise approximately 10 percent (922 acres (3.7 km^{2})) of the watershed, while the remaining 16 percent (1,474 acres (6 km^{2})) of the area is low-density residential housing and commercial and agricultural land.

The shoreline development of Lake Waramaug is moderate and includes houses, seasonal cottages, and boat houses, with few commercial establishments. Public access to the lake is available only within Lake Waramaug State Park, which is located at the northwestern end of the lake. Outside park boundaries, the shoreline is privately owned . The park can be reached by taking Route 45 north from Route 202 and turning west onto North Shore Road.

An aquatic survey of Waramaug Lake was published in 1987. The survey found aquatic vegetation to be relatively sparse, with only localized growths of emergent and submergent species along the shorelines and shallows of the lake. Aquatic species observed include Robbins pondweed (Potamogeton robbinsii), coontail (Ceratophyllum demersum), white-water lily (Nymphaea odorata), narrow-leaved arrowhead (Sagittaria graminea), yellow-pond lily (Nuphar variegatum), spike rush (Eleocharis sp.), bushy pondweed (Najas flexilis), leafy pondweed (Potamogeton foliosus) and pondweed (Potamogeton gramineus).

The fish species observed in Waramaug Lake include largemouth, smallmouth and calico bass; lake and rainbow trout; yellow and white perch; pickerel, alewives, sunfish, and bullheads.

== Town of Washington improvements ==
In 2004, the Town of Washington entered into an agreement with the Connecticut Department of Environmental Protection to reconstruct and expand the town's boat launch at Lake Waramaug, and to permit 20 launchings per day by non-residents in exchange for the DEP agreeing not to construct a new boat launch at Lake Waramaug State Park. The agreement limits motor boat traffic on the lake, and requires inspection of all boats for invasive aquatic plant species prior to launching. Plans for the new boat launch were developed in 2006, and the new facility was opened in 2008. In 2010, the Town of Washington separately completed major reconstruction of the adjacent, Hitherto Forlorn Town Beach at Lake Waramaug, which may be used only by Washington residents and their guests. New parking areas were constructed, new fencing and landscaping were installed, and a new boathouse with a caretaker's apartment was constructed.

== In popular culture ==
"Lake Waramaug" is a song by goth/synth rock band Deadsy. It was originally the first song on the band's 1996 debut eponymous album, which was delayed and eventually released in 2002 as Commencement (the song had since been moved to track 5). The lyrics describe founding band member and principal songwriter Elijah Blue Allman's experiences there during his university years.

The Connecticut Public Schools Rowing Association hosts the youth rowing state championship here every year in May as well, with towns such as Glastonbury, East Lyme, Guilford, Stonington, Lyme-Old Lyme, and Lewis Mills participating.
