= Moses Pendleton =

American choreographer

Moses Pendleton (born March 28, 1949) is a choreographer, dancer and the artistic director of MOMIX. MOMIX is a dance company that he formed in 1981 as an offshoot of the Pilobolus, which he had co-founded while a senior at Dartmouth College in 1971. He remained a full-time member with the company until 1980. He choreographs dance sculptures that bring together acrobatics, gymnastics, mime, props, and film.

== Early years ==
Born and raised on a dairy farm in Lyndonville, Vermont. Pendleton exhibited Holstein Friesians at the Caledonia County Fair.

"Robbie" attended high school at Lyndon Institute in Lyndon Center, Vermont, graduating in 1967. Lyndon Institute is a boarding school that also serves as the local high school. He was active in the classics, arts, and athletics especially skiing.

He attended Dartmouth College, graduating in 1971 with a BA in English Literature. In that same year he co-founded Pilobolus, which won acclaim for its blend of acrobatics, body sculpture, and humor. Pierre Cardin presented the group on Broadway in 1977. Pendleton left the company to start MOMIX four years later.

== MOMIX ==
Pendleton performed a solo dance called "MOMIX" with Pilobolus at the 1980 Winter Olympics at Lake Placid. The following year MOMIX became the name of the company he founded with Alison Becker Chase.

Over the past 40 years MOMIX repertoire has included full-evening works such as Passion, with a score by Peter Gabriel; In Orbit; Baseball; Opus Cactus; Lunar Sea; MOMIX: Remix; Botanica; Alchemy and the company's latest creation, Alice.

== Inspiration and ideology ==
Pendleton takes much of his inspiration for his work from the natural world, plants, animals and minerals. On stage, portrays resemble sunflowers and marigolds. Pendleton states, "we're less of a dance company than a physical, visual theater, using props and costumes to create fascinating pictures."

== Choreography and performance ==
Pendleton has been active as a choreographer and a performer for other companies.

- 1979 - choreographed and performed in the "Integrale Erik Satie" staged by the Paris Opera Ballet, including a revival of the 1924 Dadaist ballet "Relache."
- 1980 - choreographed the closing ceremonies for the 1980 Winter Olympics at Lake Placid.
- 1980 - remounts "Relache" for the Joffrey Ballet in New York
- 1982 - creates the role of the Fool for Yuri Lyubimov's production of Mussorgsky's "Khovanshchina" at Milan's La Scala
- 1982 - stages and performs in the Deutsche Opera's production of "Tutuguri", based on the writings of Antonin Artaud, in Berlin.
- 1985 - choreographs Stravinsky's "Pulcinella" for the Ballet de Nancy
- 1987 - choreographs Rameau's "Platee" for the Spoleto Festival USA
- 1988 - supplies choreographic "mise-en-scene" for a revival of Cocteau's "Les Maries de la Tour Eiffel" for the inauguration of the Florence Gould Hall at the Alliance Francaise in New York
- 1989 - choreographs "AccorDION" for the Vorbuhne-Zurich Theatre
- 1991 - "Passion" with MOMIX
- 1993 - contributes the choreography for Lina Wertmüller's production of "Carmen" with the Munich State Opera
- 1994 - "Baseball" with MOMIX
- 1997 - "Sputnik" with MOMIX
- 2000 - choreographs (with Danny Ezralow and David Parsons) "Aeros" with the Romanian Olympic gymnastics team
- 2002 - "Opus Cactus" with MOMIX
- 2004 - choreographs 12 weeks of Italian RAI-TV’s number-one-rated live variety show, Fiorello
- 2005 - "Lunar Sea" with MOMIX
- 2008 - choreographs "Picarte" for Diana Vishneva of the Kirov Ballet
- 2008 - "F.L.O.W." for Diana Vishneva
- 2008 - Choreographs for Mercedes Benz at Frankfurt Auto Show
- 2009 - "Botanica" with MOMIX
- 2013 - "Alchemy" with MOMIX
- 2013 - Choreographs "Doves of Peace" for Sochi Olympics opening ceremony
- 2015 - "Viva Momix Forever" with MOMIX in honor of 35th Anniversary Season
- 2015 - Choreographs for Dubai National Day
- 2018 - Choreographs for Pirelli Calendar Event in NYC
- 2019 - "Alice" with MOMIX
- 2020 - "MOMIX 40" Celebration of 40th Anniversary
- 2026 - "Botanica - Season 2" - A revival of the original work from 2009

== Film and television ==
- 1970s - participation in several "Dance in America" and "Great Performances" PBS specials with Pilobolus
- 1970s - appearances on "To Tell the Truth," "The Tonight Show," and "Sesame Street"
- 1982 - "Moses Pendleton Presents Moses Pendleton" for ABC Arts, winner of a CINE Golden Eagle award
- 1984 - Julian Lennon's "Too Late for Goodbyes" directed by Sam Peckinpah
- 1989 - choreography for Prince's "Batdance" music video for the movie "Batman"
- 1991 - choreography appears in the film "FXII"
- 1991 - co-stars with Charles Dutoit in the Emmy Award winning Rhombus Media film of Mussorgsky's "Pictures at an Exhibition" with the Montreal Symphony Orchestra.
- 1990s - choreographs rock videos for the bands White Lion and Shadowfax, and for singer Cathy Dennis.
- 1990s - directs numerous special programs for Antenne ll in France and RAI Television in Italy
- 1993 - "Carmen" for Munich State Opera
- 1994 - contributes to the 3D IMAX film "Imagine" released at IMAX theaters worldwide
- 2003 - "White Widow," danced by Emily Patterson and excerpted from MOMIX's In Orbit show, is included in the Robert Altman film The Company
- 2004 - choreographs 12 weeks of Italian RAI-TV’s number-one-rated live variety show, Fiorello

== Awards and distinctions ==
- 1972 - with Pilobolus, recipient of the Scotsman Award at the Edinburgh Festival
- 1975 - with Pilobolus, recipient of the Berlin Critics Prize
- 1977 - appointed a Guggenheim Fellow
- 1994 - recipient of the Gold Medal of the Arena di Verona Festival as director of MOMIX
- 1998 - recipient of the Connecticut Commission on the Arts' Governor's Award.
- 1999 - recipient of the Positano Choreographic Award
- 2002 - recipient of the American Choreography Award (with Daniel Parsons and Daniel Ezralow) from the Academy of Dance on Film for Outstanding Achievement in Television, Variety or Special (for "Aeros: Illusion of Flight")
- 2010 - recipient of an honorary Doctorate of Fine Arts from the University of the Arts in Philadelphia and keynote speaker at Commencement ceremonies
- 2012 - appointed Accademico of the Accademia Filarmonica Romana (established 1821), the first choreographer ever to receive such a distinction
- 2021 - recipient of an honorary Doctorate from Dartmouth College in a virtual ceremony held in May
- 2025 - recipient of the Richard Brettell Award in the Arts from the University of Texas at Dallas.
- 2026 - recipient of an Honorary Doctorate of Arts from Boston Conservatory at Berklee

== Other projects ==
An avid photographer, Pendleton's work has been exhibited in London, Milan, Montreal, Aspen, and Rome. Pendleton is the subject of the book Salto di Gravità by Lisavetta Scarbi (in Italian, 1999). Pendleton was a 1998 recipient of the Connecticut Commission on the Arts' Governor's Award.

== Personal life ==
Pendleton's life partner is Cynthia Quinn, with whom he manages MOMIX.

== Sources ==
- Chamber Dance Company (includes photo)
- PBS Documentary Series (includes video)
