= Robby Barnett =

American dancer

Robby Barnett is one of the founders of the dance company Pilobolus. He and other students in a dance class at Dartmouth College (1971) started using a unique weight-sharing approach to partnering, what Robby called four men twisted together like proteins. This hybrid of dance and gymnastics spurred up many ideas for Robby and the other members of the new company known as Pilobolus. Barnett graduated from Dartmouth in 1972.

In an interview with Zachary Whittenburg, Mr. Barnett stated that Pilobolus wants to bring in artists rather than solely sticking to dancers. They wanted to add a range of different artists and art styles to what makes Pilobolus. He said the group was trying to see if their theories would translate. The group's goal was to try to bring other forms of art into dance. Not in the essence where they wanted some visual artist to draw a picture to be used on stage but to implement new ideas. a few examples of the collaborating parties are graphic novelist Art Spiegelman and puppeteer Basil Twist.

Robby Barnett is on the Advisory Committee of American Dance Festival.
