= George Carnegie Palmer =

American architect (1861–1934)

- Born: December 20, 1861; New York City, New York, US
- Died: February 29, 1934 (aged 72); Morristown, New Jersey, US
- Education: Columbia University
- Occupation: Architect
- Partner(s): Henry Hornbostel; Samuel E. Plonsky; Sullivan W. Jones; George Edward Wood
- Practice: Palmer and Plonsky; Palmer & Hornbostel; Palmer, Hornbostel and Jones; Wood, Palmer & Hornbostel; Wood & Palmer; Frederick Clarke Withers

George Carnegie Palmer (December 20, 1861 – February 29, 1934), was an American architect who specialized in designing Beaux Arts style civic and academic buildings in the United States. He is best known for his work with the architect Henry F. Hornbostel. By 1904, Palmer & Hornbostel ranked "among the leading architects in the United States."

Palmer studied architecture at Columbia University before working for architect Frederick Clarke Withers as a general superintendent for the construction of the Chapel of the Good Shepherd and other structures on Blackwell Island. He then formed the firm Wood and Palmer, Architects in New York City with a college classmate. Hornbostel became a partner in Wood, Palmer & Hornbostel in 1897, renamed Palmer & Hornbostel in 1900.

Palmer designed Delta Psi, Alpha chapter house for his college fraternity in 1898; this property is still in use and is listed on the National Register of Historic Places. Palmer also designed several mansions for wealthy clients in New York City, Connecticut, and New Jersey. In 1904, Palmer & Hornbostel won a competition to design the 35-acre campus of Carnegie Technical Schools (now Carnegie Mellon University). The duo also designed the Brooklyn Bridge Terminal Station, the Williamsburg Bridge, and the Queensboro Bridge in New York City and the High Level Bridge in Fairmont, West Virginia; the latter is on the National Register of Historic Places. In 1907, they designed the New York State Education Building in Albany, New York

Between 1908 and 1919, his firm was called Palmer, Hornbostel and Jones and specialized in university and government buildings. A stand-out of this era is the Beaux Arts style Oakland City Hall in California which is listed on the National Register of Historic Places. Other important projects by Palmer in the early 20th century include the Hartford City Hall, the Pittsburgh City-County Building, the campus and buildings for Emory College, and dormitory and fraternity houses for Northwestern University.

== Early life ==
Palmer was born in New York City on December 20, 1861, and grew up in the Borough of Manhattan on Madison Avenue. He was the son of Sarah Parker and Nicholas F. Palmer, a wealthy banker. He attended Columbia University, graduating with a degree in architecture in 1883. While at Columbia, he was a member of the Fraternity of Delta Psi (St. Anthony Hall).

== Career ==
In 1888 and 1889, Palmer worked for architect Frederick Clarke Withers as a general superintendent for the construction of the Chapel of the Good Shepherd and other structures on Blackwell Island. However, Palmer would form and reorganize his own partnerships throughout his career. Palmer was a member of the Architectural League of New York from 1895 to 1934.

=== Early career ===
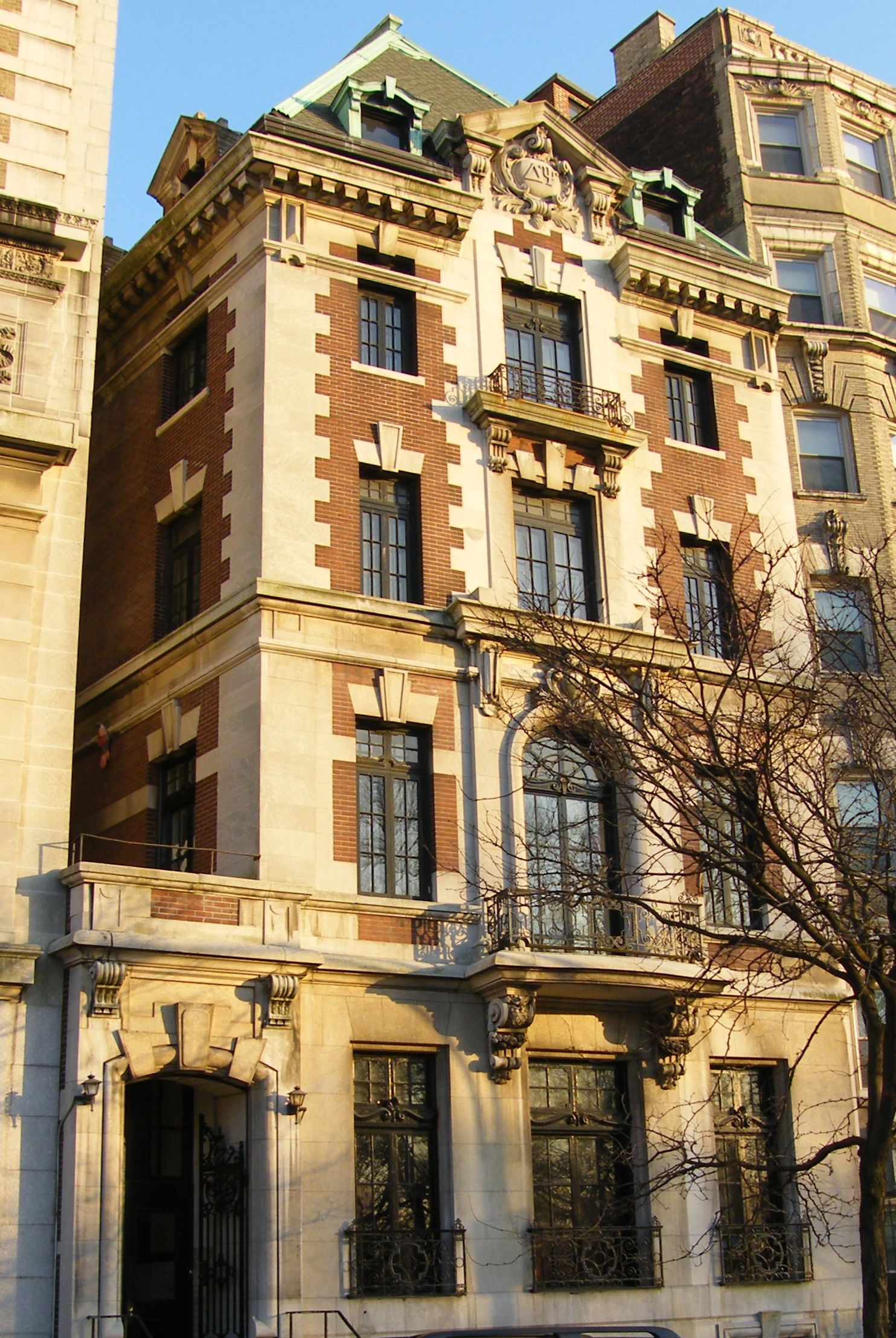
Delta Psi, Alpha Chapter building

In 1890, Palmer established the firm of Wood and Palmer, Architects in New York City with George Edward Wood, another graduate of Columbia University and a native New Yorker. Henry F. Hornbostel worked for Wood and Palmer after graduating from Columbia University in 1891. However, he left to attend the École des Beaux-Arts in France after two years.

In 1897, Hornbostel returned from France and joined the firm that became Wood, Palmer and Hornbostel. In this early phase of their career, the firm designed several mansions in New York City.

In 1898, Palmer and Hornbostel designed a Beaux Arts and French Renaissance revival style house for the Columbia chapter of the Fraternity of Delta Psi (St. Anthony Hall). Today, it is listed on the National Register of Historic Places as Delta Psi, Alpha Chapter building. It is also an architecturally significant building in the Broadway-Riverside Drive Historic District.

=== Palmer & Hornbostel ===
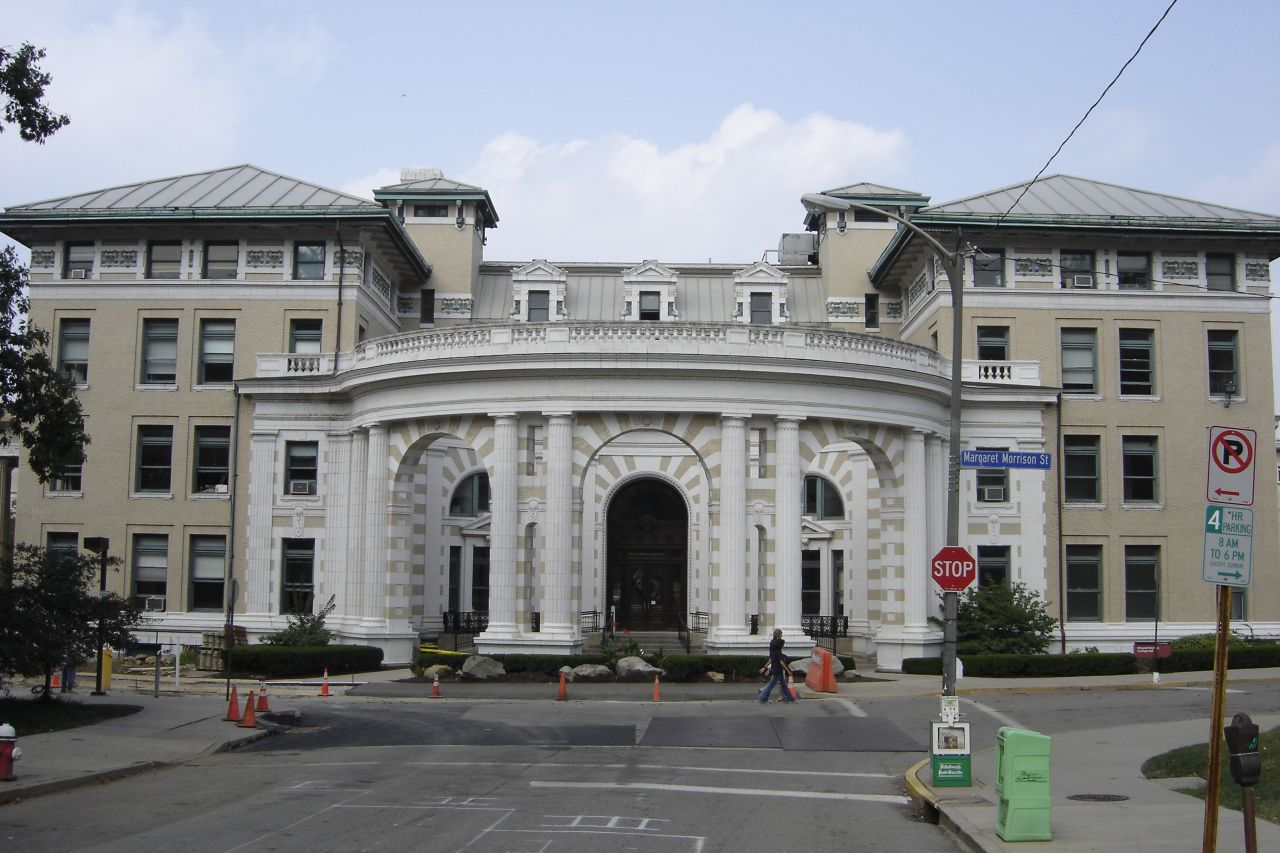
Margaret Morrison Carnegie College

Around 1900, Wood left the practice and the firm changed its name to Palmer & Hornbostel, Architects. They operated at both 63 William Street, New York City and Pittsburgh, Pennsylvania, c. 1899 through 1909. In 1901, Palmer & Hornbostel designed new buildings for the Steinway & Sons factory.

In 1904, Palmer won a competition held by the Committee of Carnegie Technical Schools (later Carnegie Mellon University) to design its campus. The project covered an area of 35 acres (14 ha) had a budget of $5,000,000 ($162,851,852 in 2022), with the architects commission being 5%. Warren P. Laird, head of architecture at the University of Pennsylvania and advisory architect to the committee, said:

The buildings are treated with a simple yet effective use of brick and terra cotta. They are so designed and massed as to be beautiful, while expressing, each in its own way, the purpose for which it is intended. The architect has been very successful in securing to the highest degree practical efficiency in his plans without sacrifice of that character which is usually called the artistic.

Although Hornbostel is frequently credited with all of the work on the Carnegie Technical School, reports in the newspaper indicate that Palmer was on site working on the campus layout and was also the one meeting with the school's committee. Because of the hilly nature of the proposed campus, Palmer said:

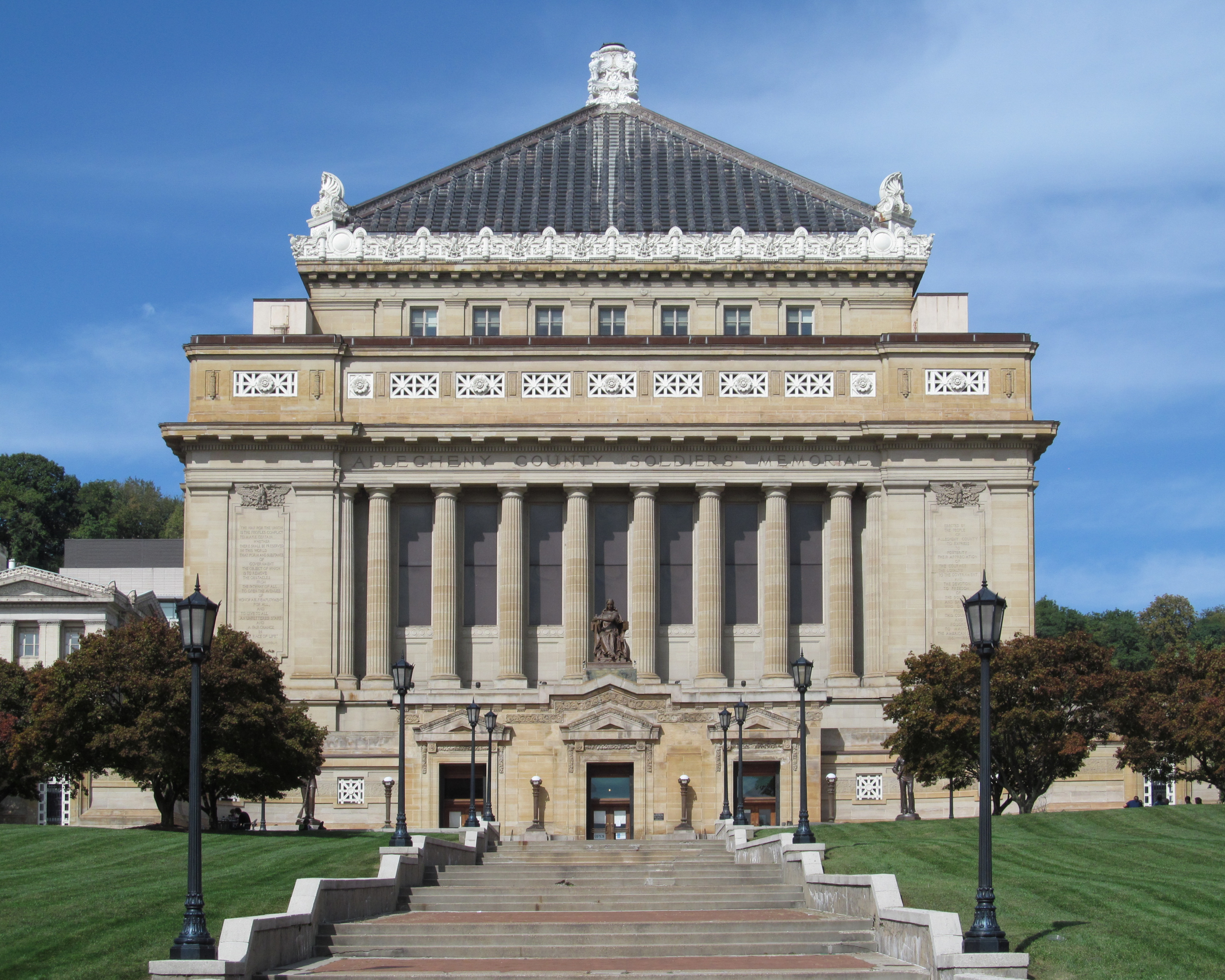
Soldiers and Sailors Memorial Hall and Museum

It was not the exterior of the buildings that we found the hard task, but in the arranging of the area for the various buildings, so as to obtain the best results. We have mapped out the general ground plan for the buildings, according to the floor area required.

In New York City, they worked on the Flatbush Unitarian Church (1903), the Brooklyn Bridge Terminal Station (before 1904), the Williamsburg Bridge (1905), and the Queensboro Bridge (1906). They designed the Soldiers and Sailors Memorial Hall and Museum in Pittsburgh in 1906. In 1907, Palmer & Hornbostel also designed a stadium for Columbia University; however, the stadium was never built because of funding problems.

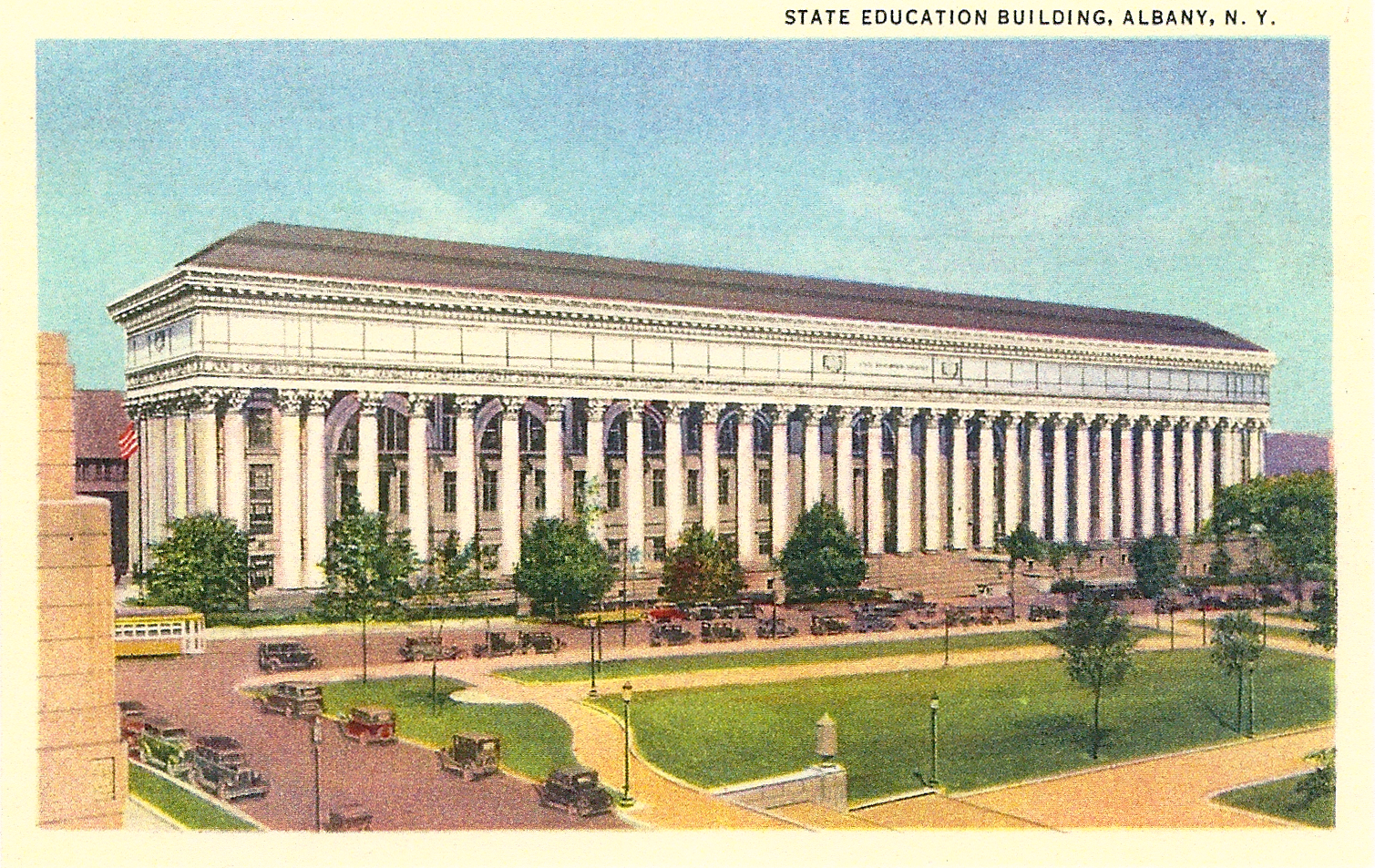
New York State Education Building

In 1907, Palmer & Hornbostel designed the New York State Education Building in Albany, gaining the contract by winning another design competition. Based on the Mausoleum at Halicarnassus, the education building features 60 feet (18 m) tall steel columns covered in marble with terra cotta Corinthian capitals. Palmer & Hornbostel used steel for fire safety and to enable its size and height. The New York Times said, "Imagine a Greek temple with electric elevators".

Thaw Hall, University of Pittsburgh

=== Palmer, Hornbostel and Jones ===
Between 1908 and 1919, Palmer and Hornbostel joined with the architect Sullivan W. Jones to form Palmer, Hornbostel and Jones, Architects. This firm operated in Albany, New York; Atlanta, Georgia; New York City; and Oakland, California and specialized in university and governmental buildings. An alumnus of the Massachusetts Institute of Technology, Jones had been the chief draftsman of Palmer & Hornbostel when they worked on the Carnegie Technical School project.

In 1909, the firm was hired to design the campus of the University of Pittsburgh. However, only five buildings of their "Acropolis Plan" were built before the university ran out of funding.

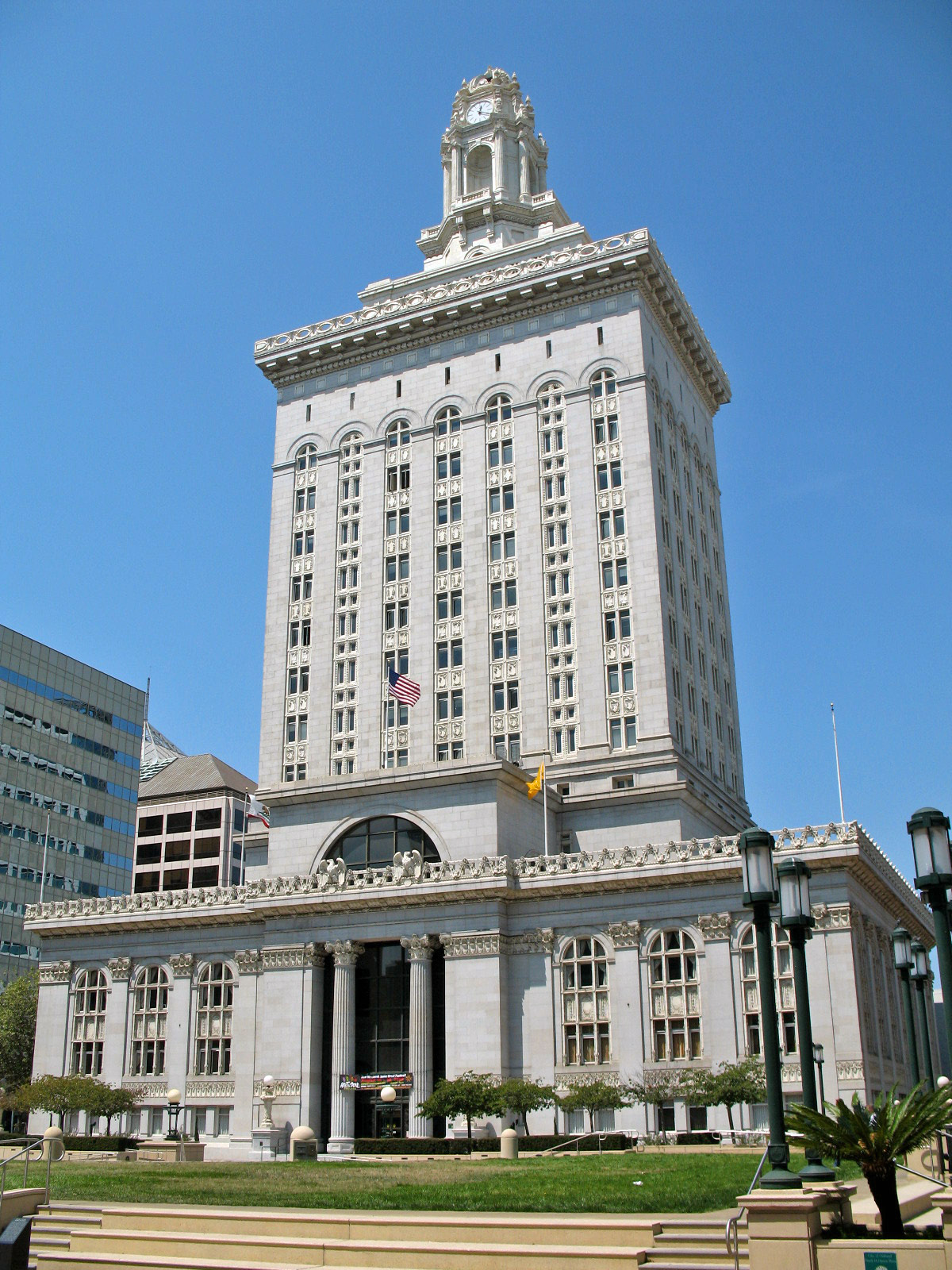
Oakland City Hall

The firm designed the Oakland City Hall for Oakland, California (1914), Hartford City Hall for Hartford, Connecticut (1915), City Hall and Courthouse for Wilmington, Delaware (1917), and Pittsburgh City-County Building (1917). The latter was designed in collaboration with the architect Edward Brown Lee who was employed by the firm. They received a contract for the Oakland City Hall through a national design contest and decorated the granite building with terra cotta representations of California's crops. When it was built, it was the first high-rise government office building in the United States. The Beaux Arts style Oakland City Hall is now listed on the National Register of Historic Places.

They also laid out the campus and designed buildings for Emory University in Atlanta from 1914 to 1919, as well as dormitory and fraternity houses for Northwestern University in Chicago, Illinois from 1915 to 1918. With the outbreak of World War I, Jones left to become the supervising architect for the Naval Operating Base in Norfolk, Virginia. After the war, Jones became state architect for New York and did not return to their practice. In 1918, the fifty-year-old Hornbostel headed to France to serve as a major in the Army's gas defense department.

=== Return of Palmer & Hornbostel ===
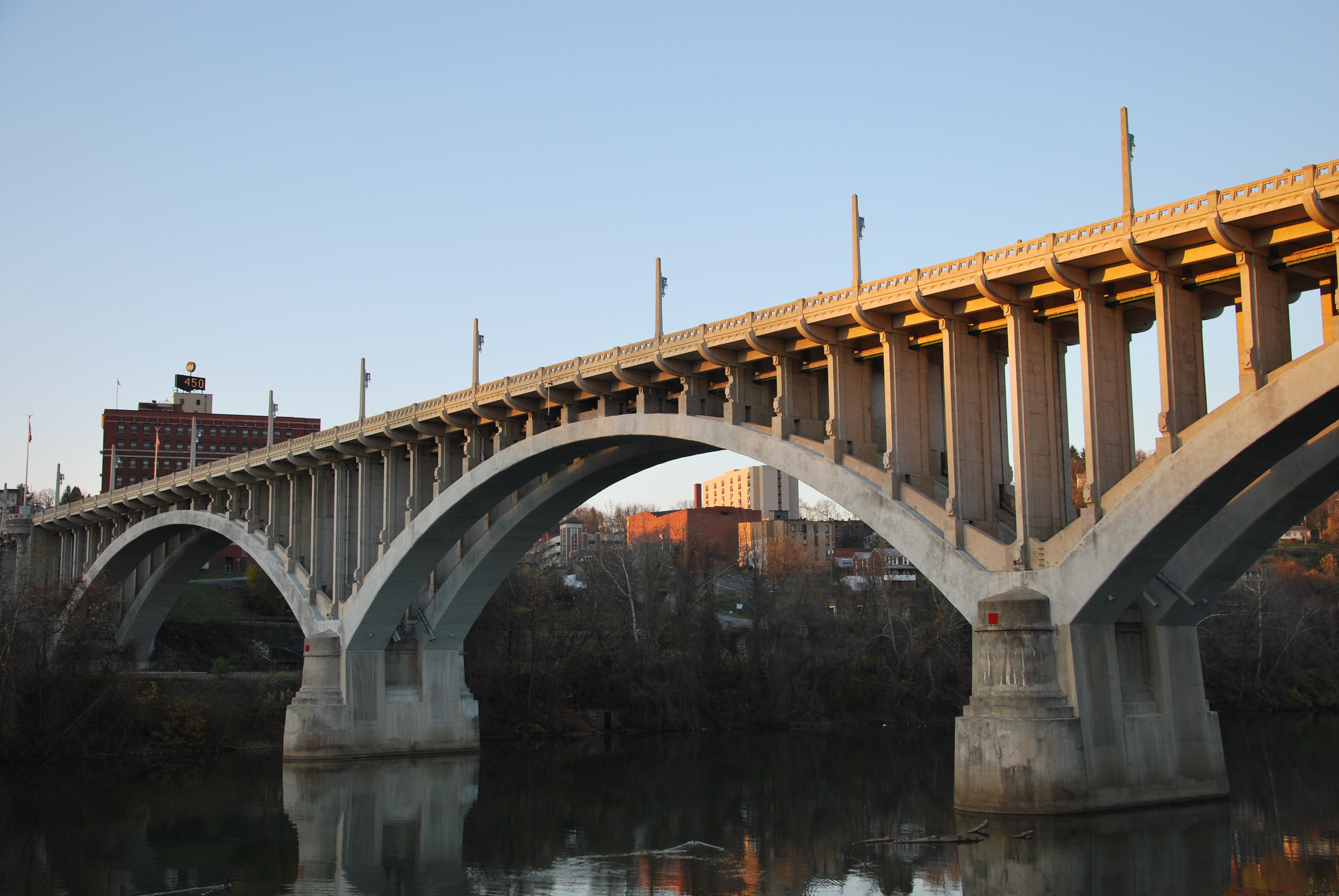
High Level Bridge (aka Robert H. Mollohan-Jefferson Street Bridge)

When Jones left the firm, its name reverted to Palmer & Hornbostel. This name stayed in place from around 1918 to 1922. Hornbostel initially retained a home in New York but moved to Pittsburgh around 1921 because of frequent projects in that city.

Between 1918 and 1921, Palmer & Hornbostel were consultants to the Concrete Steel Engineering Company for the design of High Level Bridge in Fairmont, West Virginia. This project was dubbed the "million dollar bridge" when it exceeded pre-bid estimates of $400,000 ($8,561,947 in today's money). The bridge is 1,320 feet (400 m) long and has three reinforced concrete arches and light fixtures with mouth-blown glass shades. The bridge is listed on the National Register of Historic Places as the Robert H. Mollohan-Jefferson Street Bridge.

=== Palmer and Plonsky ===
Starting in 1923, Palmer was a partner in the firm Palmer and Plonsky, Architects in Manhattan, New York City with architect Samuel E. Plonsky. Plonsky had been an unnamed partner in both Palmer, Hornbostel and Jones and Palmer & Hornbostel, working there by the mid-1910s. A modern architectural historian notes, "At a time when white Anglo-Saxon Protestant men controlled virtually all of the premier architectural firms in New York, it is likely that Plonsky long remained an uncredited partner because he was a Jew of Russian-Polish heritage."

One of Palmer and Plonsky's projects was a three-story nurses' home for the Morristown Memorial Hospital in Morristown, New Jersey in 1922. They also designed a seven-story garage for C. G. Taylor & Co. for the Columbus Circle District in New York City.

Palmer remained with this firm until his death.

== Projects ==
Following is a selected list of Palmer's projects:

| Building | Date | Location | Architect | Reference |
|---|---|---|---|---|
| Delta Psi, Alpha chapter building | 1889 | 434 Riverside Drive; New York City, New York | Palmer & Hornbostel | |
| Residence | 1899 | 1 East 73rd Street; New York City, New York | Palmer & Hornbostel | |
| Residence | 1901 | 18 East 54th Street; New York City, New York | Palmer & Hornbostel | |
| Steinway & Sons buildings | 1901 | Steinway Village; New York City, New York | Palmer & Hornbostel | |
| Pupine residence | 1902 | Norfolk, Connecticut | Palmer & Hornbostel | |
| Brooklyn Bridge Terminal Station | Before 1904 | Brooklyn, New York City, New York | Palmer & Hornbostel | (Note: Building no longer exists.) |
| Mrs. J. J. Knox residence | Before 1904 | Sea Bright, New Jersey | Palmer & Hornbostel | |
| Carnegie Technical Schools Master Plan | 1904, 1906, 1911 | Carnegie Mellon University; Pittsburgh, Pennsylvania | Palmer & Hornbostel | |
| Williamsburg Bridge | 1905 | New York City, New York | Palmer & Hornbostel | |
| First Presbyterian Church Chapel and Parish House | 1905 | 320 6th Avenue; Pittsburgh, Pennsylvania | Palmer & Hornbostel | |
| School of Applied Industries Hall (aka Porter Hall), Carnegie Technical Schools | 1905 | 4815 Frew Street; Carnegie Mellon University; Pittsburgh, Pennsylvania | Palmer & Hornbostel | |
| Physical Plant/Power House, Carnegie Technical Schools | 1905–06 | Carnegie Mellon University; Pittsburgh, Pennsylvania | Palmer & Hornbostel | |
| Margaret Morrison Carnegie College | 1905–07 | 5001 Margaret Morrison; Carnegie Mellon University; Pittsburgh, Pennsylvania | Palmer & Hornbostel | |
| School of Applied Industries (aka Baker Hall), Carnegie Technical Schools | 1906 | 4824 Frew Street; Carnegie Mellon University; Pittsburgh, Pennsylvania | Palmer & Hornbostel | |
| Blackwell Island Bridge (aka Queensboro Bridge) | 1906 | New York City, New York | Palmer & Hornbostel | |
| Driftwood Manor (J. G. Robin residence) | 1906–07 | Wading River, New York | Palmer & Hornbostel | (Note: House was demolished in 1980.) |
| Administration Building, Carnegie Technical Schools | 1906 | Frew Street; Carnegie Mellon University; Pittsburgh, Pennsylvania | Palmer & Hornbostel | |
| Soldiers and Sailors Memorial Hall and Museum | 1906–1911 | Fifth Avenue; Pittsburgh, Pennsylvania | Palmer & Hornbostel | |
| Alpha Delta Phi Club | 1907 | 138 West 44th Street; New York City, New York | Palmer & Hornbostel; Louis Brown | |
| Flatbush Unitarian Church | 1907 | Beverly Road and East 19th Street; Brooklyn, New York City, New York | Palmer & Hornbostel | |
| Thaw Hall | 1909 | 4015 O’Hara Street; University of Pittsburgh; Pittsburgh, Pennsylvania | Palmer & Hornbostel | |
| State Hall | 1909 | University of Pittsburgh; Pittsburgh, Pennsylvania | Palmer & Hornbostel | |
| Holy Rosary Parochial School | 1910 | Kelly Street and Lang Avenue; Homewood, Pennsylvania | Palmer & Hornbostel | (Note: The building was destroyed by fire.) |
| Beautiful Shore (William H. Moffitt residence) | 1911 | South Country Road; Islip, New York | Palmer & Hornbostel | |
| Pennsylvania Hall | 1911 | University of Pittsburgh; Pittsburgh, Pennsylvania | Palmer & Hornbostel | |
| School of Dentistry | 1911 | University of Pittsburgh; Pittsburgh, Pennsylvania | Palmer & Hornbostel | |
| Gymnasium, Stadium, and Athletic Field | 1911 | University of Pittsburgh; Pittsburgh, Pennsylvania | Palmer & Hornbostel | |
| Fanny Edel Falk Memorial, Temple Rodef Shalom | 1912 | 4905 Fifth Avenue; Pittsburgh, Pennsylvania | Palmer & Hornbostel | |
| New York State Education Building | 1912 | 89 Washington Avenue; Albany, New York | Palmer & Hornbostel; Rafael Guastavino | |
| Nathaniel Spear residence | 1912–13 | 4321 Northumberland Street; Pittsburgh, Pennsylvania | Palmer & Hornbostel; Edward Brown Lee | |
| Hotel Bossert (addition) | 1913 | 98 Montague Street; Brooklyn, New York City, New York | Palmer, Hornbostel, and Jones; Rafael Guastavino | |
| Lindgren House | 1913–1914 | 2309 Sheridan Road; Northwestern University; Evanston, Illinois | Palmer, Hornbostel, and Jones | |
| Foster House | 1913–1914 | 2303 Sheridan Road; Northwestern University; Evanston, Illinois | Palmer, Hornbostel and Jones | |
| Beta Theta Pi House (aka GREEN House) | 1913–1914 | 2349 Sheridan Road; Northwestern University; Evanston, Illinois | Palmer, Hornbostel and Jones | |
| Phi Kappa Psi House | 1913–1914 | 2247 Sheridan Road; Northwestern University; Evanston, Illinois | Palmer, Hornbostel and Jones | |
| Delta Tau Delta House | 1913–1914 | 2317 Sheridan Road; Northwestern University; Evanston, Illinois | Palmer, Hornbostel and Jones | |
| Sigma Alpha Epsilon House | 1913–1914 | 2325 Sheridan Road; Northwestern University; Evanston, Illinois | Palmer, Hornbostel and Jones | |
| The Scribblers House | 1913–1914 | Northwestern University; Evanston, Illinois | Palmer, Hornbostel and Jones | |
| Sigma Nu House | 1913–1914 | 2335 Sheridan Road; Northwestern University; Evanston, Illinois | Palmer, Hornbostel and Jones | |
| The Wranglers House | 1913–1914 | 2325 Sheridan Road; Northwestern University; Evanston, Illinois | Palmer, Hornbostel and Jones | (Note: The Wranglers is a house corporation that rents to Sigma Alpha Epsilon.) |
| Oakland City Hall | 1914 | 1 Frank H. Ogawa Plaza; Oakland, California | Palmer & Hornbostel | |
| Oakland Technical High School | 1914 | 4351 Broadway; Oakland, California | Palmer & Hornbostel | |
| Hartford City Hall | 1915 | 550 Main Street; Hartford, Connecticut | Palmer & Hornbostel; Davis & Brooks | |
| Arthur S. Dwight residence | 1915 | King's Point, New York | Palmer & Hornbostel | |
| Liberty Theater | 1915 | 6113–6115 Penn Avenue; Pittsburgh, Pennsylvania | Palmer & Hornbostel; H. E. Kennedy & Company | |
| Emory College | c. 1915 | Atlanta, Georgia | Palmer & Hornbostel | |
| Callanwolde | 1916 | 980 Briarcliff Road, NE; Atlanta, Georgia | Palmer & Hornbostel | |
| Wilmington City Hall and Courthouse | 1917 | 1000 King Street; Wilmington, Delaware | Palmer, Hornbostel, and Jones | |
| Hell Gate Bridge | 1917 | New York City, New York | Palmer & Hornbostel; Gustav Lindenthal | |
| Pittsburgh City-County Building | 1917 | 414 Grant Street Pittsburgh, Pennsylvania | Palmer & Hornbostel; Edward B. Lee | |
| Library | 1918 | Northwestern University; Evanston, Illinois | Palmer & Hornbostel | |
| Morristown Memorial Hospital (enlargement) | 1919 | 100 Madison Avenue; Morristown, New Jersey | Palmer & Hornbostel | |
| Robert H. Mollohan-Jefferson Street Bridge | 1921 | Fairmont, West Virginia | Palmer & Hornbostel; Concrete Steel Engineering Company | |
| Nurses' Home, Morristown Memorial Hospital | 1921 | 56 Morris Street; Morristown, New Jersey | Palmer and Plonsky | |
| C. G. Taylor Parking Garage | 1921 | Columbus Circle District; New York City, New York | Palmer and Plonsky | |

== Personal life ==
Palmer married Helen Campbell on June 2, 1892 in Calvary Church of New York City. They had four children; three daughters survived infancy: Helen C. Palmer (born 1895), Sarah S. Palmer (born 1897), and Georgiana K. Palmer (born 1899). In 1900, the family lived at 48 West 9th Street in Greenwich Village with three servants/nurses. By 1910, the family had moved to 65 Miller Road in Morristown, New Jersey where they lived with two servants.

Palmer was a director of both the Morris County Savings Bank and the Morristown Trust Company. He was a member of the Morris County Golf Club, the St. Anthony Club of New York, and the Morristown Club of which he was president of for 25 years.

Palmer died at his home in Morristown, New Jersey on February 29, 1934.
