= Third Street Bridge (Fairmont) =

- Coordinates: 39°28′45″N 80°08′39″W
- Carries: WV 310
- Crosses: Monongahela River
- Locale: Fairmont, West Virginia
- Official name: David Morgan Memorial Bridge
- Maintained by: West Virginia Division of Highways

Characteristics
- Design: Steel Girder Bridge
- Total length: 1,104 feet (336 m)
- Width: 46.5 feet (14.2 m)

History
- Opened: 1979

The Third Street Bridge, officially known as the David Morgan Memorial Bridge, is a span that crosses the Monongahela River, in Fairmont, West Virginia. The bridge has a characteristic curve in it, and was built in 1979 in order to relieve some of the traffic from the Robert H. Mollohan-Jefferson Street Bridge after the Low Level Bridge had closed.

== See also ==
- List of crossings of the Monongahela River
