= Delta Psi (disambiguation) =

Delta Psi, or St. Anthony Hall, is an American a co-ed social and literary fraternity.

Delta Psi may also refer to:

- Delta Psi (University of Vermont), a defunct local fraternity
- Delta Psi, Alpha Chapter building, a fraternity house in Manhattan, New York City
