= Delta Psi, Alpha Chapter building =

Fraternity house in New York City

- Delta Psi, Alpha Chapter
- U.S. National Register of Historic Places
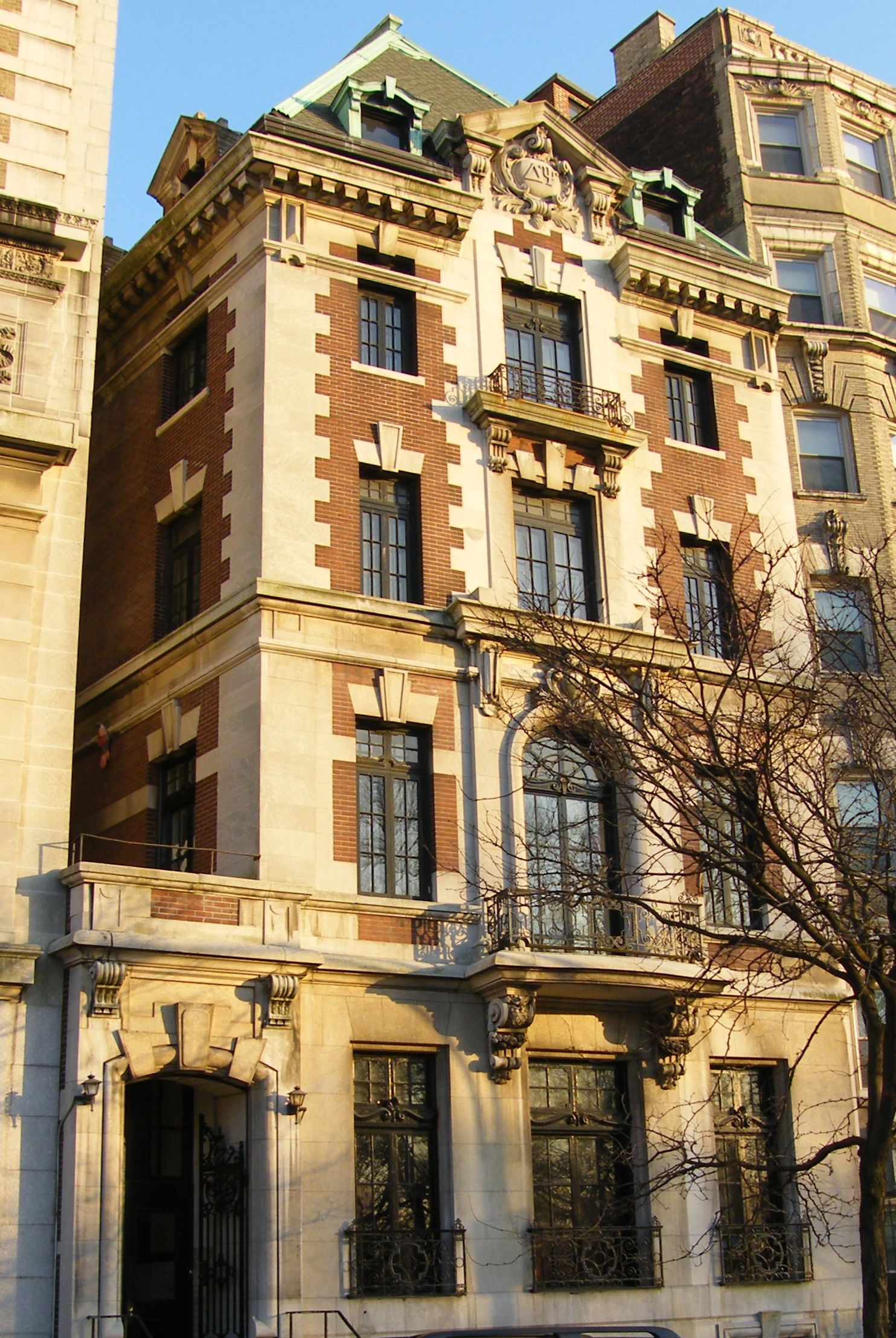
- Delta Psi, Alpha Chapter in 2009

- Location within Manhattan Location within New York Location within the United States
- Location: 434 Riverside Drive, New York, New York, U.S.
- Coordinates: 40°48′30″N 73°57′59″W
- Built: 1898
- Architect: Henry Hornbostel and George Carnegie Palmer
- Architectural style: Beaux Arts and French Renaissance revival
- NRHP reference No.: 96000484
- Added to NRHP: April 26, 1996

The Delta Psi, Alpha Chapter fraternity house is located at 434 Riverside Drive in the Morningside Heights neighborhood of Manhattan, New York City. It was purpose built in 1898 and continues to serve the Columbia chapter of the Fraternity of Delta Psi (aka St. Anthony Hall), a social and literary fraternity.

The chapter house was designed by two prominent New York City architects, Henry Hornbostel and George Carnegie Palmer. At this time of its construction, the press described it as "the best appointed and most costly [fraternity] building that has ever been erected in the United States".

For its architectural significance, the Delta Psi, Alpha Chapter building was added to the National Register of Historic Places on April 26, 1996.

== History ==
On March 23, 1897, the Alpha chapter of the Fraternity of Delta Psi (St. Anthony Hall) purchased a 36 feet (11 m) wide lot on 434 Riverside Drive from Harriet B. Hale. The fraternity intended to build a new chapter house closer to Columbia University, which had recently moved to Morningside Heights. The fraternity's previous Renaissance Revival style chapter house, designed in 1879 by fraternity member William Hamilton Russell of the firm of James Renwick Jr., was at 29 E. 28th Street. In addition to proximity to campus, the new site "afforded breathtaking views of the Hudson River and New Jersey palisades."

In 1898, the fraternity hired the architectural firm of Wood, Palmer & Hornbostel to design its new chapter house. The architects were Henry Hornbostel and George Carnegie Palmer; the latter was a member of the Columbia chapter of St. Anthony Hall. The architects filed plans with the city on August 26, 1898. The plans called for a five-story building constructed of brick and stone, costing $45,000 (equivalent to $1,741,500 in today's money). However, the actual cost of the chapter house was closer to $80,000 (equivalent to $3,096,000 in today's money). In 1899, the lot was worth another $20,000 (equivalent to $774,000 in today's money).

At the time the fraternity built this chapter house, students did not live on Columbia's campus. Thus, "Delta Psi was not only the first fraternity to erect its own chapter house near the new Columbia campus, but, in 1899, when it was completed, it was one of only a handful of buildings on Morningside Heights where students could live." Although two other fraternities also built chapter houses in the Morningside neighborhood, this is the only one still in use by a fraternity. Ultimately, land values increased so quickly that its cost outpriced student housing. By 1905, Columbia University provided on-campus residences for students.

== Description ==
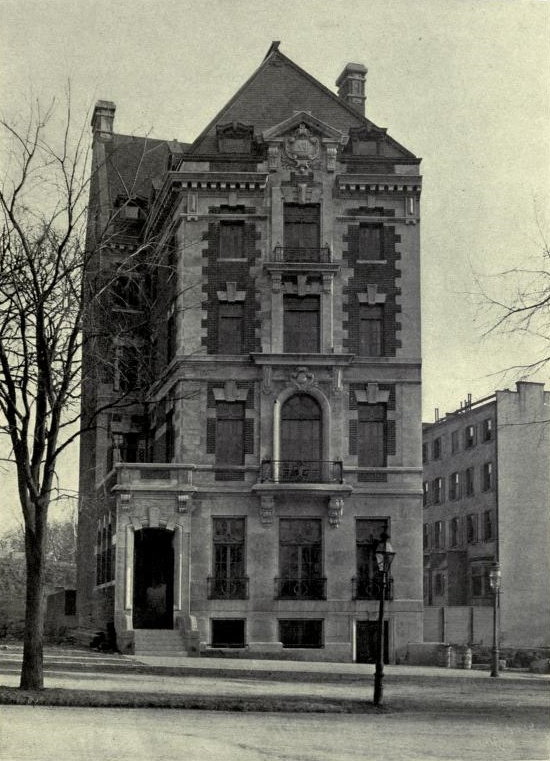
Alpha Chapter house, circa 1906

The Alpha chapter house was designed in Beaux Arts and French Renaissance revival styles. It is unknown why this style was chosen. The style may have been selected "because it was fashionable or because the red brick and limestone trim were similar to the materials used at Columbia's new buildings. However, the style was likely chosen because it resembled the earlier fraternity house on 28th Street, designed by James Renwick.

The building has five stories and a basement. The foundation is constructed of white Indiana limestone. The first story is completely faced with Indiana limestone, with the remaining stories being in red brick that is heavily trimmed in limestone. Above the fourth story, there is a stone cornice surrounding a carved cartouche with the fraternity's Greek letters ΔΨ.

The entrance stoop has granite steps that lead through an arched entrance with ornate wrought iron gates. The actual entrance is set back with a seven-foot wide covered porch or arcade that also served as a balcony for the second story (see photo to left). However, the original north-facing arcade and the windows above it are now blocked by an adjacent building that was constructed in 1910. The upper levels are L–shaped with light courts to provide natural light and ventilation for all rooms. The second, third, and fourth floors have balconies with wrought iron railings. The fifth floor had copper covered dormers. The pyramid-shaped roof is covered in slate. There is also a small yard at the back of the building.

The main entrance goes to an arcade that leads to an L–shaped hallway with Doric columns, paneled wainscotting, a dentil cornice, and wooden doors. The first and second floors contain public spaces, including a coat room, reception room, parlors, a ballroom, a billiard room, a study, and a dining room. The main parlor on the first floor is trapezoidal–shaped and features a large marble fireplace and overmantel which is decorated with owls, shields, and decorative moldings. The fireplace was given in memory of Joseph Wild Mackay who joined the fraternity in 1900. Also on the first floor, the Arts and Crafts style dining room stretches across the entire width of the building and features Dutch shelving, leaded windows, and wood wainscotting. The second-floor billiard room is still in use. The stairs have slate treads and iron risers, railings, and balusters. There were additional stairs for servants.

The upper three levels include bedrooms for twenty to 25 fraternity members. The third floor also includes a library with built-in shelving, a fireplace, and a molded plaster ceiling; the library is dedicated in memory of Henry Evelyn Pierrepont Jr, who joined the fraternity in 1896 and died in 1903. The basement includes a caretaker's room and a "secret chapter meeting room".

In 1906, fraternity historian Edward Fermor Hall wrote that the Alpha chapter house was "beautifully decorated and finished in marble at a large expense."

== Noteworthy events ==
- On July 11, 1915, Delta Psi alumnus Daniel Leroy Dresser committed suicide over financial problems in the library of the chapter house. Dresser was the brother-in-law of George Washington Vanderbilt II of Biltmore Estate.
- The chandelier in the ballroom was featured on the cover of Vampire Weekend's first album.

== See also ==
- North American fraternity and sorority housing
