= New York State Education Building =

Historic place in New York, United States

- U.S. National Register of Historic Places
- U.S. Historic district – Contributing property
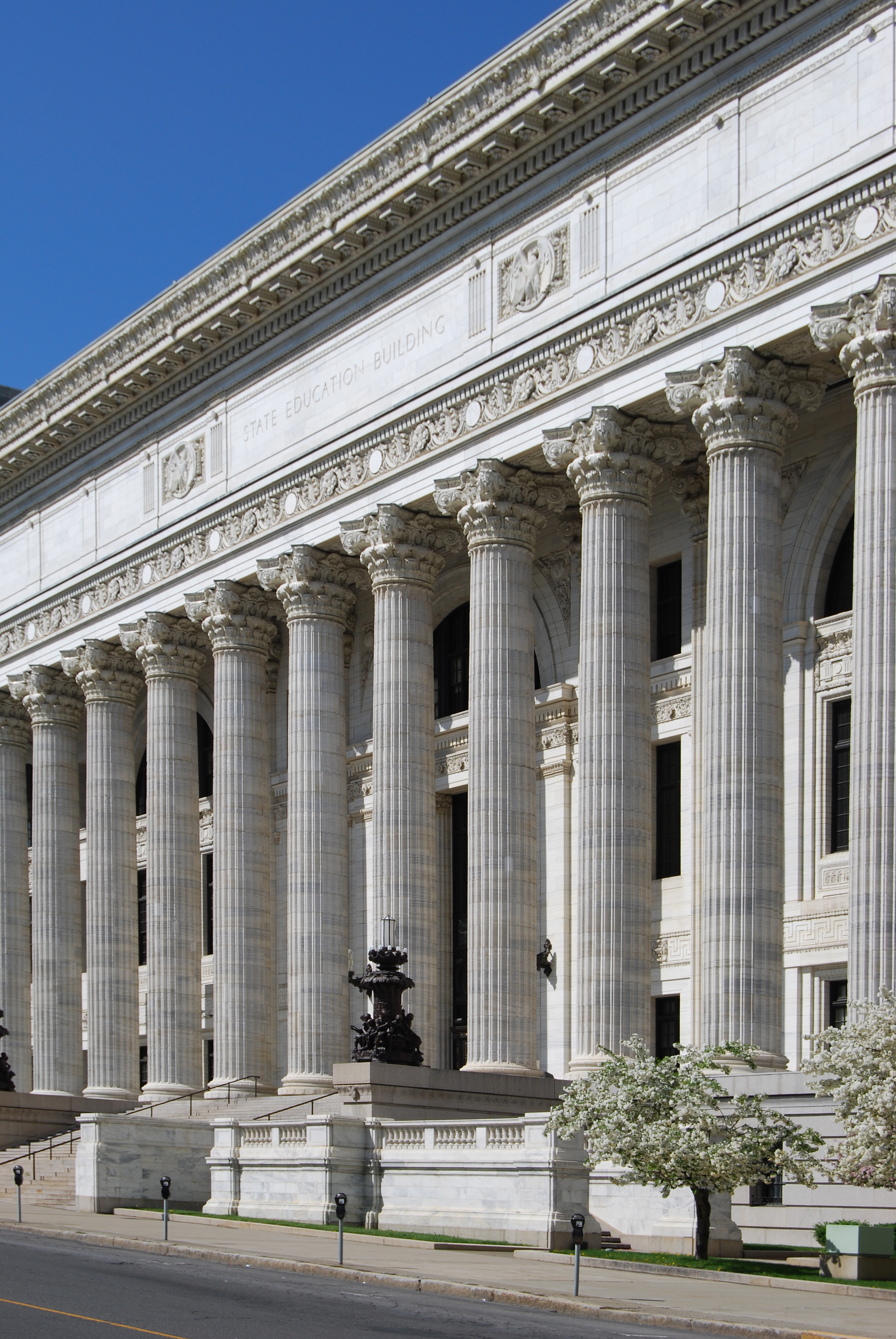

- Location within New York
- Location: 89 Washington Avenue (between Hawk and Swan Streets); Albany, New York 12234
- Coordinates: 42°39′14″N 73°45′29″W
- Built: 1908-11
- Architect: Henry Hornbostel
- Architectural style: Beaux-Arts
- Part of: Lafayette Park Historic District
- NRHP reference No.: 71000521
- Added to NRHP: March 18, 1971

The New York State Education Building^{[a]} (commonly known as the State Education Building) is a state office building in Albany, New York. It houses offices of the New York State Education Department (NYSED) and was formerly home to the New York State Museum and New York State Library. Designed by Henry Hornbostel in the Beaux-Arts style and opened in 1912, the building is known for its expansive colonnade.

== History ==
The State Education Building was designed by George Carnegie Palmer and Henry Hornbostel of the New York City firm Palmer & Horbostel, and contracted and built by M. F. Dollard Construction between 1908 and 1912. It was the "first major building constructed in the United States solely as a headquarters for the administration of education."

Dr. Andrew Sloan Draper was the first Commissioner of Education of the State of New York and wanted a separate Education Building to provide more space for the growing agency. In 1906, after two years of negotiations with the New York Legislature, Draper secured a site near the New York State Capitol building. However, William Croswell Doane, the first Episcopal Bishop in Albany, was building the Cathedral of All Saints on South Swan Street, on the very block that Commissioner Draper viewed as his.

When Doane was out of Albany, Draper used his political influence to snatch up surrounding property and forever obscured the view of Doane's new building from Washington Avenue and from the skyline as seen from the Hudson River. The Education Building cost approximately $4 million. It was finished on January 1, 1911 but was not dedicated until November 1912 with the state museum and library moving into fireproof wings in the building. In March 1911 a fire in the Capitol destroyed some of the state library collection before it was moved; over 450,000 books and 270,000 manuscripts and journals were lost in this disaster.

In 1959, work was finished on a ten-story addition to the northeastern side of the building along Hawk and Elk streets. The addition is called the New York State Education Building Annex.

The building was designed in the Beaux-Arts style. It was listed on the U.S. National Register of Historic Places in 1971.

The building housed the New York State Museum from 1912 until as late as 1976, when the museum was relocated to the Cultural Education Center (part of the Empire State Plaza). The New York State Library, also housed in the Education Building, was moved to the Cultural Education Center as well.

== Architecture ==
The State Education Building is notable for its massive colonnade. Its NRHP application claimed that the colonnade is "one of the longest in the world." According to Emporis, "The 36 Corinthian columns facing Washington Avenue form the longest colonnade in the United States." The colonnade consists of "36 hollow marble columns with terra-cotta corinthian capitals and a very wide entablature." The colonnade is 590 feet long and was believed to be the largest in the world at the time of its construction. While at 590 feet, it may be the longest colonnade in the United States, the U.S. Treasury Department Building designed by architect Robert Mills features a length of 45 columns, but only measures 350 feet.

The building has a T-shaped layout, with the colonnade forming the top bar of the T. Its Neoclassical design reflects the renewed interest in this style that followed the 1893 Columbian Exposition. Flanking the entrance are two sculptures of seated children; these sculptures serve as lampposts. Important interior features of the building include the 94-foot-high (29 m) rotunda, with its glass-and steel-dome, and the 50-foot-high (15 m) reading room, with its large arched windows. The rotunda also contains barrel-vaulted glass skylights and a mural depicting "man's quest for education."

== Gallery ==
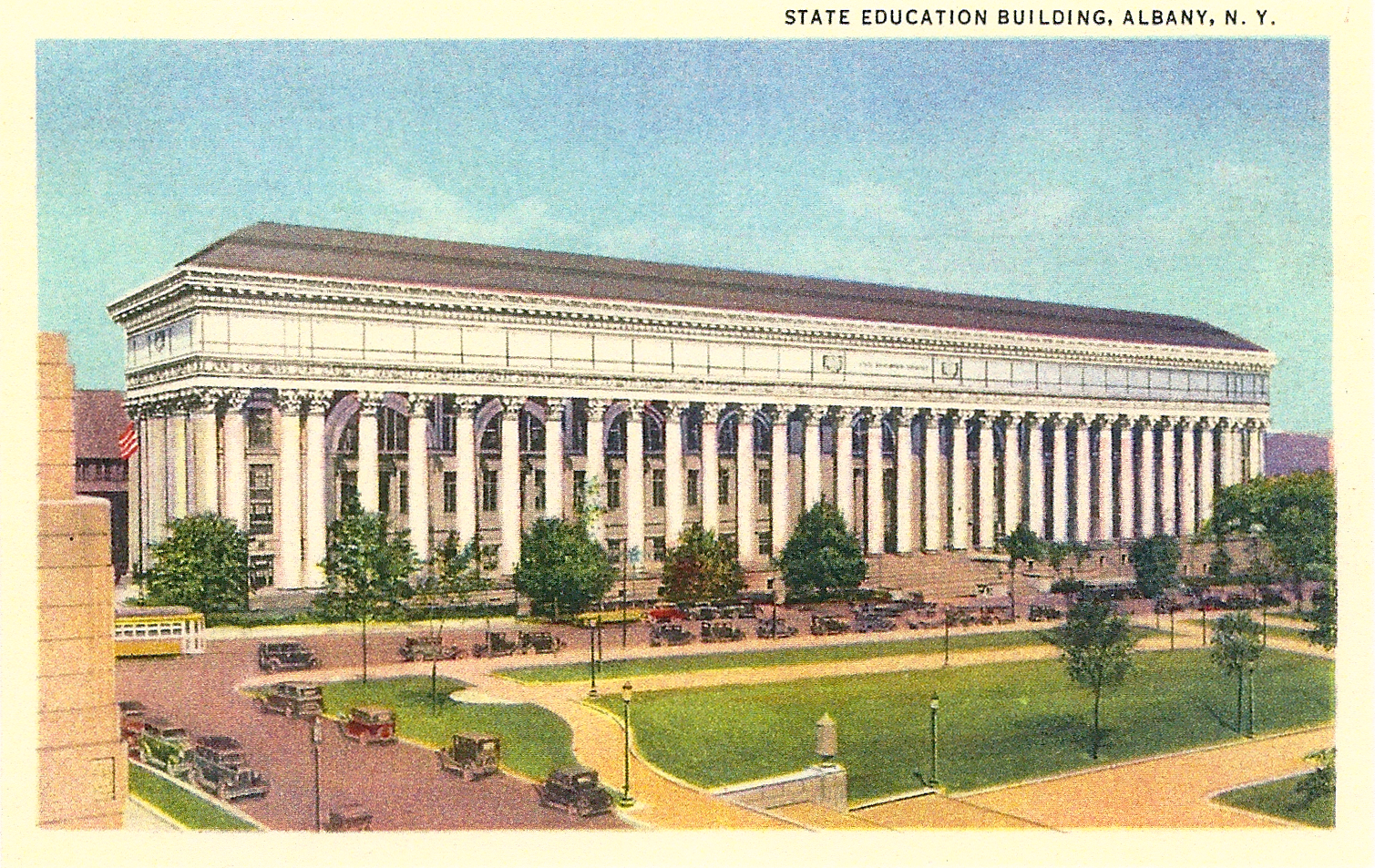
Postcard, c.1900

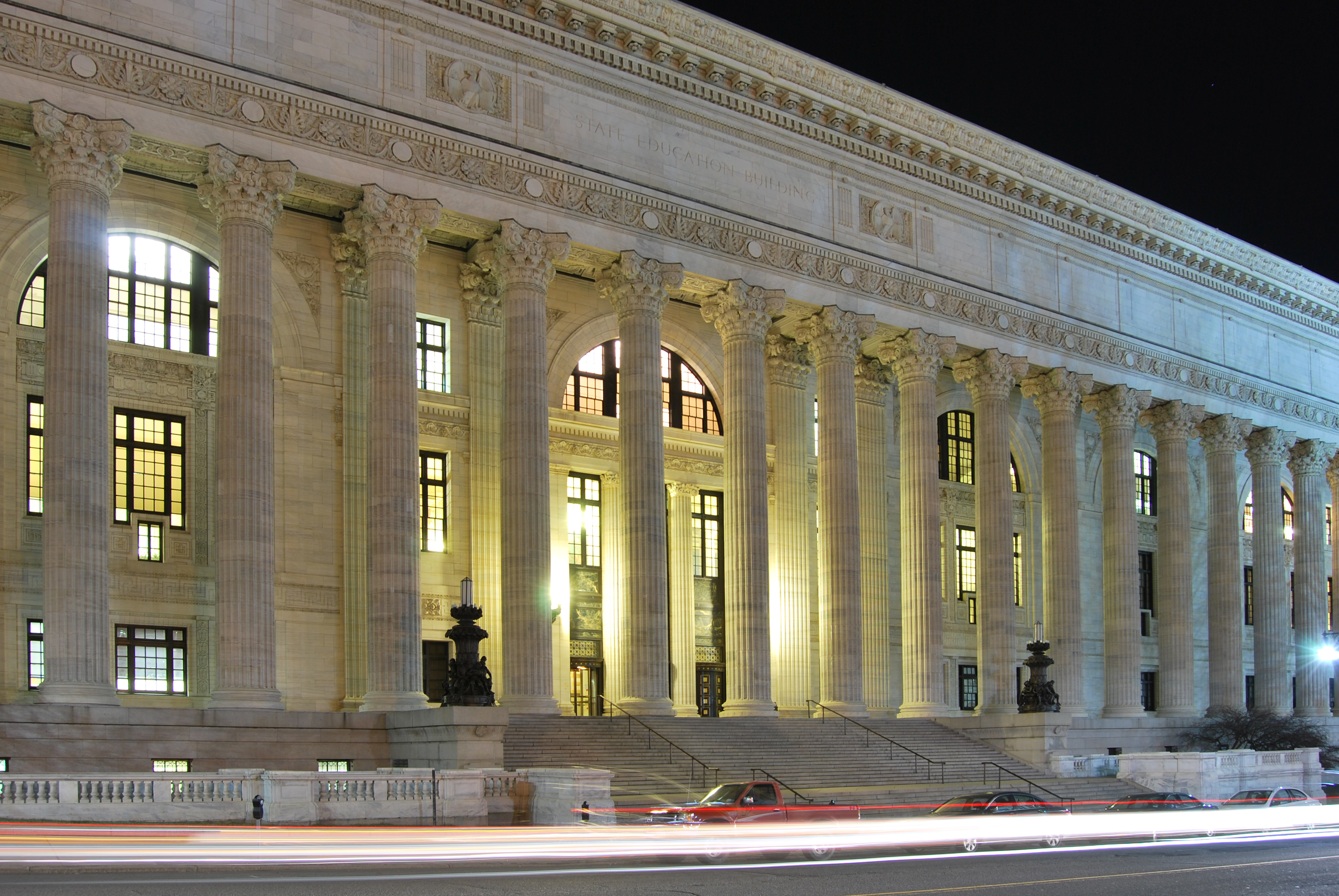
At night

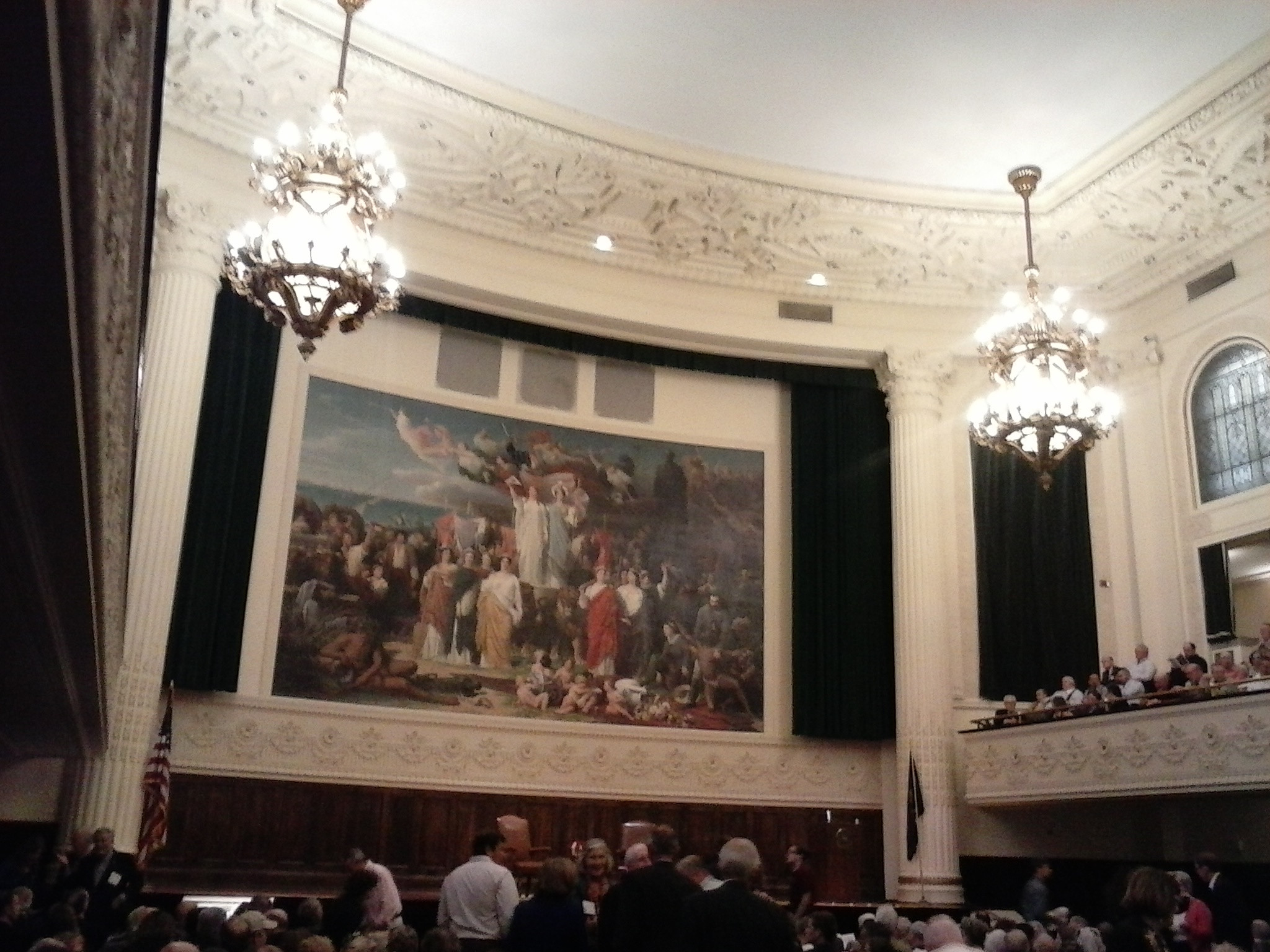
Chancellors Hall

== See also ==
- National Register of Historic Places listings in Albany, New York
