= Congregation B'nai Israel (Pittsburgh) =

Former synagogue in Pittsburgh, Pennsylvania, United States

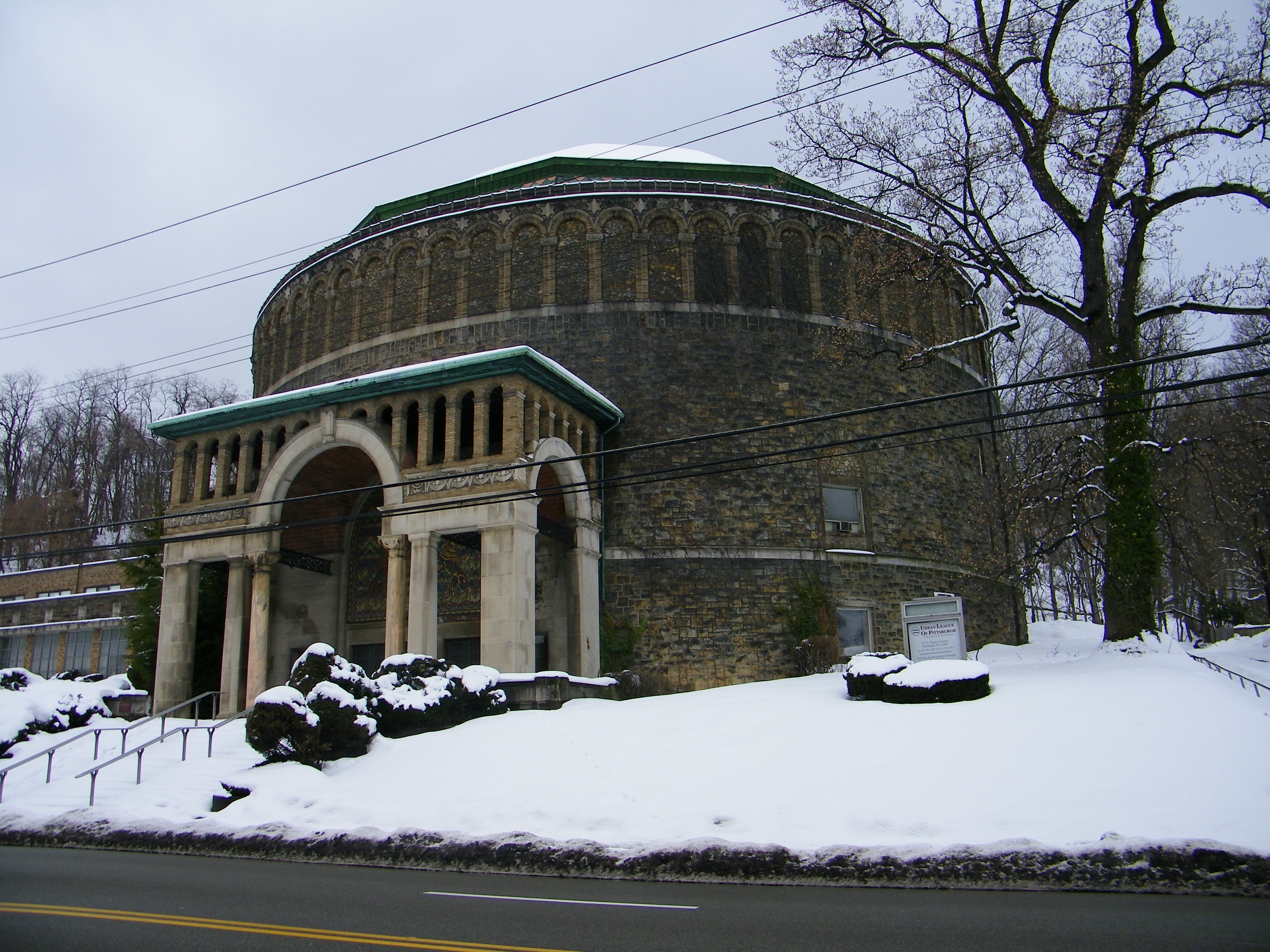
- The former synagogue in 2010

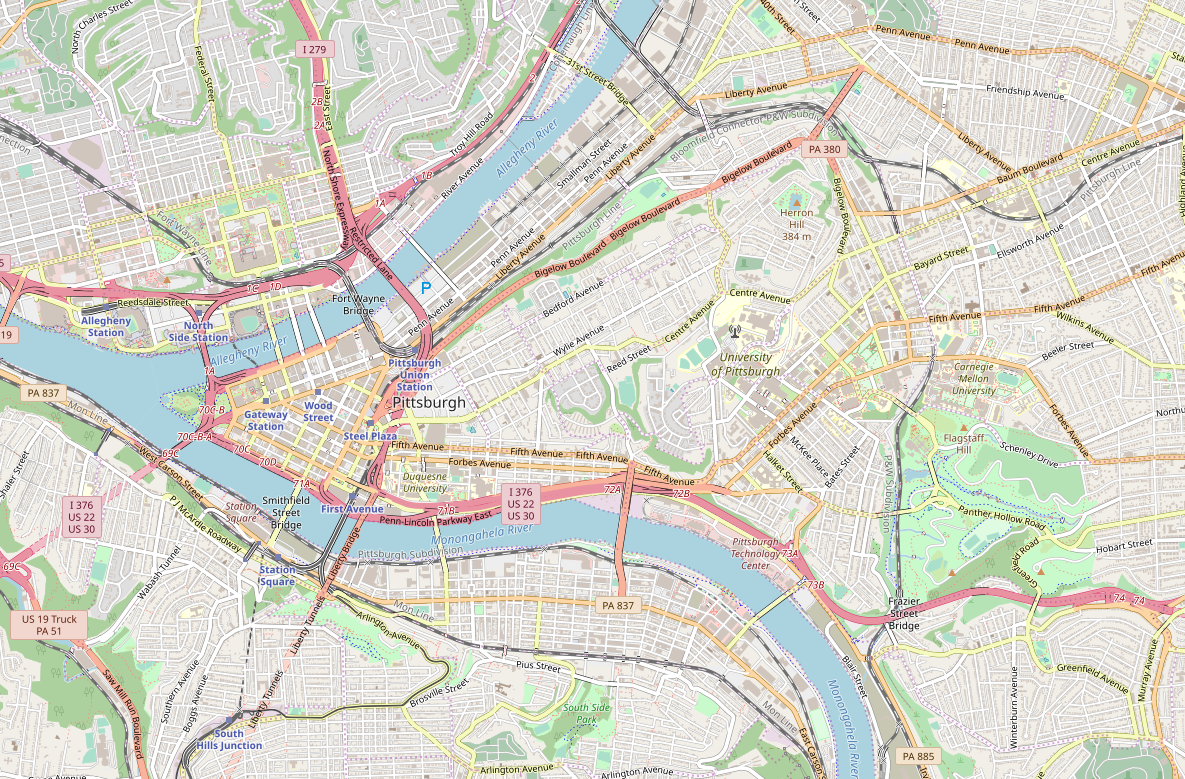
- Location of the former synagogue in downtown Pittsburgh

Religion
- Affiliation: Judaism (former)
- Ecclesiastical or organizational status: Synagogue (1923–1995); Charter school; Apartments (since 2021)
- Status: Closed (as a synagogue); Repurposed

Location
- Location: 327 North Negley Avenue, Garfield, Pittsburgh, Pennsylvania
- Country: United States
- Interactive map of Congregation B'nai Israel
- Coordinates: 40°27′59″N 79°55′45″W

Architecture
- Architects: Henry Hornbostel; William S. Fraser; Philip Friedman; Alexander Sharove
- Type: Synagogue architecture
- Completed: 1923
- Congregation B'nai Israel
- Pittsburgh History and Landmarks Foundation Historic Landmarks
- Designated PHLF: 1979

Congregation B'nai Israel is a former synagogue located at 327 North Negley Avenue in the Garfield neighborhood of Pittsburgh, Pennsylvania, in the United States. It was built in 1923 and was added to the List of Pittsburgh History and Landmarks Foundation Historic Landmarks in 1979.

The synagogue closed in 1995 and the building was later used by the Urban League of Greater Pittsburgh Charter School. In 2021, ground was broken on a new project which will convert the building into apartments.
