= Low Level Bridge (Fairmont, West Virginia) =

Coordinates: 39°28′58″N 80°08′22″W

Low Level Bridge is the nickname of a bridge that was in Fairmont, West Virginia.

== History ==
In 1908, after rapid growth in population due to industry, a steel bridge was erected in Fairmont to replace the old suspension bridge across the Monongahela River. The bridge was called the "Nickel Bridge" because one had to pay a nickel toll in order to cross it. It was also called the "Low Level Bridge" because it was downstream from the Robert H. Mollohan-Jefferson Street Bridge which was on a higher level. Over the years, it fell into poor repair and was closed after it was found to be unsafe in the late 1980s. The bridge sat unused for many years and was demolished in the 2000s. The only remnant from the bridge is a pier that still stands in the middle of the Monongahela River.
