= Oakland City Hall =

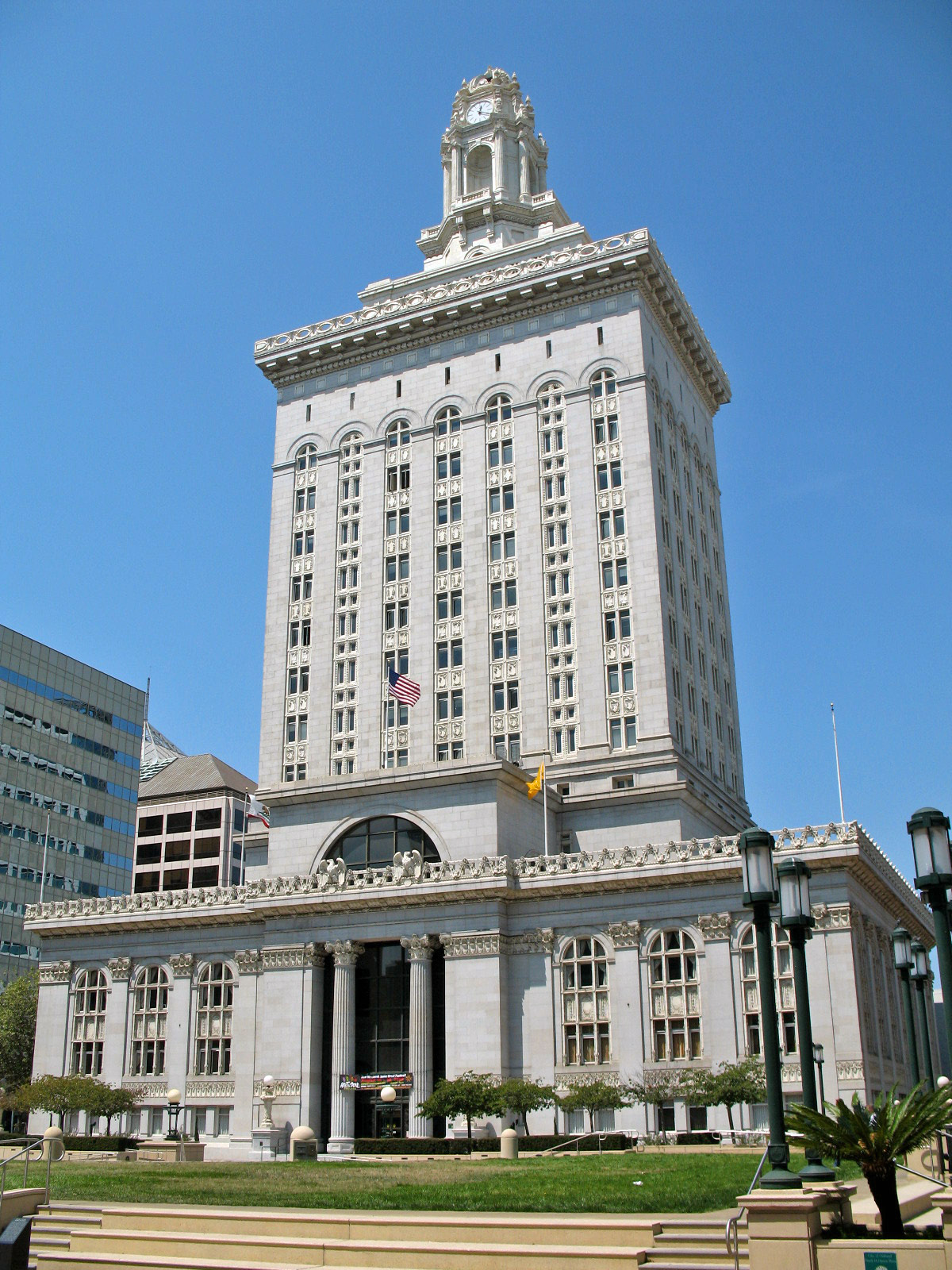

- Location within Oakland, California Location within California Location within the United States

General information
- Type: Government offices
- Location: 1 Frank H. Ogawa Plaza; Oakland, California
- Coordinates: 37.8053°N 122.2725°W
- Construction started: 1910
- Completed: 1914
- Owner: Oakland, California

Height
- Roof: 320 ft (98 m)

Technical details
- Floor count: 18

Design and construction
- Architect: Palmer & Hornbostel
- Oakland City Hall
- U.S. National Register of Historic Places
- Oakland Designated Landmark
- Architectural style: Beaux-Arts
- NRHP reference No.: 83001170
- ODL No.: 28

Significant dates
- Designated NRHP: September 15, 1983
- Designated ODL: 1979

Oakland City Hall is the seat of government for the city of Oakland, California. The current building was completed in 1914, and replaced a prior building that stood on what is now Frank H. Ogawa Plaza. Standing at the height of 320 feet (98 m), it was the first high-rise government building in the United States. At the time it was built, it was also the tallest building west of the Mississippi River. The City Hall is depicted on the city seal of Oakland.

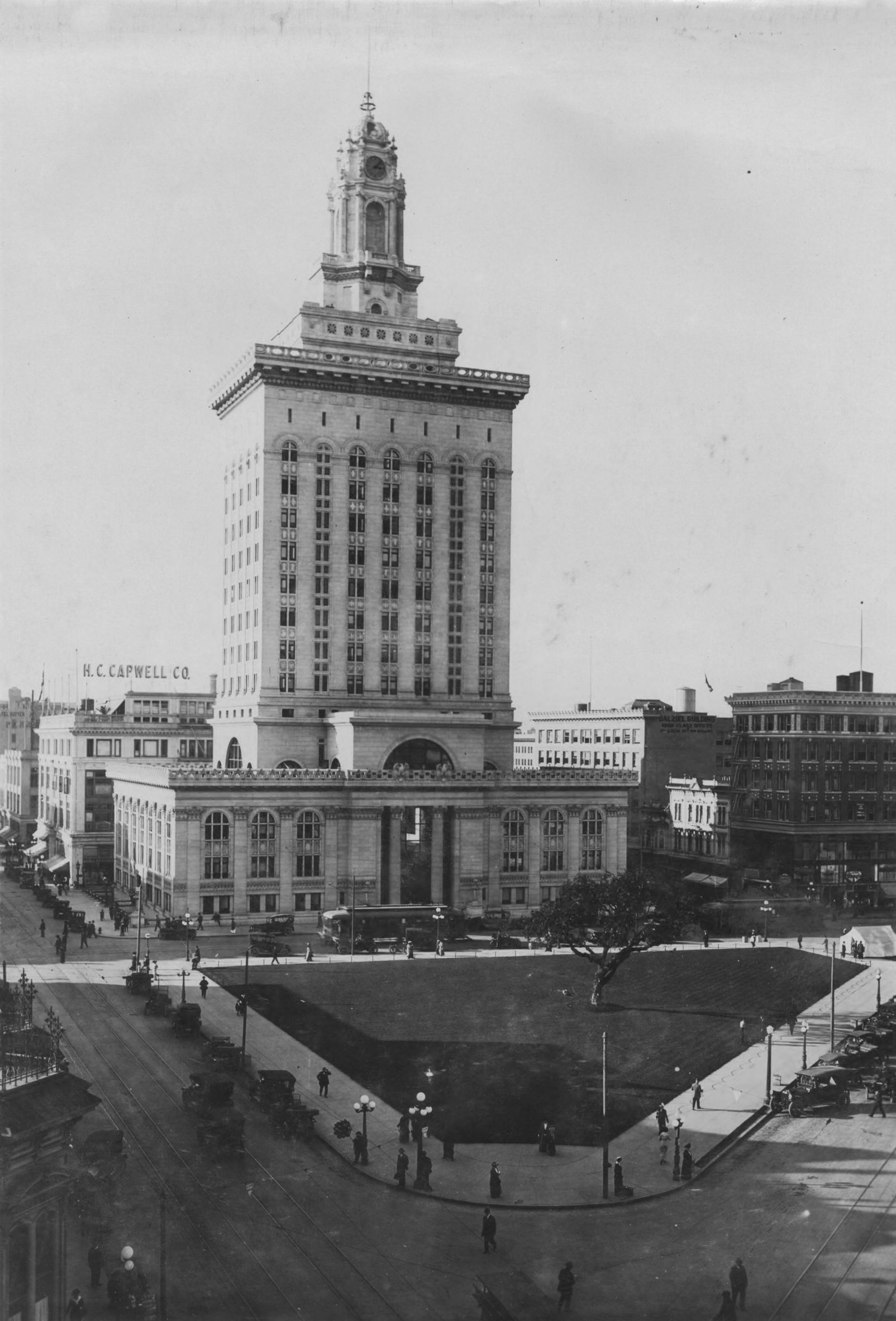
Oakland City Hall in 1917

The building was designed by New York–based architecture firm Palmer & Hornbostel in 1910, after winning a nationwide design competition. The building, constructed in the Beaux-Arts style, resembles a "rectangular wedding cake". It consists of three tiers. The bottom tier serves the foundation. It is three stories high and houses the mayor's office, the city council chamber, hearing rooms, and a police station with a firing range below in the basement. The thinner second tier follows; it is a ten-story office tower. The top floor of this section (the 12th floor) houses a 36-cell jail with an outdoor yard that has gone unused since the 1960s. Above the second tier is the two-story podium with a clock tower on top. The exterior is built of white granite and terra cotta, while the inside is built of white and black marble. The building was nicknamed "Mayor Mott's wedding cake" after former Oakland Mayor Frank Kanning Mott, a key player in passing the bond to pay for the new City Hall, who was married the same year construction began.

In 1983, the Oakland City Hall was added to the National Register of Historic Places.

After the 1989 Loma Prieta earthquake, the building suffered from major structural damage and was immediately closed down. Instead of tearing it down and replacing it with a newer building, city leaders decided to retrofit it seismically. To do so, steel columns in the foundation were cut and they were replaced by rubber bearings. Steel beams were added to support the steel structure and concrete walls were added to support existing walls. The building can now move laterally 18-20 inches in an earthquake. The city hall was repaired along with the downtown revitalization project of building new office buildings. The repair project cost $85 million.
