= Robert H. Mollohan–Jefferson Street Bridge =

Bridge in Fairmont, West Virginia, US

Jefferson Street Bridge
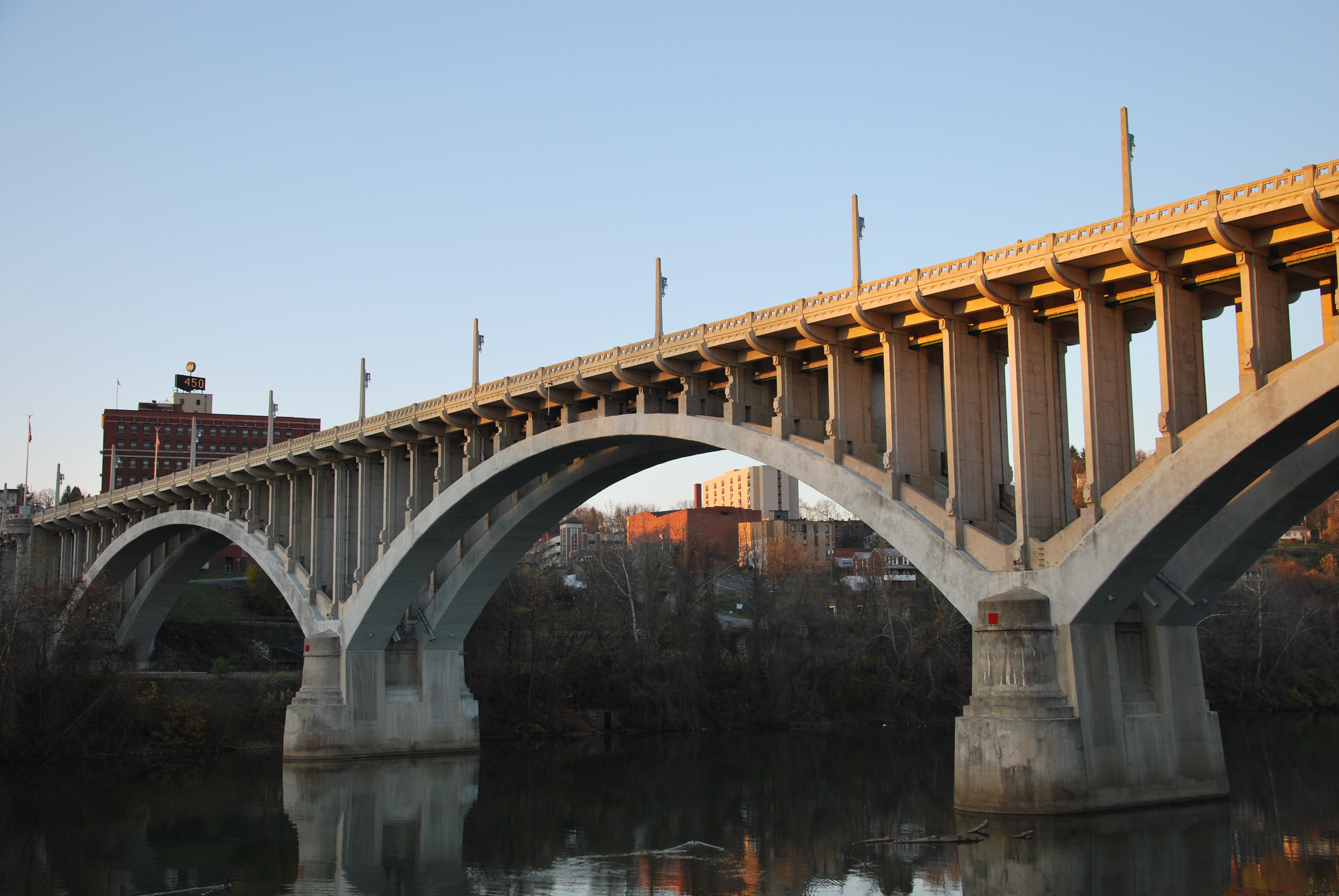
- Coordinates: 39°28′57″N 80°08′26″W
- Carries: CR 1973 (Jefferson Street)
- Crosses: Monongahela River
- Locale: Fairmont, West Virginia, U.S.
- Official name: Robert H. Mollohan-Jefferson Street Bridge
- Other name(s): High Level Bridge; Million Dollar Bridge
- Maintained by: West Virginia Division of Highways

Characteristics
- Design: Concrete Arch Bridge
- Material: Concrete
- Total length: 1,320 ft (400 m) long
- Width: 56 ft (17 m) wide;
- Longest span: 250 ft (76 m)

History
- Architect: George Carnegie Palmer and Henry Hornbostel
- Opened: 1921

The Robert H. Mollohan–Jefferson Street Bridge, also known as the Million Dollar Bridge or High Level Bridge, is located in Fairmont, Marion County, West Virginia. It was dedicated on May 30, 1921. This bridge connects east and west Fairmont, and crosses the Monongahela River. It was listed on the National Register of Historic Places in 1991.

== History ==
in 1916, Manufactures Record published an article saying that Fairmont, West Virginia had issued a $400,000 bond to build two concrete bridges to replace the mid-19th century suspension bridge. Because the actual cost of the bridges was significantly higher, this project was called the "million dollar bridge."

Once plans were prepared, Manufactures Record published a drawing and statistics: 1,320 ft (400 m) long, 56 ft (17 m) wide; with three reinforced concrete arches that each have two ribs and a clear span of 250 ft (76 m).

George Carnegie Palmer and Henry Hornbostel of the New York City architectural firm Palmer & Hornbostel were consultants to the Concrete Steel Engineering Company for the design of the bridge. Palmer & Hornbostel gave "the bridge thirty-three concrete obelisks supporting bronze light fixtures, an open balustrade, and four balconies with flagpoles. Below, three large segmental arches with open-rib spandrels evince a happy marriage of engineering and architecture." The bridge opened in 1921.

After falling into poor repair over the years, it was preserved, repaired, and reopened in October 2000. The bridge is now a significant historic landmark in the city. It is still the largest reinforced concrete arch bridge in West Virginia.

== See also ==
- List of crossings of the Monongahela River
