= Henry Hornbostel =

American architect

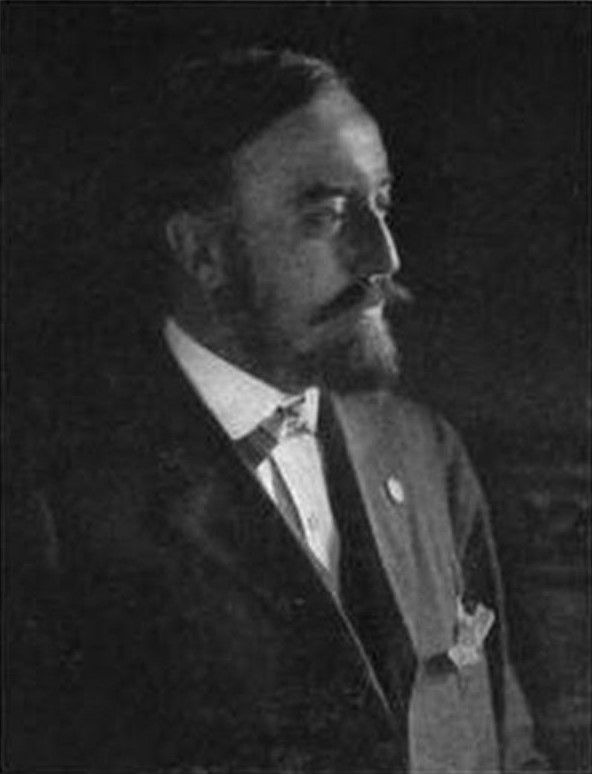
- Henry Hornbostel, 1915
- Born: 1867; Brooklyn, New York, U.S.
- Died: 1961 (aged 93–94)
- Occupation: Architect
- Practice: Raymond & Hornbostel; Wood, Palmer & Hornbostel; Palmer & Hornbostel; Palmer, Hornbostel & Jones; Henry Hornbostel

Henry Hornbostel (August 15, 1867 – December 13, 1961) was an American architect and educator. Hornbostel designed more than 225 buildings, bridges, and monuments in the United States. Twenty-two of his designs are listed on the National Register of Historic Places, including the Oakland City Hall in Oakland, California and the Soldiers and Sailors Memorial Hall and Museum and University Club in Pittsburgh, Pennsylvania.

== About ==
The son of Edward Hornbostel, a stockbroker, and Johanna Cassebeer, Hornbostel was born and raised in Brooklyn, New York. He trained in architecture at Columbia University (BA 1891) and the École des Beaux-Arts in Paris (1893–97). Hornbostel distinguished himself as a superb draftsman and renderer, earning in Paris the name, “l’homme perspectif.” He was a partner, over his career, in the New York firms of Howell, Stokes & Hornbostel; Wood, Palmer & Hornbostel; Palmer & Hornbostel; and Palmer, Hornbostel & Jones. He also practiced independently from a Pittsburgh, Pennsylvania office.

Hornbostel first earned distinction for his work with the Board of Estimate and Apportionment in New York City, assisting engineers in the design of bridges. Between 1903 and 1917, he was responsible for the architecture of the Queensborough, Williamsburg, Manhattan, Pelham Park, and Hell Gate bridges—spans for both automobiles and trains. His masterpiece, the Hell Gate Bridge (1917), is considered by many to be one of the most beautiful railway bridges in the world.

In 1903, Palmer & Hornbostel won a competition for the design of a new campus for Pittsburgh's Carnegie Technical Schools (later Carnegie Mellon University). Their Beaux-Arts scheme created an ordered, axial sequence of buildings despite the hilly topography. Hornbostel convinced Andrew Carnegie, his patron, to hire him as a professor in a new school of design at the university, allowing him the time and latitude to perfect his design over decades. The result is one of America's most distinctive classical campuses, on a par with those of Columbia University and the University of Virginia. He was active in the Pittsburgh area, and influenced many buildings there in the early 20th century.

== Buildings ==
Nearly half of his works (110) were in Pittsburgh, an industrial boomtown in the early twentieth century, where in 1904 he won the campus design competition for Andrew Carnegie's Carnegie Technical Schools (today's Carnegie Mellon University). He also helped to establish Carnegie Mellon School of Architecture that same year. He also designed many of the original buildings of Emory University in Atlanta.

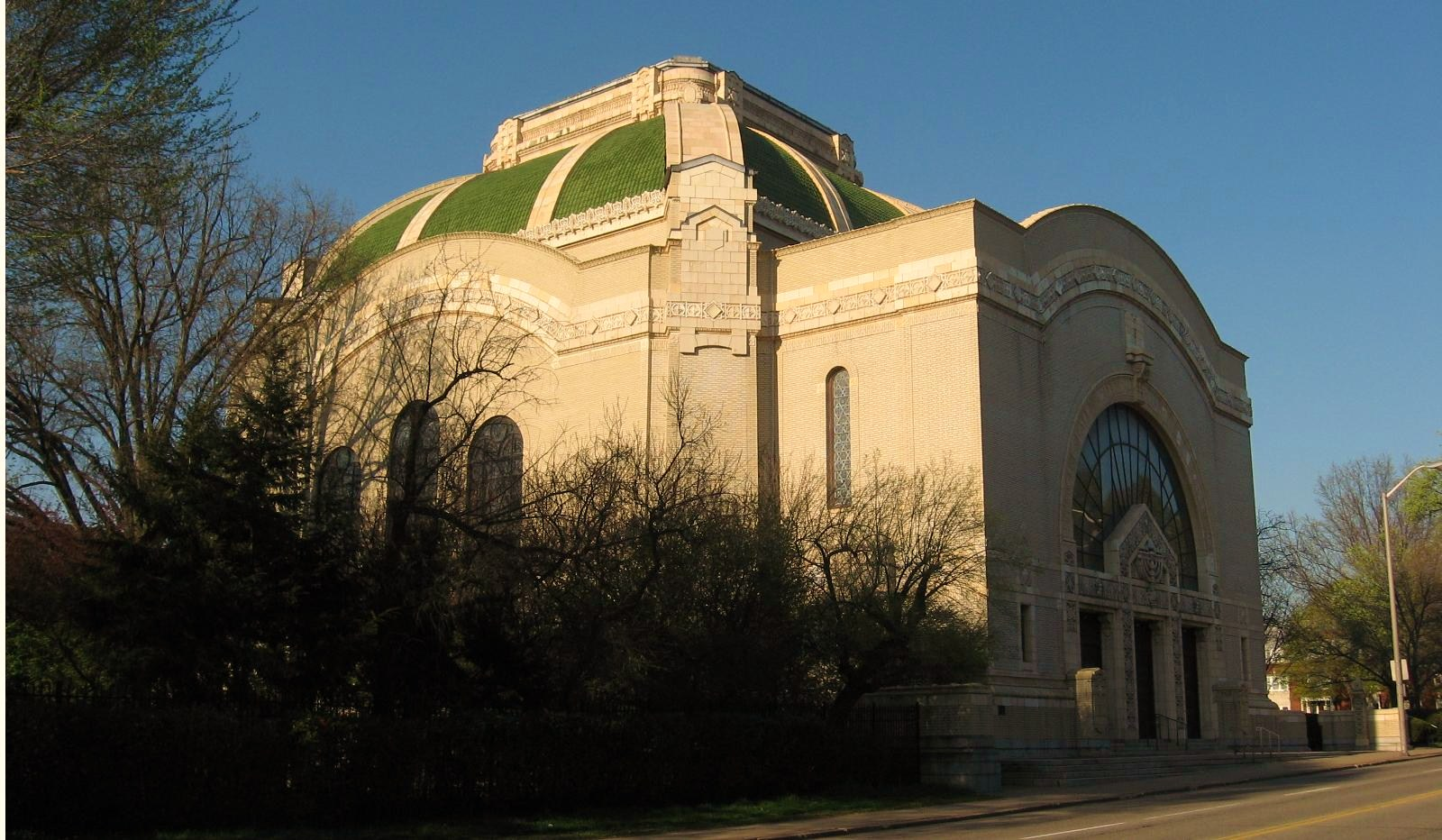
Rodef Shalom Temple from Fifth Avenue, Pittsburgh, Pennsylvania

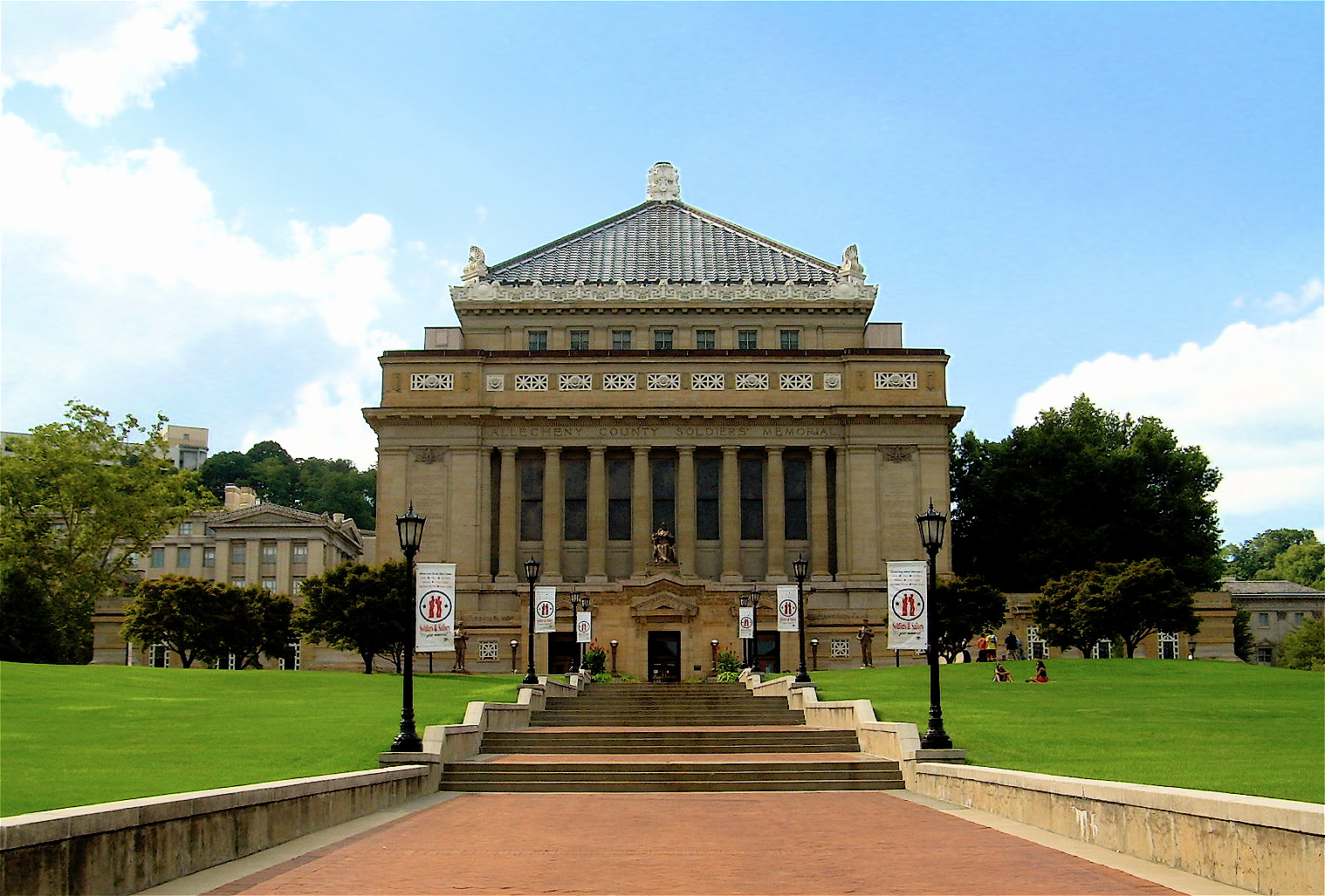
Soldiers and Sailors National Military Museum and Memorial in Pittsburgh

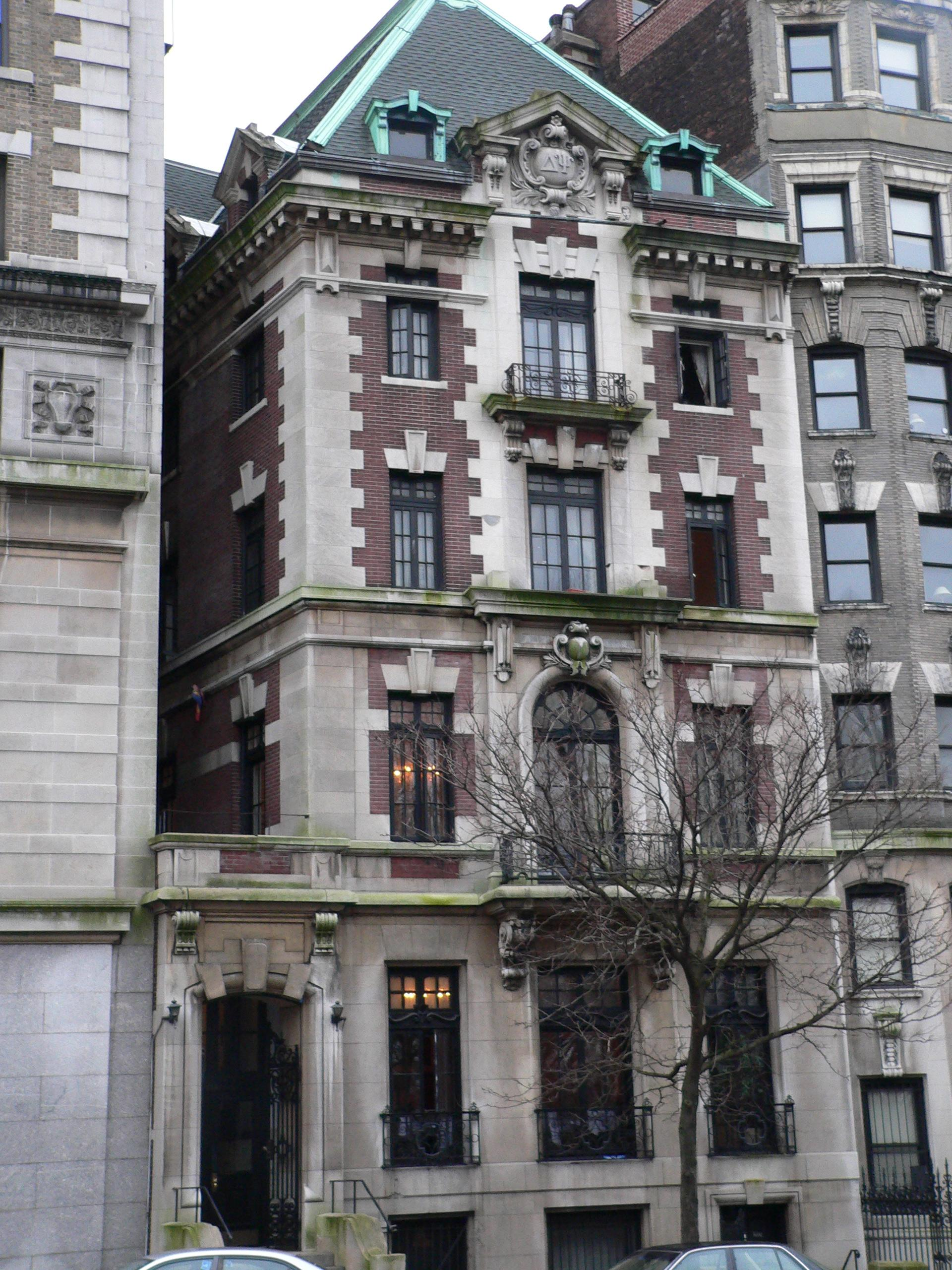
Chapter House of St. Anthony Hall, Columbia University, New York City

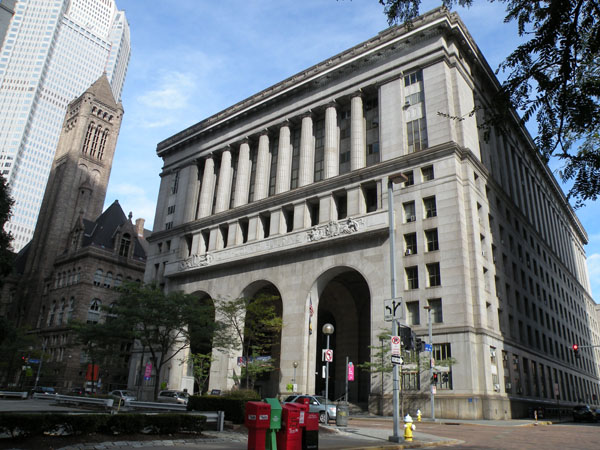
Pittsburgh City-County Building, Henry Hornbostel, designer; Edward B. Lee, architect, with Palmer, Hornbostel & Jones

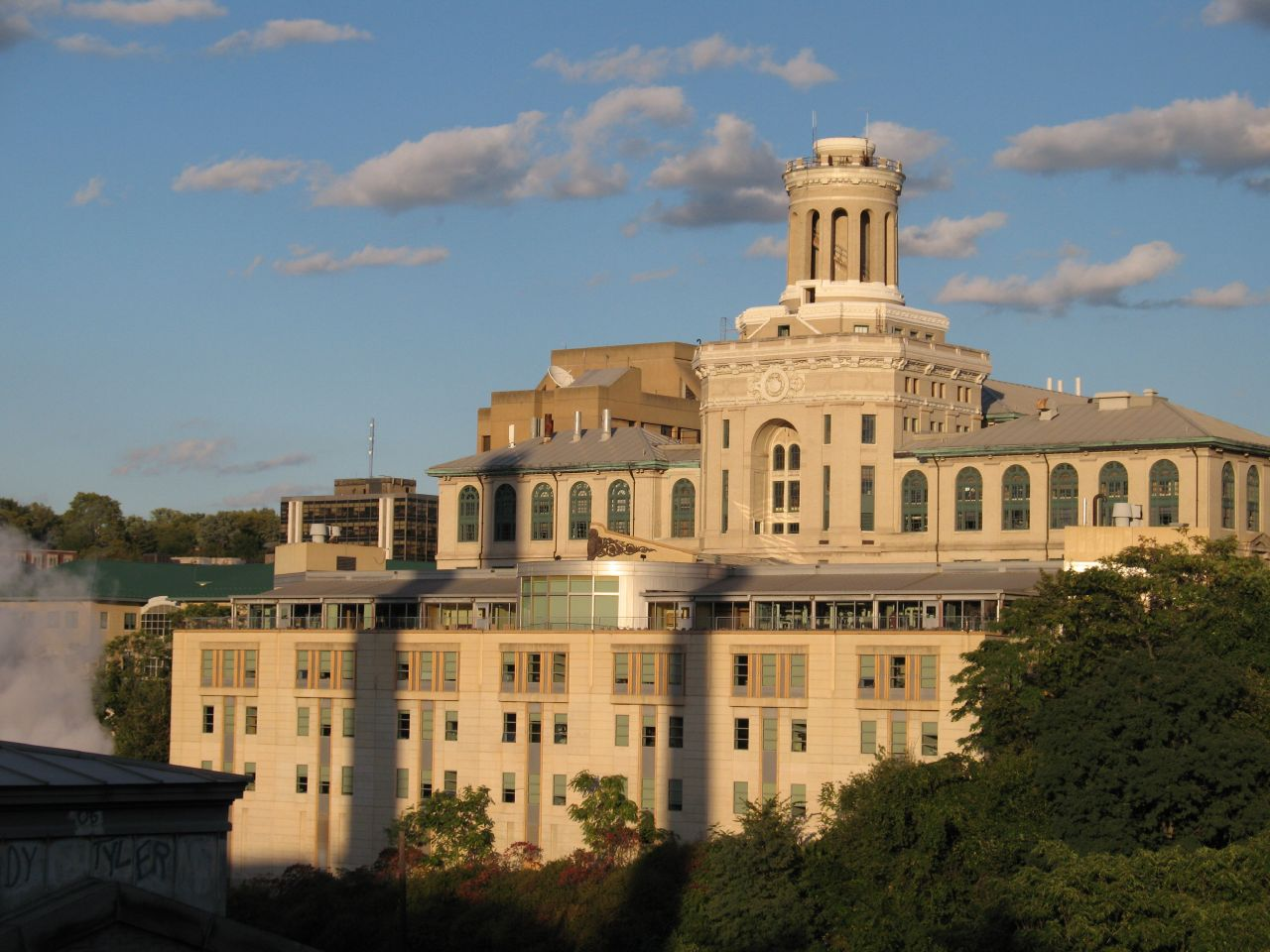
Hamerschlag Hall at Carnegie Mellon University, Pittsburgh

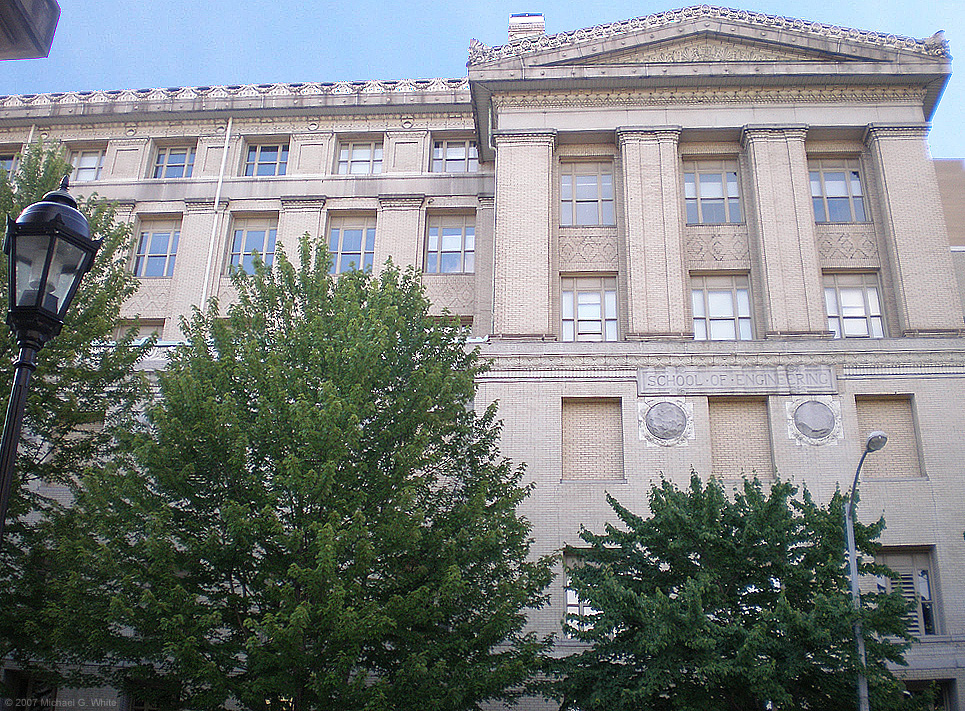
Thaw Hall at the University of Pittsburgh

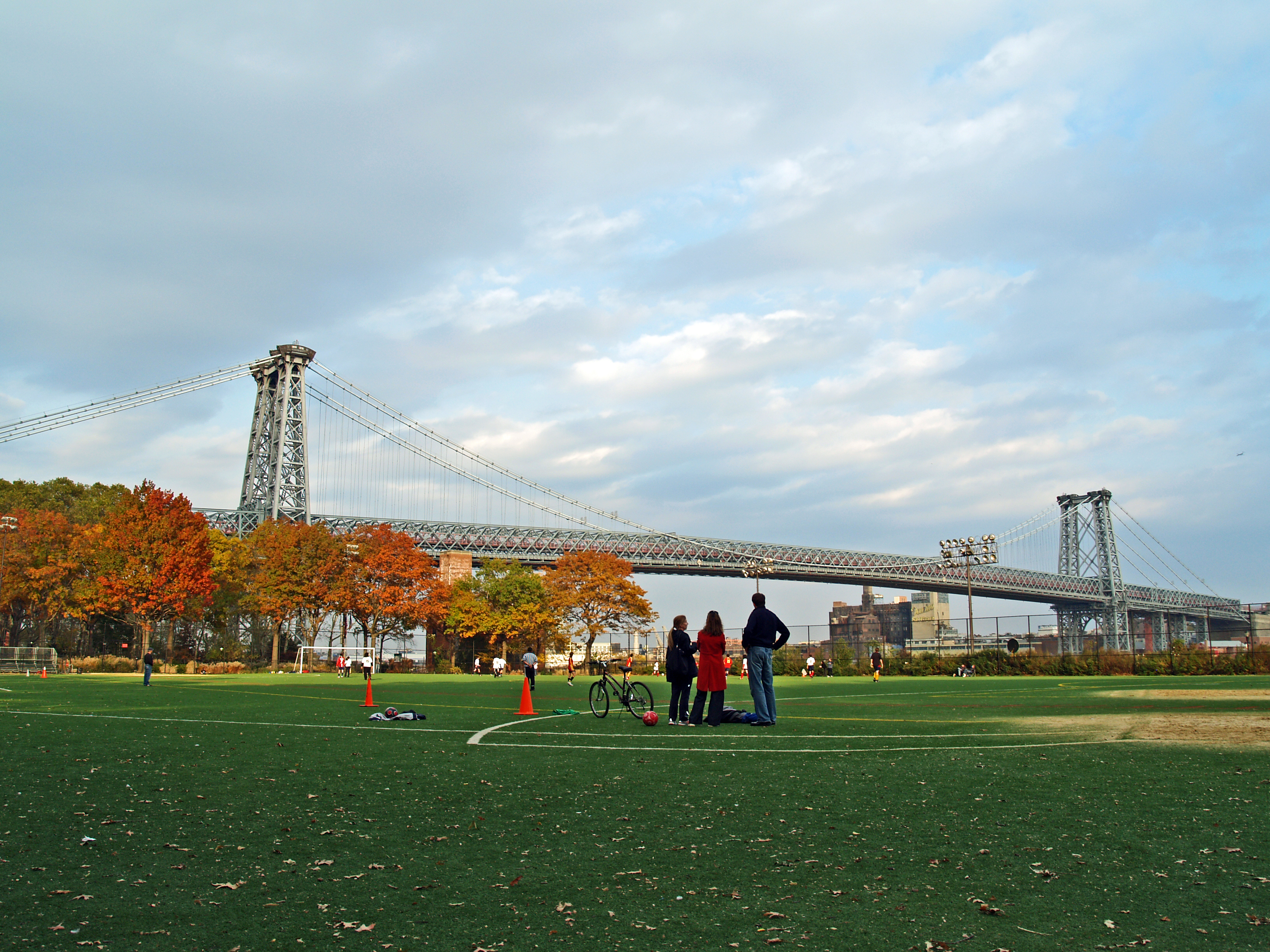
Williamsburg Bridge, New York City

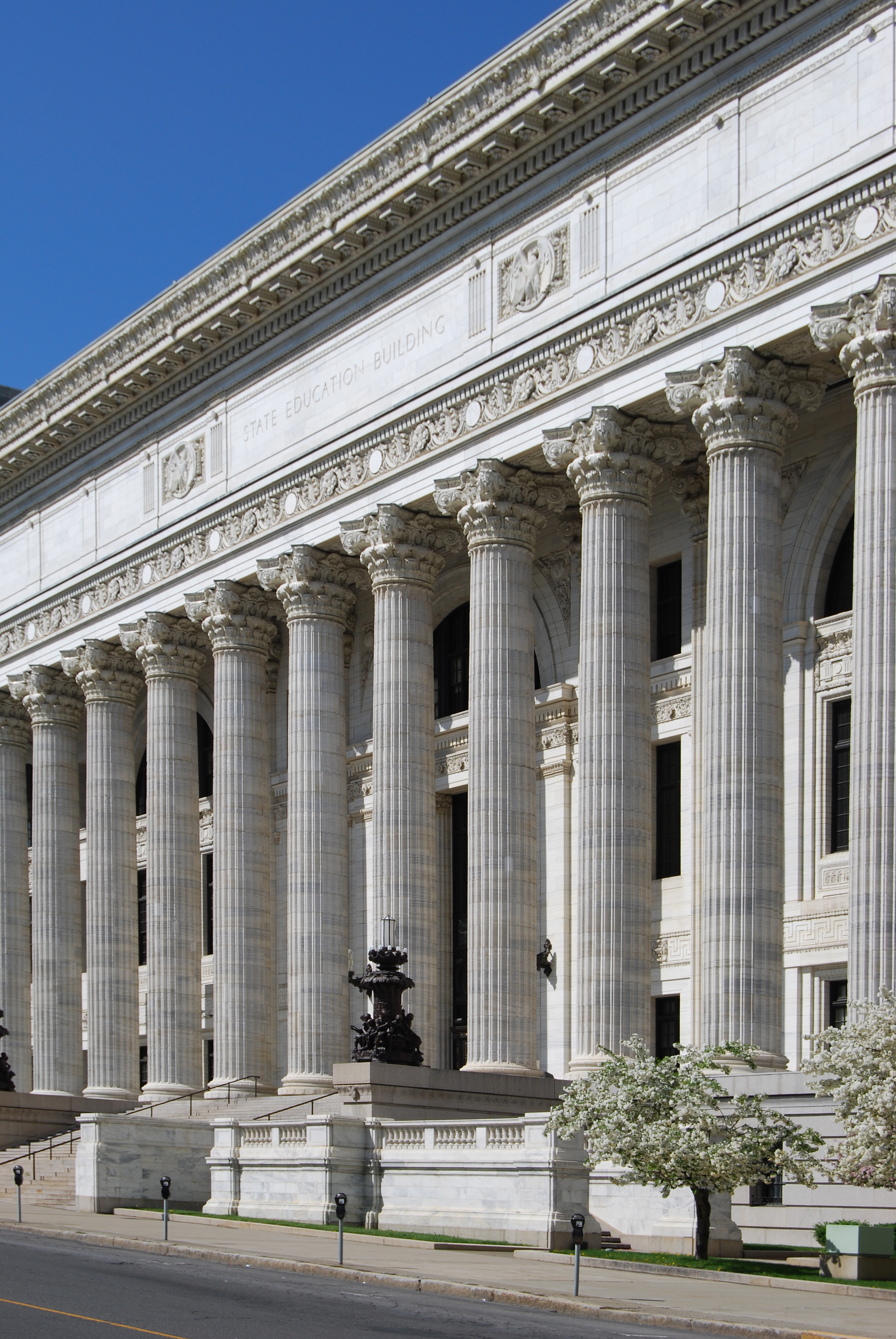
New York State Education Department Building, Albany, New York

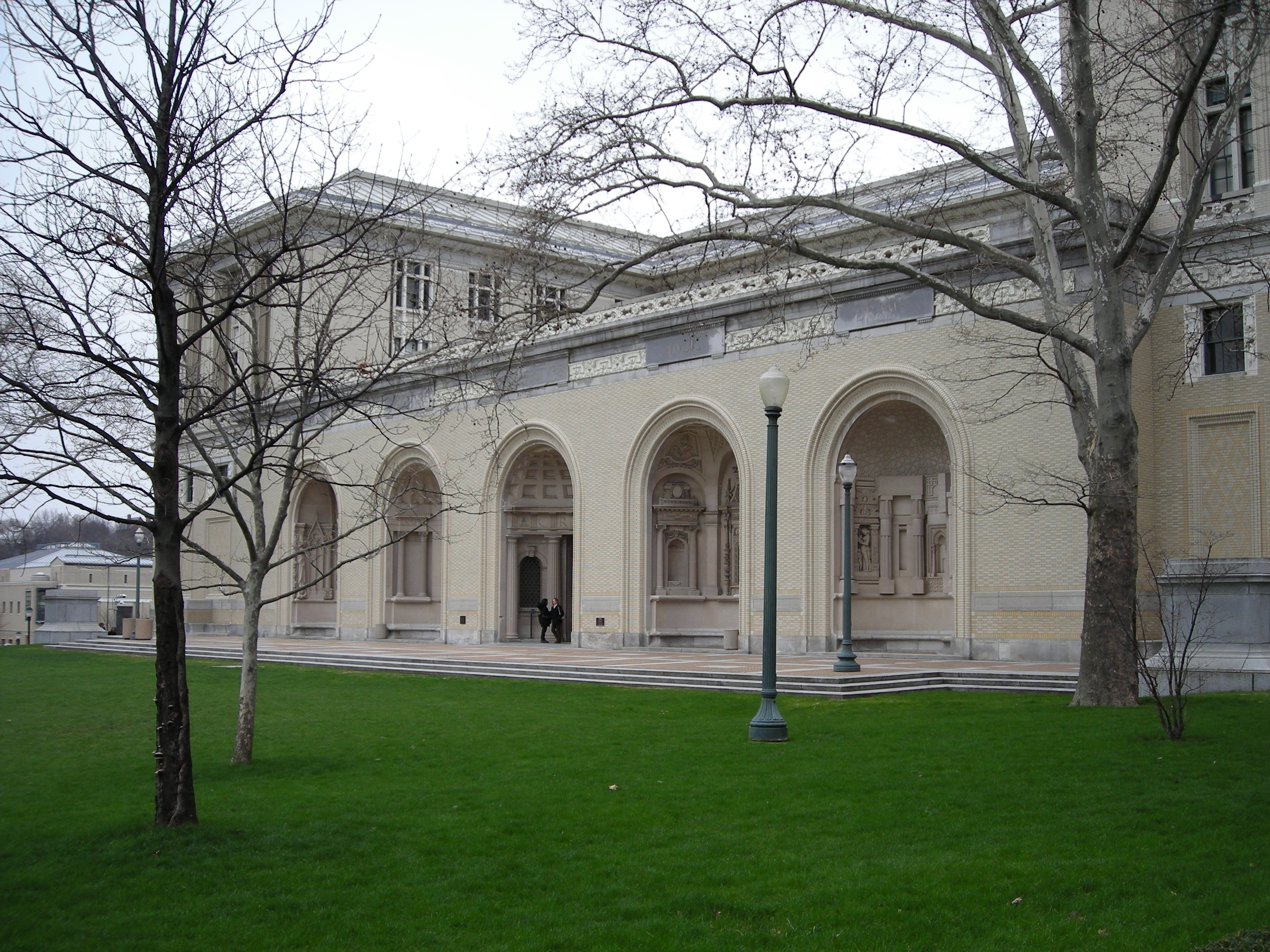
Carnegie Mellon College of Fine Arts, Pittsburgh

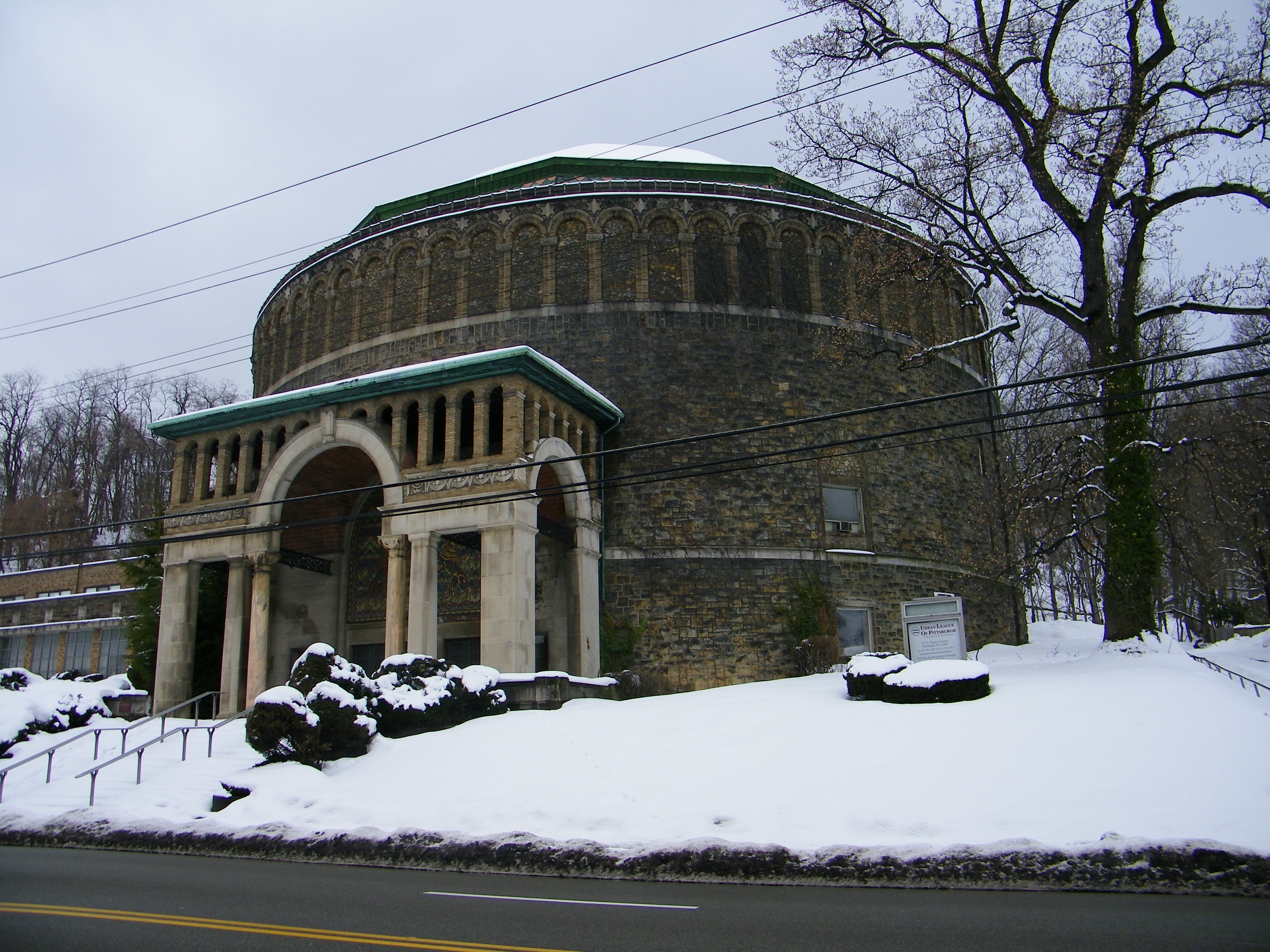
Congregation B'nai Israel (Urban League of Pittsburgh Charter School), Henry Hornbostel, with William S. Fraser, Philip Friedman, and Alexander Sharove

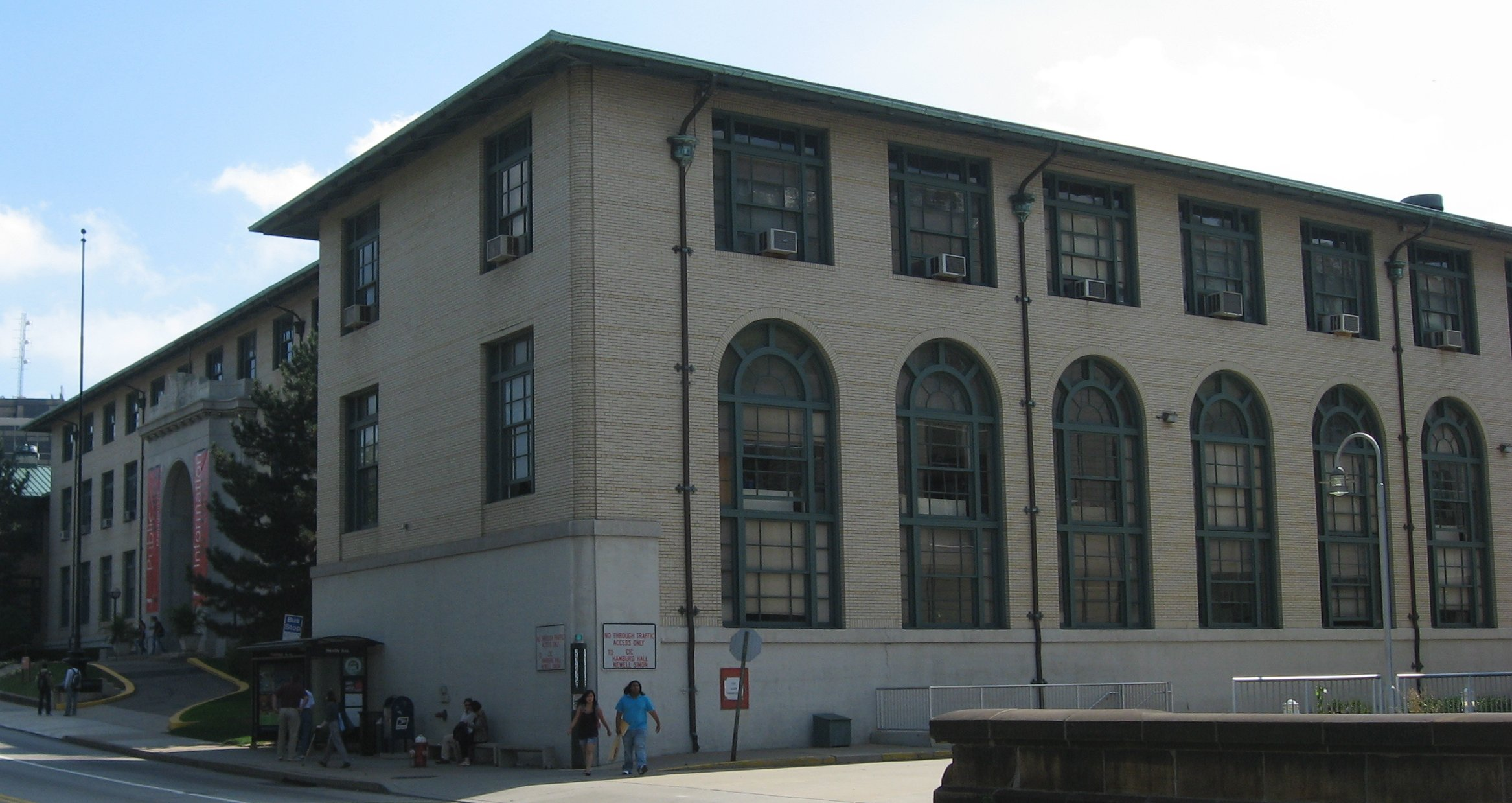
Hamburg Hall (U.S. Bureau of Mines), Carnegie Mellon Heinz College, Pittsburgh

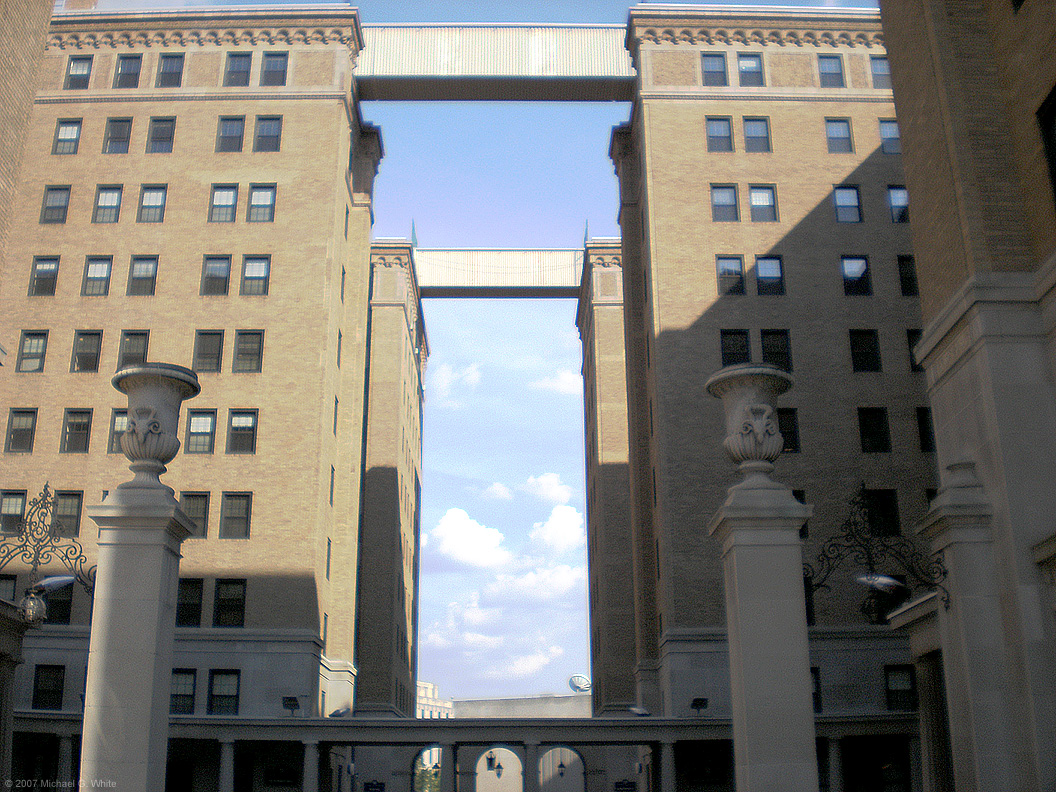
Schenley Apartments. Henry Hornbostel, with Rutan & Russell

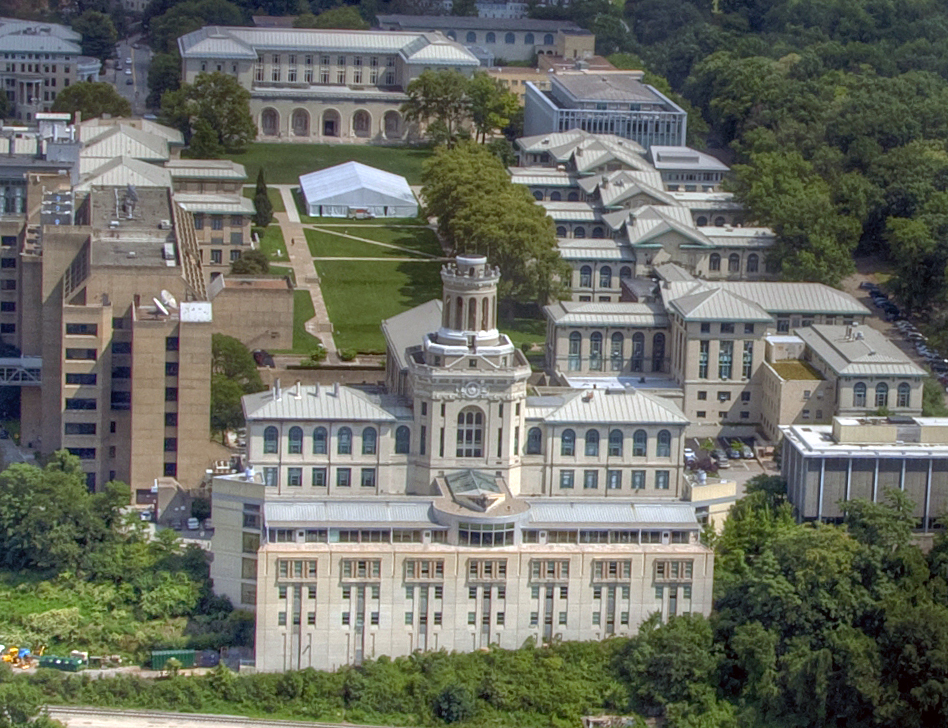
Carnegie Mellon University, the original campus (Carnegie Institute of Technology; Carnegie Technical Schools), Palmer & Hornbostel, Henry Hornbostel

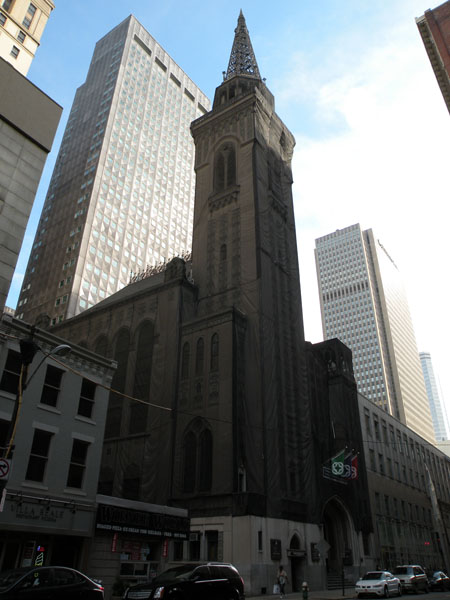
Smithfield Congregational (United) Church (later Smithfield United Church of Christ), Pittsburgh

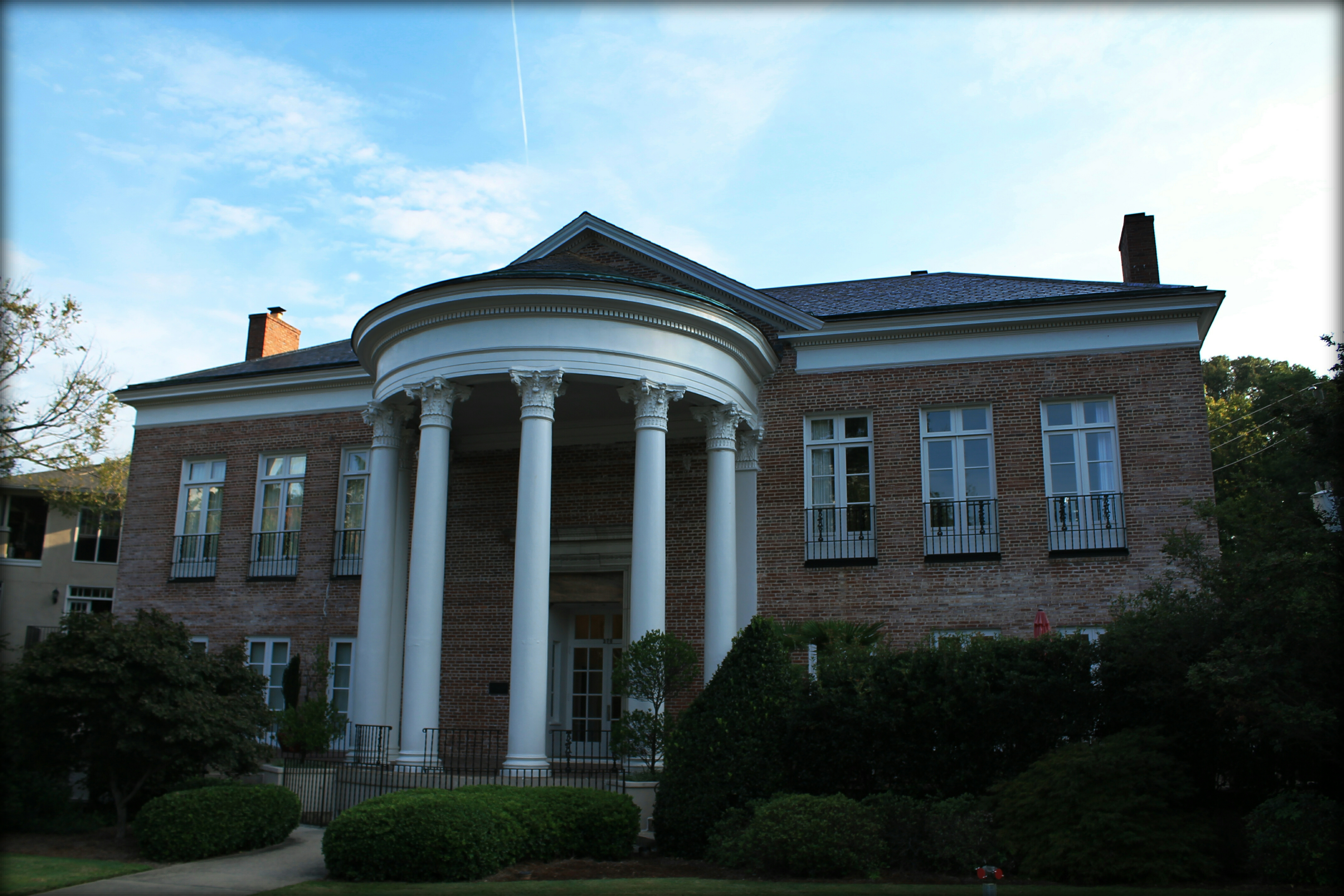
Habersham Memorial Hall, Atlanta, Georgia

Among his many landmarks are:

- Rodef Shalom Temple, Pittsburgh (1904)
- Soldiers and Sailors National Military Museum and Memorial, Pittsburgh (1907)
- The Harding Memorial, the tomb of President Warren Harding
- Pittsburgh City-County Building, (1915–1917, with Edward B. Lee)
- At his alma mater, St. Anthony Hall fraternity, New York (Building #96000484 listed as "Delta Psi, Alpha Chapter" .

Hornbostel is also noted for his work on the Queensboro Bridge (1909), and the Hell Gate Bridge (1916) done jointly with Gustav Lindenthal. In 1917, Hornbostel co-authored an urban planning proposal for the city of Johnstown, Pennsylvania, titled Johnstown: A City Practicable.
