= Islamic Center of Pittsburgh =

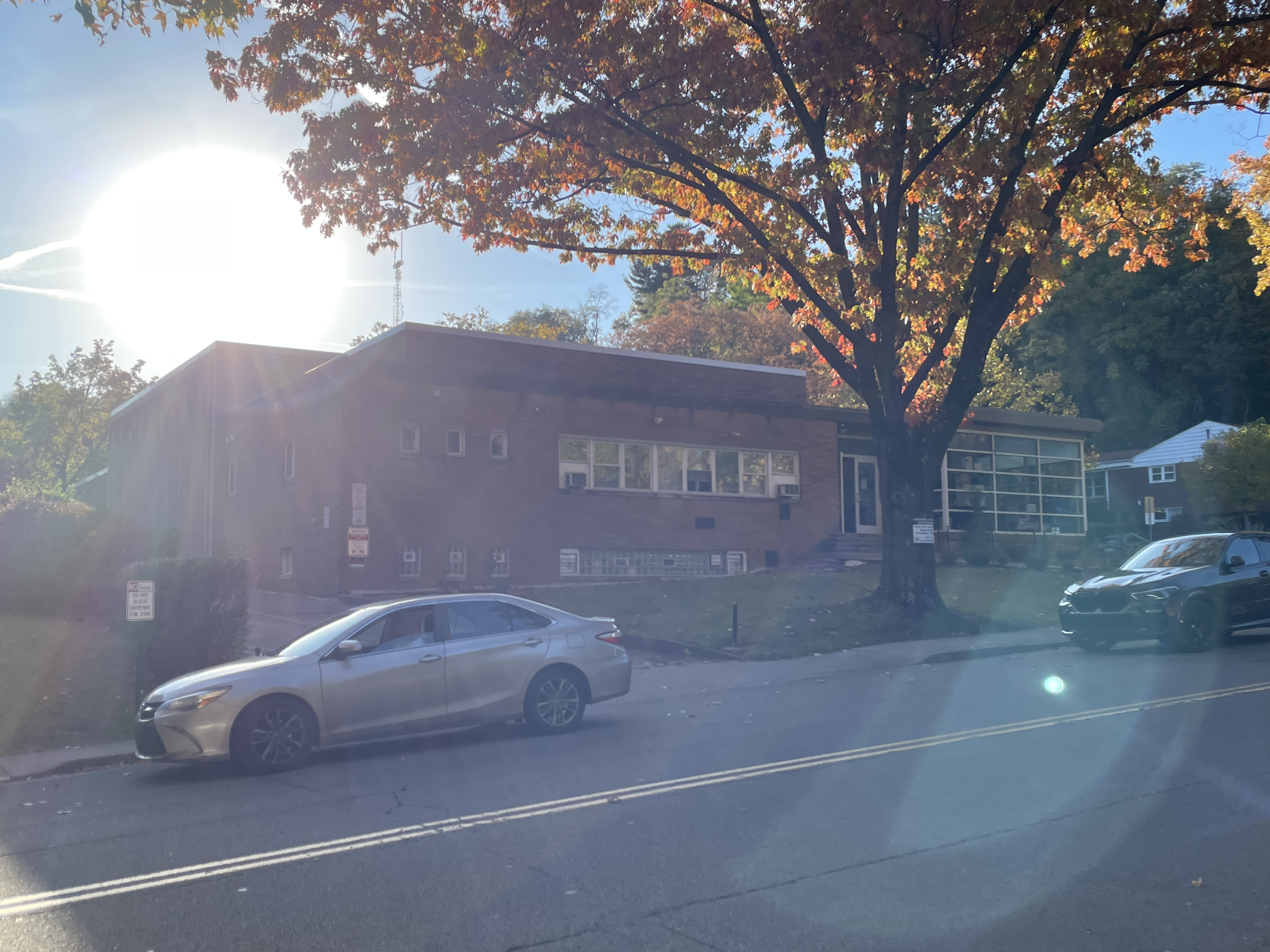

Religion
- Leadership: Mohcine Eljoufri, Executive Director

Location
- Location: 4100 Bigelow Blvd. Pittsburgh, Pennsylvania, US
- Interactive map of Islamic Center of Pittsburgh
- Coordinates: 40.4488°N 79.9557°W

Website
- www.icp-pgh.org

The Islamic Center of Pittsburgh is an Islamic educational, social services, and community outreach organization in the Oakland neighborhood of Pittsburgh, Pennsylvania. Founded in 1989, it is the largest mosque in the city, attracting 600 to 700 participants for weekly prayers. It provides social services for people of all religious backgrounds and engages in educational outreach and interfaith dialogue to foster community understanding and cooperation.

== Mosque ==
The Islamic Center of Pittsburgh (ICP) was founded in 1989 in the Oakland neighborhood of Pittsburgh, Pennsylvania. It is the largest mosque in the city, regularly attracting 600 to 700 participants for the weekly prayer service. In December 2016, average attendance at Friday prayers was 750 participants.

== Activities ==
ICP is actively involved in education, social services, and community outreach, extending its services to Muslims and non-Muslims in Western Pennsylvania, Eastern Ohio, and Northern West Virginia. Its educational programs include workshops on Islamic practice, a Muslim youth center, a Sunday school, and a support group for converts to Islam. On the social services front, ICP operates a monthly food pantry in conjunction with the Greater Pittsburgh Food Bank. This service is open to both Muslims and non-Muslims.

In response to anti-Muslim rhetoric and Islamophobia, ICP has engaged in numerous community outreach initiatives. It offers an "Islam 101" course educating non-Muslims about the tenets and practices of Islam, and a course guiding non-Muslims to support and ally with those who practice Islam. It makes itself available to the media and participates in community panels to dispel myths about Islam. Following the 2015 San Bernardino attack in California, ICP hosted a series of interfaith dinners. A local Reform Jewish congregation, Temple Sinai, reciprocates by hosting ICP members for an annual Shabbat service and dinner.

=== Interfaith relations ===
ICP engages in interfaith dialogue with other faith groups and secular organizations. It holds an annual Humanity Day awards ceremony during Ramadan, which honors Pittsburgh citizens who advance interfaith relations. ICP regularly extends invitations to members of other religious congregations, including Jewish and Lutheran, to tour its mosque.

Following the mass shooting at the Tree of Life synagogue in neighboring Squirrel Hill, ICP joined with two Muslim nonprofits to open a LaunchGood crowdfunding page to help pay for the burial of the victims and survivors' medical bills, with the funds to be distributed by ICP. As of November 1, the page has exceeded $220,000 in contributions.

== See also ==
- List of mosques in the Americas
- Lists of mosques
- List of mosques in the United States
