= Underground Printing =

American retail company in Michigan

- Company type: Private
- Website type: Online Custom Apparel and Accessories, eCommerce
- Available in: English
- Founded: 2001, Ann Arbor, Michigan
- Headquarters: Ypsilanti, Michigan
- No. of locations: 30 (April 2022)
- Area served: United States
- Founders: Ryan Gregg; Rishi Narayan
- CEO: Ryan Gregg
- Industry: Customized Apparel and Accessories
- Products: T-shirts, Apparel, Accessories
- Revenue: ~US $25-50 million
- Employees: 200+
- Website: www.undergroundshirts.com

Underground Printing is an American retail company located in Ypsilanti MI, that makes custom apparel such as t shirts, sweatshirts, hoodies, hats and promotional products.

== History ==
Underground Printing, first known as A-1 Screenprinting, was founded in 2001 by childhood friends Rishi Narayan and Ryan Gregg while they were undergraduates at the University of Michigan. The company would become known as Underground Printing in 2004 upon the acquisition of a company with that name. In 2006, they opened their first retail store in Ann Arbor. Since then, the U of M Alumni have grown their small business into a company with over 200 employees and 30 retail locations.

In 2019, the company was named to the Inc. 5000 list, a list noting the 5000 fastest-growing private companies in the U.S., for a ninth consecutive year.

== Services ==
Underground Printing provides a range of custom apparel and promotional product services. These include screen printing, embroidery, and direct-to-garment digital printing for both large and small orders. The company also offers warehousing, order fulfillment, and print-on-demand solutions for online stores and group orders.

== Fundraising ==
In 2018, they partnered with the Pittsburgh Steelers to produce ‘Stronger Than Hate’ shirts in the wake of the Tree of Life synagogue shooting. The t-shirts were available in Pittsburgh retail stores and proceeds from the sale of any products with the ‘Stronger Than Hate’ logo went directly to the victims of the tragedy.

During the COVID-19 pandemic, in March 2020, Underground Printing sold ‘Flatten the Curve’ t-shirts in which proceeds directly benefited local businesses in towns like Ann Arbor, MI, Madison, WI, Evanston, IL, Iowa City, IA, Morgantown, WV, Grand Rapids, MI, and New Windsor, MD.

== 20th Anniversary ==
In 2021, UGP celebrated their 20th anniversary. Since the beginning, Underground Printing has managed to become one of the largest custom printed apparel providers in the country with more than 200 employees at 30 locations across 13 states. On average, UGP prints 10,000 T-shirts a day at its production facility.

== Growth ==
In May 2021, UGP moved its corporate headquarters to Ypsilanti, MI. The new production facility is three times larger than Underground Printing's previous facility, measuring at 172,000 square-feet. The new space, which can also accommodate over 1,600 employees, is a newer build, while their former location was built in the 60s. "We took a big, big step and we're really excited about it because we don't have to think about space for growth hopefully for a while now," said Narayan.

In 2024, Underground Printing expanded to its westernmost location by opening a new store in Boulder, Colorado. This marked the company’s first retail presence in the state of Colorado, continuing its trend of nationwide growth in the custom apparel market.
