= The Tree of Life Center for Humanity =

Anti-antisemitism nonprofit

Logo on the fence surrounding the site

The Tree of Life Center for Humanity is a nonprofit organization created to counter antisemitism and as a memorial to those murdered in the Pittsburgh synagogue shooting, in which 11 people were murdered and six wounded on October 27, 2018, in the deadliest attack on a local Jewish community in U.S. history.

The organization takes its name from Tree of Life – Or L'Simcha Congregation in the Squirrel Hill neighborhood of Pittsburgh, Pennsylvania. Two other congregations, New Light Congregation and Congregation Dor Hadash, also worshipped in the building and were affected by the attack that took place during Sabbath worship services. The Tree of Life building was partially demolished in 2024. The new center is to include the memorial to the victims, a Center for Jewish Life & Culture focused on community-wide programs, a Museum and Education Center, and an Institute for Countering Hate & Antisemitism.

Carole Zawatsky was hired as CEO in 2022. At the time she said, "There is no other institution in American Jewish life built on the site where history actually happened. In and of itself, that’s incredibly powerful.”

Architect Daniel Libeskind was hired to design the new structure and the memorial, which was designed in collaboration with victims' family members and the affected congregations.
