= Murder of Neal Rosenblum =

Anti-semitic hate crime

- Location: Pittsburgh, Pennsylvania, U.S.
- Date: April 17, 1986; 40 years ago
- Attack type: Homicide by shooting
- Victim: Neal Rosenblum
- Perpetrators: Steven M. Tielsch; Kevin Ohm (potential accomplice)
- Motive: Antisemitism
- Charges: Third-degree murder
- Sentence: 10–20 years in prison

Neal Rosenblum was shot and killed on April 17, 1986, by Steven M. Tielsch in Pittsburgh. The attack was motivated by antisemitic hate.

== Personal life ==
Neal Rosenblum was the third of five children in an Orthodox Jewish family in Toronto, Canada. He was a rabbinical and computer science student. He married Manya Weingarten of the Squirrel Hill neighborhood of Pittsburgh in the spring of 1985. As a devout Orthodox Jew, he prayed three times daily, attending services at synagogue or at Jewish schools.

== Shooting ==
A month after their daughter was born, the family visited Mrs. Rosenblum's parents, intending to stay for Passover. Rosenblum was 24 or 25 years old at the time.

A few hours after arriving at his in-laws' house in Squirrel Hill, Rosenblum went to pray the evening services at the Kollel Bais Yitzchok Torah Institute Study Center. As he walked home from the synagogue, a car pulled up with Steven Tielsch and his friend Kevin Ohm, and engaged him in conversation. Tielsch then shot him five times. He was killed because of his Jewish appearance, wearing Haredi attire such as a black fedora.

Rosenblum was still conscious when emergency workers arrived, and he provided some details of the attack. He died about five hours later while in surgery at University of Pittsburgh Medical Center.

Investigators were unable to develop leads for 12 years. Kevin Ohm was questioned about being present the night Rosenblum was killed. On August 10, 1991, Ohm, 26, was killed in a car accident with Tielsch after the latter crashed his car while speeding. Tielsch was later convicted of vehicular homicide for this incident and served time in prison.

== Development of case ==
In 1988, Tielsch and Sanford Gordon shared a cell in the Allegheny County jail, both on separate drug charges. Tielsch bragged that he had killed a Jew and would often make antisemitic remarks and draw swastikas on himself. Gordon reported the information to the authorities, but they did not have enough evidence to make the case in 2000. At that time, the Cold Case Squad took over the investigation and got a corroborating witness. Fourteen years after the original crime, police arrested the now 38-year-old killer.

=== Trials ===
Gordon was the star witness in all the trials. In the first three trials, an extensive roster of witnesses was used, many of them jailhouse informants or otherwise unsavory characters. For the fourth trial, the prosecutor streamlined the case, using more technologically advanced presentation such as PowerPoint and far fewer witnesses, concluding the proceedings in half the amount of time.

Tielsch's leg tattoo of a swastika was not admitted into evidence. His attorney argued that it could not be proven that he had already had the swastika at the time of the murder.

Tielsch's first three trials ended in a deadlocked jury. He was convicted of third-degree murder in a fourth trial in 2002, with a sentence of 10 to 20 years. The judge in the latter trial, Lawrence O'Toole, declared that the jury was giving the defendant a break by limiting charges to 3rd degree murder. The Supreme Court of Pennsylvania upheld the decision in 2007.

Tielsch was released from prison on October 23, 2017, after serving 15 years of the maximum 20.

== Media ==
The prosecutorial doggedness in pursuing multiple trials generated controversy. The prosecutor explained it as due to the heinous nature of a hate crime, while the local newspaper rejected the idea that hate crimes deserved special treatment. The newspaper's response drew public criticism.

After the Pittsburgh synagogue mass shooting in 2018 that killed 11 and injured 6, major media revisited the Rosenblum murder, which was also an antisemitic shooting attack that took place in the same neighborhood, and one in which the shooter also had no relationship with the victim.

== See also ==
- Murder of Blaze Bernstein
- Lynching of Leo Frank
- History of the Jews in Pittsburgh
- History of antisemitism in the United States
- Poway synagogue shooting
- Los Angeles Jewish Community Center shooting
- Overland Park Jewish Community Center shooting
- Atlanta Hebrew Benevolent Congregation Temple bombing
- United States Holocaust Memorial Museum shooting
- Seattle Jewish Federation shooting
- List of synagogue shootings
