= Pittsburgh synagogue shooting =

2018 mass shooting in Pennsylvania, U.S.

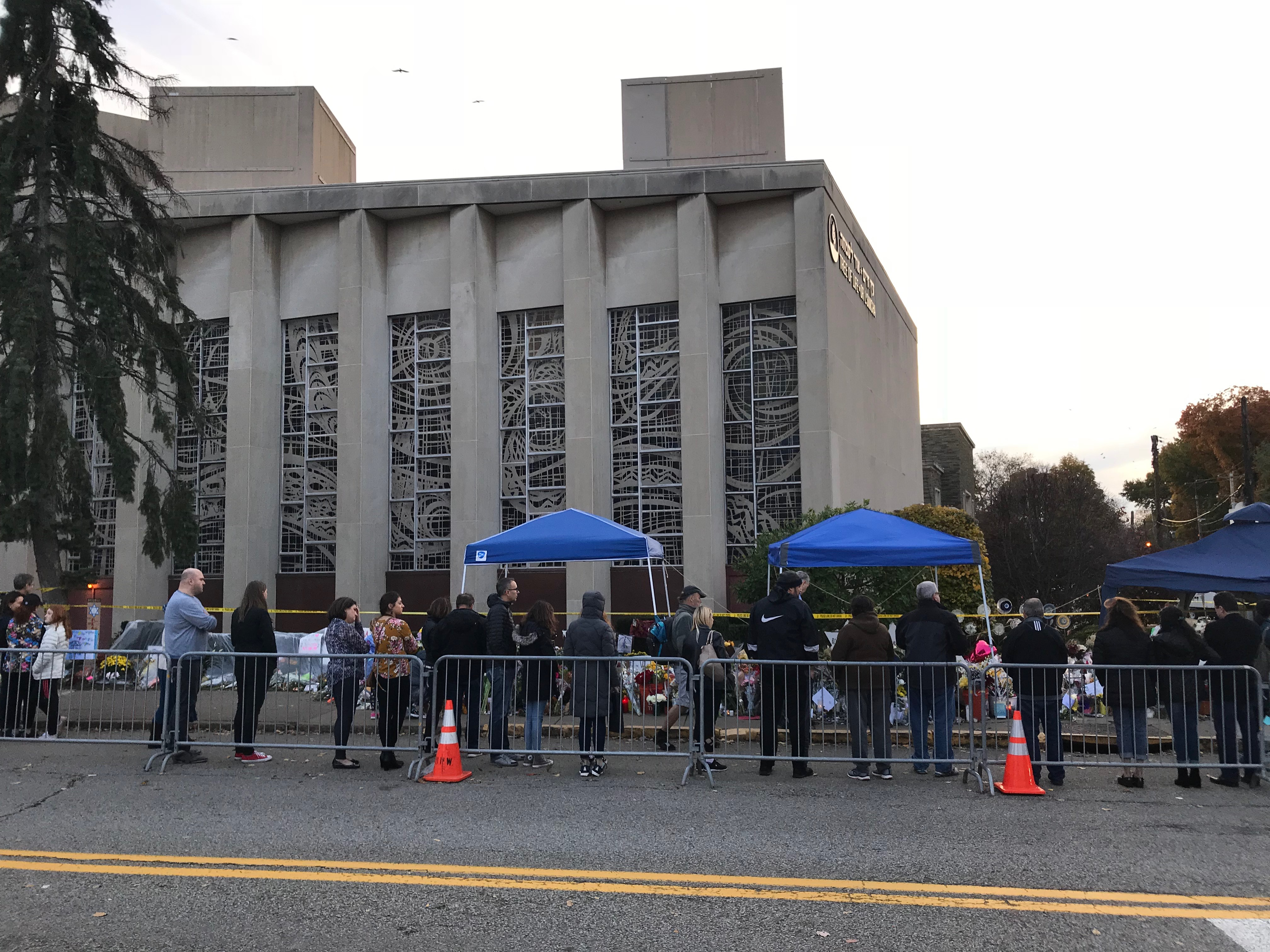
- People visit the memorials to victims of the mass shooting outside the Tree of Life synagogue on November 4, 2018
- Location: 40°26′37″N 79°55′17″W; Tree of Life – Or L'Simcha Congregation, 5898 Wilkins Avenue, Pittsburgh, Pennsylvania, U.S.
- Date: October 27, 2018; 8 years ago 9:54 – 11:08 a.m. (EDT)
- Attack type: Mass shooting
- Weapons: Colt AR-15 SP1 semi-automatic rifle; Three Glock .357 SIG semi-automatic pistols (only one used); Mossberg 590A1 12-gauge pump-action shotgun (unused)
- Deaths: 11
- Injuries: 8 (including the perpetrator and one due to glass fragments)
- Perpetrator: Robert Bowers
- Motive: Antisemitism, belief in the white genocide conspiracy theory, white supremacy
- Charges: 36 state criminal counts
- Verdict: Federal: Guilty on all counts
- Convictions: 63 federal criminal counts (Note: Obstruction of free exercise of religious beliefs resulting in death (11 counts); Hate crimes resulting in death (11 counts); Obstruction of free exercise of religious beliefs involving an attempt to kill and use of a dangerous weapon and resulting in bodily injury (2 counts); Hate crimes involving an attempt to kill (2 counts); Obstruction of free exercise of religious beliefs involving an attempt to kill and use of a dangerous weapon, and resulting in bodily injury to public safety officers (8 counts); Obstruction of free exercise of religious beliefs involving use of a dangerous weapon and resulting in bodily injury to public safety officers (4 counts); Discharge of a firearm during these crimes of violence (25 counts))
- Sentence: Federal: Death

On October 27, 2018, an antisemitic mass shooting occurred at the Tree of Life – Or L'Simcha Congregation synagogue in the Squirrel Hill neighborhood of Pittsburgh, Pennsylvania, United States. The congregation, along with New Light Congregation and Congregation Dor Hadash, which also worshiped in the building, was attacked during Shabbat morning services. The perpetrator, 46-year-old Robert Gregory Bowers, killed eleven people and wounded six, in the deadliest attack on a local Jewish community in American history.

After being shot multiple times by police, Bowers was arrested at the scene. Bowers had earlier posted antisemitic comments against HIAS (formerly, Hebrew Immigrant Aid Society) on the online alt-tech social network Gab. Dor Hadash had participated in HIAS's National Refugee Shabbat the previous week. Referring to Central American migrant caravans and immigrants, Bowers posted a message on Gab in which he wrote that "HIAS likes to bring invaders in that kill our people. I can't sit by and watch my people get slaughtered. Screw your optics, I'm going in." He was charged with 63 federal crimes, some of them capital crimes. Bowers pleaded not guilty. In 2023, he was found guilty on all counts and sentenced to death by lethal injection.

The shooting was widely condemned. President Donald Trump's visit to Pittsburgh in the aftermath of the attack was met by protests, with some blaming him for an upsurge in white nationalist violence. In the years following the attack efforts were made to increase security at American synagogues and other Jewish buildings. Millions of dollars were raised for victims and survivors of the attack. There are plans to build a memorial complex at the site of the shooting.

== Background ==
Tree of Life – Or L'Simcha Congregation is a Conservative Jewish synagogue. The synagogue describes itself as a "traditional, progressive, and egalitarian congregation". It is located in the Squirrel Hill neighborhood of Pittsburgh, Pennsylvania, about 5 miles (8.0 km) east of downtown Pittsburgh. The Squirrel Hill neighborhood is one of the largest predominantly Jewish neighborhoods in the United States and has historically been the center of Pittsburgh's Jewish community. About 26 percent of the city's Jewish population live in the area.

Originally founded as an Orthodox Jewish congregation in 1864 in downtown Pittsburgh, by an early group of Jewish immigrants, Tree of Life merged in 2010 with the recently founded Congregation Or L'Simcha. The modern synagogue building, located at the intersection of Wilkins and Shady avenues in Squirrel Hill, was built in 1953. The congregation also rents space to Dor Hadash, (Note: Hebrew: דוֹר חָדָשׁ) a Reconstructionist congregation; and New Light, another Conservative congregation. The synagogue's main sanctuary has a capacity of 1,250 people.

Squirrel Hill has a low crime rate and is not generally regarded as racially tense. However, local rabbinic student Neal Rosenblum was murdered in the neighborhood in 1986 in an antisemitic hate crime.

This 2018 mass shooting took place soon after Columbia University and the Anti-Defamation League independently reported a spike in antisemitic activity online, especially on the popular social networking platforms Instagram and Twitter. In addition, other antisemitic acts had been committed elsewhere.

The immediate rise in the months of August to October 2018 was attributed to rising tensions associated with advertising for the 2018 U.S. midterm elections. A similar rise in online attacks had occurred during the 2016 US election, with the midterms being a "rallying point" for far-right extremists to organize efforts to spread antisemitism online among the populace. In 2017, there was a 57% rise in antisemitic incidents in the United States, in context of rising hate crimes against other groups, including Muslims and African Americans, as reported by the FBI. For instance, hundreds of Jewish gravestones were vandalized in Pennsylvania and Missouri, and antisemitic incidents on university campuses doubled in number.

In August 2017, the widely publicized Unite the Right rally in Charlottesville, Virginia featured Nazi symbols, salutes, and the slogan "Blood and Soil", among other racist and antisemitic rhetoric. Considerable antisemitic material was being spread online via conspiracy theories about wealthy Jewish individuals, including billionaire George Soros. Columbia University's Jon Albright said that these represented the "worst sample" of all the hate speech he had seen on Instagram.

On the morning of the massacre, at 8:57 a.m., Bowers booted up his custom Linux-based computer. He set up several commands to start a process that would wipe the data of his six hard drives after a 200-minute countdown. The process involved using a "blkdiscard" command on one of his hard drives before shredding the first 8 gigabytes of the five other hard drives. By the time the FBI raided his home, the 200-minute countdown was already over and 2 terabytes of data from his computer were permanently lost. Before the shooting, Bowers also wiped most of the data on his cellphone, which the FBI could not recover.

== Shooting ==
At 9:45 a.m. EDT (13:45 UTC), three religious services were underway in the Tree of Life synagogue, which housed three distinct congregations. Tree of Life and New Light had both begun independent Shabbat morning service in the Pervin Chapel and basement, respectively. The Dor Hadash congregants were gathered near the front of the building, prior to their 10:00 a.m. Torah study session. At around the same time, a car belonging to the gunman was parked in front of the synagogue in a disabled parking space. The car was loaded with five guns, including a Mossberg shotgun that was left in the car, hearing protection, three shooting glasses, a large green bag containing ammunition for both the rifle and shotgun, and ammunition for the Glock pistols. The shooter accessed the website Gab on his phone and posted a final post on his profile at 9:49 a.m.

Five minutes later, a gunman, identified as Robert Bowers and described as a "bearded heavy-set white male", opened fire, entered the building, and was "shooting for about 20 minutes." He was armed with a Colt AR-15 semi-automatic rifle and three Glock .357 SIG semi-automatic pistols. He was dressed in a large red/gray windbreaker over a smaller grey jacket, blue jeans, white sneakers, a light blue shirt, and had a smaller pouch of ammunition on him. Evidence recovered from the scene determined he only fired the Colt rifle and the Glock 31 during the shooting. He also carried several magazines for the rifle and his three Glock handguns: one 40-round .223 magazine, two 20-round .223 magazines, five 15-round .357 magazines, one 13-round .357 magazine, and one 9-round .357 magazine. There would typically be around 75 people in the building on a Saturday morning, but on the day of the shooting, only 22 people were present.

When Bowers got out of his car, he opened fire at a window of the synagogue. Several people in the synagogue heard the first shots. Some hearing the shots did not initially recognize them for what they were: Rabbi Jeffrey Myers, located upstairs, thought a coat rack had fallen and clattered. Bowers entered the synagogue through the shattered window and encountered his first two victims: Jerry Rabinowitz of Dor Hadash and Daniel Leger. Both men had a background in medical work. They both ran downstairs from the lobby to investigate the gunshots and check to see if anyone was hurt. Bowers shot Rabinowitz to death at the lower mezzanine before shooting Leger in the abdomen. Leger fell on the stairs and began bleeding before being rescued 45 minutes later. Just after Rabinowitz and Leger ran downstairs, Irving Younger and Cecil Rosenthal left the Pervin Chapel and went downstairs to investigate the gunshots. Younger was able to reach the lower mezzanine only to be fatally shot by Bowers. He shouted Rosenthal's name before dying. Cecil Rosenthal ran back upstairs and tried running into the Pervin Chapel. Bowers quickly followed Rosenthal and shot him to death just as he reached a doorway to the chapel. Just after entering the chapel, Bowers shot Sylvan Simon, who was next to his wife, in the back before leaving the chapel. By 9:54, police began receiving multiple calls from people barricaded in the building and reporting the attack. The first 911 call was made by Sylvan Simon's wife, Bernice, to report that her husband had been shot at the synagogue.

When the shooting started, Audrey Glickman, Joseph Charny, Rabbi Jeffrey Myers, and David Rosenthal ran to the front of the Pervin Chapel. They decided to hide in an area above the Pervin Chapel. Rosenthal was under distress and exclaimed that he wanted to "go home". Glickman tried stopping him, but to no avail. Rosenthal ran back to the chapel. The other three parted ways with Myers hiding in a bathroom and Glickman and Charny hiding in a clothing donation room. When Bowers was about to go to the basement leading to New Light's service, he encountered David Rosenthal and Joyce Fienberg on the stairs leading to the lower mezzanine. Both of them had accidentally run into Bowers as they were trying to escape. He shot both of them to death.

At 9:55, Melvin Wax, the leader of New Light's services, hid in a pitch-black closet in the storage hallway of the basement along with three other people, including Rabbi Jonathan Perlman who led the congregants to the closet. Around the same time, two other members of New Light, Richard Gottfried and Daniel Stein hid in the basement kitchen. Gottfried made a 911 call at 9:55 which lasted until 9:56. When Bowers reached the basement, he approached the kitchen. In the kitchen, he fired at both Gottfried and Stein through the kitchen island, killing them both. In an interview with a psychologist after the shooting, Bowers referred back to that moment and remarked about how "ironic" it was that he killed both men in front of the ovens of the kitchen. Bowers went back to the main sermon room of the basement and approached the storage hallway. Still unaware of what was happening despite Perlman begging him not to do it, Wax opened the door of the closet and Bowers immediately shot him twice at point-blank range. The latter did not notice the other three congregants who remained in the closet. Just after Bowers shot Wax, one of the congregants called 911 at 9:58. At 9:58, Bowers left the basement and headed back upstairs to go back to his car. Just as he reached the entrance doors, he encountered two police officers at the other side. Bowers immediately opened fire, hitting one of the officers in the hand and injuring the other with shrapnel to the head at 9:58:52 a.m.

Bowers ran back into the mezzanine and went upstairs to target the worshippers at the Pervin Chapel again. He began firing shots at them at 10:01:18 a.m. As Bowers reentered the Pervin Chapel, he approached Andrea Wedner and her mother, Rose Mallinger. Wedner was on the phone with police as Bowers returned to the chapel. Bowers shot both women, killing Mallinger and wounding Wedner with a shot to her right arm. The officer who was injured in the head walked along the synagogue and was able to see Bowers again through a lobby window. Seeing Bowers at the doorway of the Pervin Chapel, he fired five times through the window at Bowers. Bowers fired back at the officer at 10:01:35 a.m. Neither of them hit each other during the brief firefight. Bowers approached the Simons again. During that moment, Bernice was still calling 911 while hugging her now-deceased husband. Bowers shot Bernice to death and shot Sylvan again. The 911 operator on the other end recalled hearing Bernice's agonal breathing. The death of Bernice Simon was recorded at 10:01:48 a.m. When the shooting began, 12 worshippers had gathered for the Shabbat service in the Pervin Chapel. Rabbi Myers helped three of them evacuate the chapel safely. Four of the worshippers left the chapel by themselves, only to be killed by Bowers outside, while four other worshippers remained in the chapel, only to be shot. Out of the 12 worshippers, Bowers shot 8 of them, killing 7 and wounding 1. The 13th worshipper only arrived late while the police were responding to the shooting. Police sources said Bowers shouted at some point during the attack, "All Jews must die!"

About a half-hour later, tactical teams entered the building. They searched the rooms of the synagogue looking for the shooter. Eventually, at 10:53, several officers entered a classroom on the top floor of the synagogue. Bowers opened fire with his rifle and Glock 31, and shot two SWAT members. At the same time, the SWAT team fired shots at Bowers in the dark classroom. Two minutes later, officers engaged in another firefight with Bowers, who was using his Glock handgun because he had no ammunition left for the rifle. He had wounded two officers and two SWAT members, one of them critically. At 11:08, Bowers crawled out of the room and surrendered, having been shot multiple times. As he received medical care in police custody, he allegedly told a SWAT officer that he wanted Jews to die and that Jews were committing genocide against his people. He was searched for weapons and police recovered two unused, loaded Glock handguns that were recovered from a waist holster and ankle holster, and three 15-round .357 magazines. He was also questioned about leaving a clock in the hallway in which Bowers told them that the object was a "Screaming Meanie" trucker alarm clock.

Bowers discharged his rifle 75 times and discharged the Glock 31 17 times during the shooting.

== Victims ==
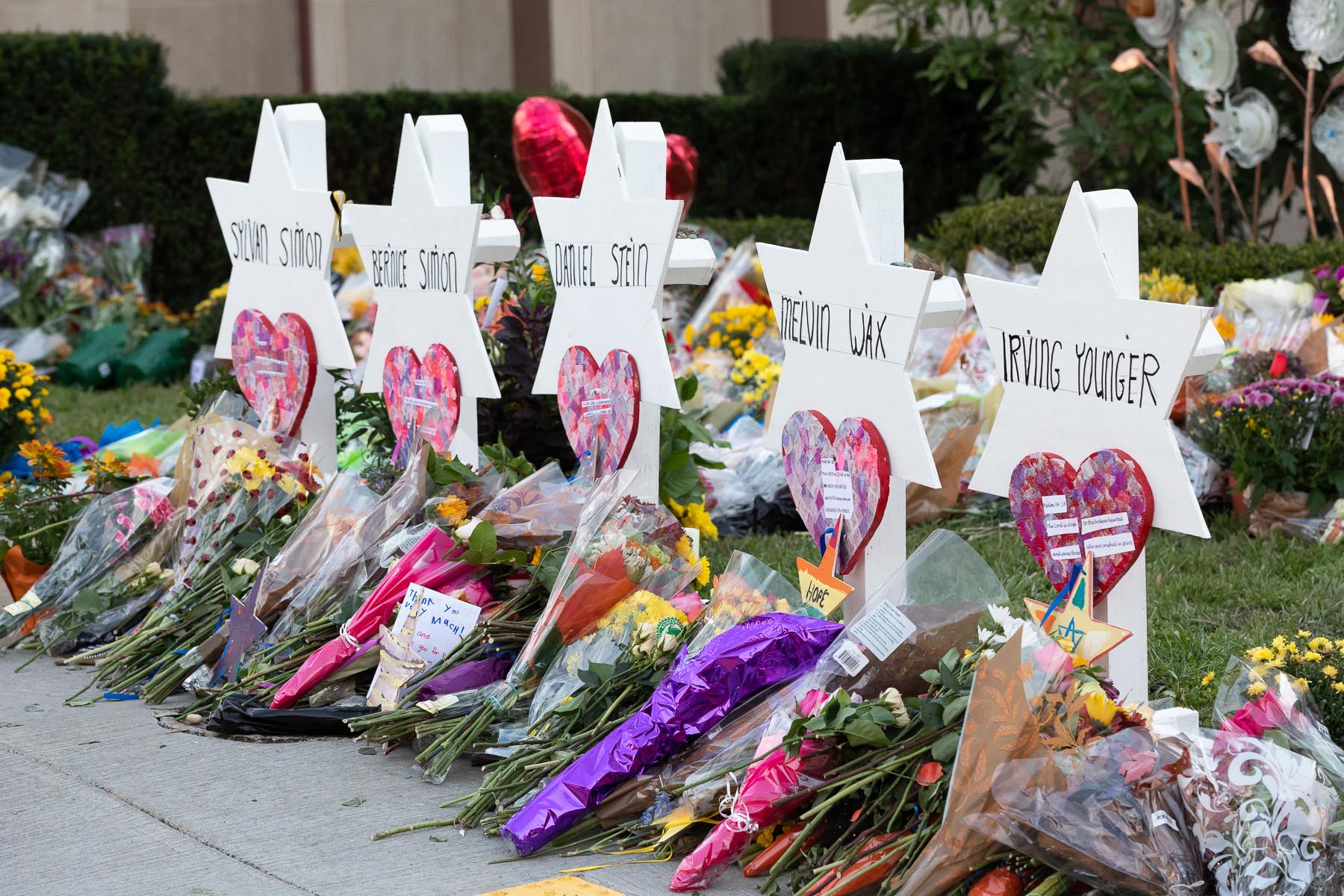
Memorials to victims outside the Tree of Life synagogue

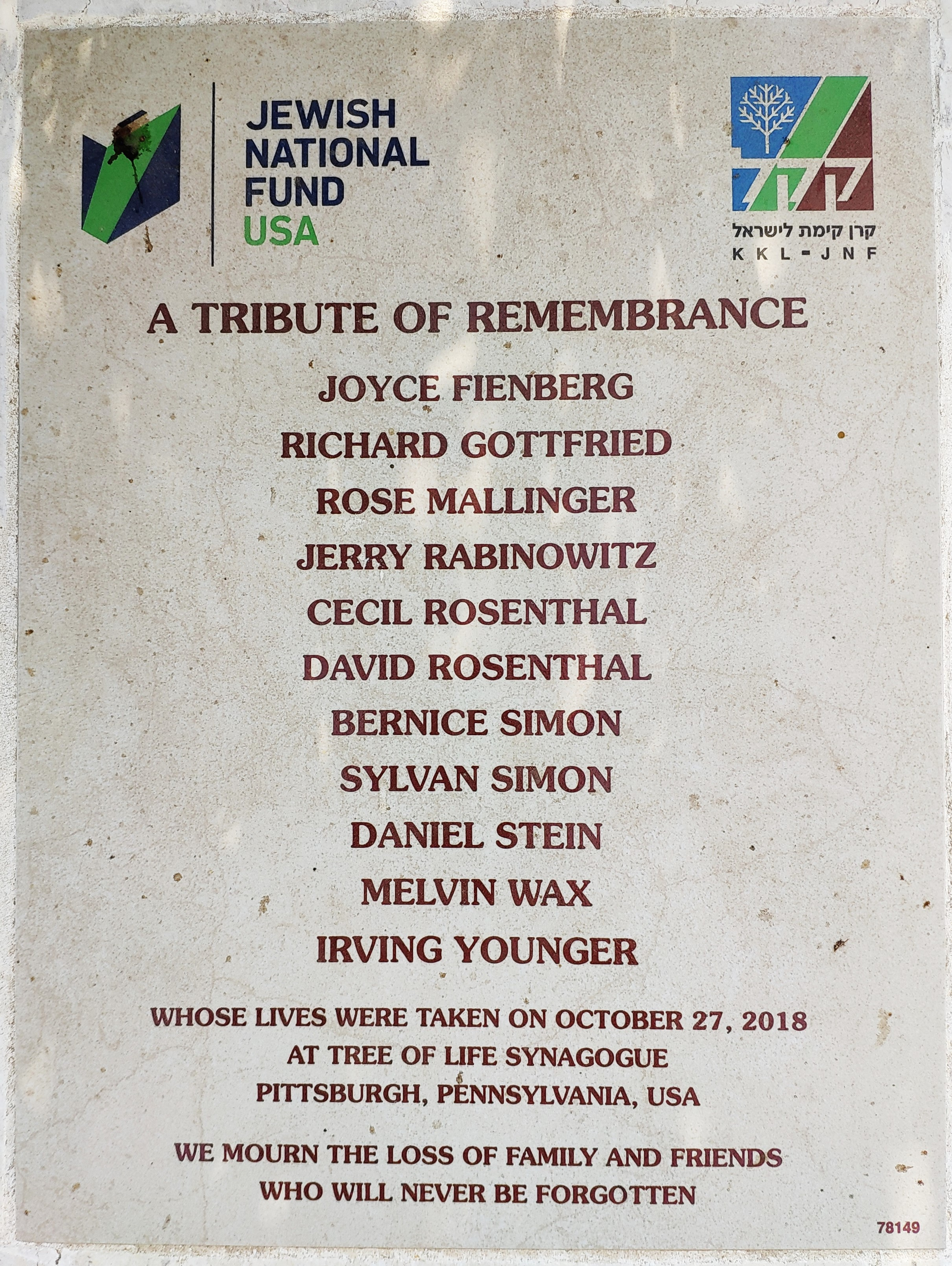
Plaque listing the victims' names by the 9/11 Living Memorial Plaza in Jerusalem

Eleven people were killed, including four on the ground level, four in the Pervin Chapel, and three in the synagogue's basement. All of the victims were killed with the Colt rifle. Among the dead were two brothers and a married couple. Those killed were:

- Joyce Fienberg, 75, a retired University of Pittsburgh research specialist
- Richard Gottfried, 65, a dentist
- Rose Mallinger, 97, an active congregant at the synagogue for more than 60 years
- Jerry Rabinowitz, 65, a family physician
- Cecil, 59 & David Rosenthal, 54, brothers who lived together at a community home for people with disabilities
- Bernice, 84 & Sylvan Simon, 86, a retired couple who celebrated their wedding at Tree of Life in 1956
- Daniel Stein, 71, a retired salesman and substitute school teacher
- Melvin Wax, 87, a retired accountant who was leading services at the time of the shooting
- Irving Younger, 69, a retired real estate company owner, who served as a greeter at the synagogue

Seven others were injured in the incident, with four requiring surgery. Among the injured were three congregants and four police officers (two patrol officers and two SWAT officers; three by ricocheted gunfire and a fourth by glass fragments).

== Perpetrator ==
Robert Gregory Bowers

Robert Gregory Bowers (born September 4, 1972), a resident of Baldwin, Pennsylvania, was arrested after being identified as the shooter. Bowers's parents divorced when he was about one year old, and at 20 months old Bowers experienced sudden speech regression and stopped speaking entirely. When Bowers was seven years old, his father, Randall G. Bowers of the Pittsburgh neighborhood of Garfield, died by suicide on October 15, 1979, at the age of 26 in Tionesta, Pennsylvania, while he was awaiting trial on a rape charge in connection with an April 1979 rape of a 20-year-old woman in Squirrel Hill. Bowers attended Baldwin High School in the Baldwin-Whitehall School District from August 1986 to November 1989. He dropped out of high school before graduation, getting a GED and later working as a trucker for 13 years until 2002. Neighbors described Bowers as "a ghost" who rarely interacted with others.

Bowers was reported to have moved frequently, living at times with his mother, at other times with his grandparents, and alongside various partners of his mother, one of which his mother had met on a dating show. His mother had difficulty holding jobs, and during one period, Bowers slept on a pallet in the kitchen of a one-room apartment. Throughout elementary school, teachers and psychologists repeatedly noted emotional difficulties and behavioral issues. In one of Robert's many hospitalizations, at age 13, Bowers was given a tranquilizer and an antipsychotic before spending 18 hours in four-point restraints leather wrist cuffs attached to a metal frame and another six hours in three-point restraints. Doctors’ notes state he cried and asked to be released during the ordeal, in another hospitalization, a doctor wrote that Bowers was “withdrawn, angry and fearful of his surroundings. He did not comprehend any need to be here but did admit to severe stresses in the home and did not want to be around his mother,”. Bowers's Standardized testing showed high intellectual aptitude (98th and 99th percentile in science and language), but his grades were reported to have deteriorated and his absenteeism grew rapidly over time.

According to accounts which were given by Bowers's coworkers, and analysis of his recent social media posts, his conservatism became radicalized as white nationalism; at one point in the late 1990s, Bowers was fascinated by the right-wing radio host Jim Quinn. At a later time, he became a follower of "aggressive online provocateurs of the right wing's fringe." He was deeply involved in posting comments on social media websites such as Gab and he also promoted antisemitic conspiracy theories on them. Bowers routinely discussed a conspiracy theory that Jews were assisting "evil Muslims" to take over the United States together. In the weeks before the shooting, Bowers made antisemitic posts directed at the HIAS-sponsored National Refugee Shabbat of October 19–20, in which Dor Hadash participated. He claimed Jews were aiding members of Central American caravans moving toward the United States border and referred to those migrants as "invaders". Shortly before the attack, he posted on Gab that "HIAS likes to bring invaders in that kill our people. I can't sit by and watch my people get slaughtered. Screw your optics, (Note: After the 2017 Unite the Right rally, the American far-right was embroiled in debates over "optics," with some favoring violent rhetoric that others saw as damaging to the movement's image.) I'm going in."

== Criminal charges and proceedings ==
=== Federal criminal proceedings ===
==== Indictment and pretrial proceedings ====
Bowers was charged by the U.S. Department of Justice with 29 federal crimes.

Bowers appeared in federal court in Pittsburgh on October 29, 2018, and was ordered held without bail pending trial. Two days later, Bowers was indicted on 44 counts by a federal grand jury. The charges carry a maximum penalty of death or 535 years in federal prison. The counts included hate crimes, 11 counts of obstruction of exercise of religious beliefs resulting in death, 11 counts of use of a firearm to commit murder during a crime of violence, four counts of obstruction of exercise of religious beliefs resulting in bodily injury to a public safety officer, and three counts of use and discharge of a firearm during a crime of violence. On November 1, 2018, Bowers entered a plea of not guilty.

On January 29, 2019, the grand jury indicted Bowers on an additional 19 counts, 13 of which were for hate crimes. On February 11, 2019, Bowers was arraigned in federal court.

Bowers's defense team included two public defenders and criminal defense attorney Judy Clarke, a death penalty expert appointed by the court. The defense offered a plea deal in which Bowers would plead guilty in exchange for a sentence of life imprisonment without parole; federal prosecutors declined, seeking the death penalty instead.

The trial date was not set until various pretrial motions were resolved. In April 2020, Senior U.S. District Judge Donetta Ambrose denied a defense challenge to the federal death penalty. In October 2020, Judge Ambrose denied a defense motion to dismiss charges brought under the Hate Crimes Prevention Act and Church Arson Prevention Act. In November 2021, the defense decided that it would not pursue an insanity defense or intellectual disability defense. In January 2022, after holding an earlier evidentiary hearing, Judge Ambrose denied Bowers's motion to suppress evidence of statements he made after being arrested by police, inside an ambulance, and at the hospital the day of the attack.

After Judge Ambrose retired in February 2022, the case was randomly reassigned to U.S. District Judge Robert J. Colville. In March 2022, Colville denied Bowers's motion for a change of venue.

==== Trial ====
In September 2022, Judge Colville set the trial to begin in April 2023, rejecting a bid by the defense to delay the trial until December 2023. In March 2023, members of the jury pool began completing questionnaires. The jury selection process began on April 24 with twelve jurors and six alternates being selected.

The trial began May 30, 2023. Prosecutors called sixty witnesses, while the defense did not call any witnesses. The witnesses who testified included survivors of the attack, including congregants and Rabbi Jeffrey Myers. Evidence presented to the jury included recordings of 9-1-1 calls as the attacks unfolded (including from some of the people killed), and testimony from police officers who ultimately subdued the gunman; from expert witnesses on medicine, guns, and computers; from the FBI agents and police detectives who investigated the case; from a paramedic who responded to the scene; and from the director of the Allegheny County Medical Examiner's Office. Photographs were also introduced as evidence, including photos of exhaustively documented bloodstains, bullet fragments, and shell casings, and police body-worn camera footage was also shown to the jury. Bowers's antisemitic social media posts were also introduced as evidence. After 11 days of testimony, prosecutors told the jury in closing argument that Bowers had made "cold, calculated, deliberate choices" in the shooting. Bowers's defense counsel conceded that he had fatally shot all the victims, but argued that there was doubt as to his specific intent: "why he did what he did and what he thought he would accomplish by doing so."

On June 16, 2023, after five hours across two days of jury deliberation, Bowers was found guilty on all 63 federal charges against him, including 11 counts of obstructing the free exercise of religious beliefs resulting in death.

==== Sentencing phase ====
The sentencing phase began on June 16, 2023, with the jury hearing arguments to decide if Bowers should be sentenced to death or life without parole. Bowers' defense lawyers sought to persuade the jury that Bowers had significant brain damage and was influenced by mental illness or delusions. By contrast, prosecutors emphasized evidence showing that Bowers had extensively planned his attack and was motivated by antisemitism, as shown in his numerous rants on social media and statements to police after the attack.

Three University of Pittsburgh Medical Center physicians (two radiologists and a neurologist) testified about their review of brain-imaging tests (an EEG, PET, and MRI) of Bowers in 2021 and 2022. They found the tests to be largely normal. Two defense experts, by contrast, testified that they believed Bowers "had significant brain damage that could be correlated with schizophrenia" and could affect behavior. A separate defense expert, a University of North Texas forensic psychologist, testified on his opinions from 20 hours of examination of Bowers over four days in 2022. He testified that Bowers was "proud" of his attack, showed no remorse for the shooting, and thought that he deserved medals and a parade. The psychologist opined that Bowers is "blatantly psychotic" and has schizophrenia, but agreed on cross-examination that he was "goal-oriented" and planned the attack as much as six months in advance. Separately, a neurologist who examined Bowers in 2021 testified as a defense expert, opining that Bowers had schizophrenia and epilepsy. On cross-examination, the defense neurologist acknowledged that Bowers was not "incapable" of plotting the shootings, but testified that "his reasons for planning it out are unreliable in his brain." The defense presented evidence of Bowers's lengthy history of serious mental illness, including multiple suicide attempts since his teenage years, an incident in which he "threw flammable liquid on his mother and tried to ignite it" at age thirteen, and three instances of involuntary commitment, the latest in 2004.

At the request of the defense, the sentencing phase was split into two parts (each with its own opening statements, closing arguments and jury decision): (1) whether Bowers was eligible to be sentenced to death and (2) the selection of the sentence. On July 13, 2023, after two hours of deliberation, the jury found that Bowers was eligible for a death sentence. After making further deliberation on sentence for two days, the federal jury issued a unanimous decision to sentence Bowers to the death penalty on August 2. Bowers was the first and only criminal to be sentenced to death by the US federal government during the presidency of Joe Biden. On August 3, 2023, Bowers was formally sentenced to death.

==== Imprisonment ====
On August 26, 2023, Bowers was transferred to the custody of the Federal Bureau of Prisons and placed on death row at United States Penitentiary, Terre Haute. Bowers attempted to appeal his sentence for a new trial in November 2023, but his request was denied in May 2024.

In December 2024, when President Joe Biden announced commutations for the death sentences of 37 out of 40 federal death row inmates to life imprisonment without the possibility of parole, he excluded Bowers along with Dzhokhar Tsarnaev, who perpetrated the 2013 Boston Marathon bombing, and Dylann Roof, who committed the 2015 Charleston church shooting, because of their convictions for either terrorism or hate-motivated mass murder related crimes.

The Department of Justice's investigative team was awarded the Attorney General’s David Margolis Award for Exceptional Service in 2024 by Attorney General Merrick B. Garland.

=== State criminal proceedings ===
Bowers was also charged with 36 state criminal counts, including 11 counts of criminal homicide, six counts of aggravated assault, six counts of attempted criminal homicide, and 13 counts of ethnic intimidation. The state charges were held in abeyance pending the federal trial.

== Reactions ==
=== United States ===
==== National ====
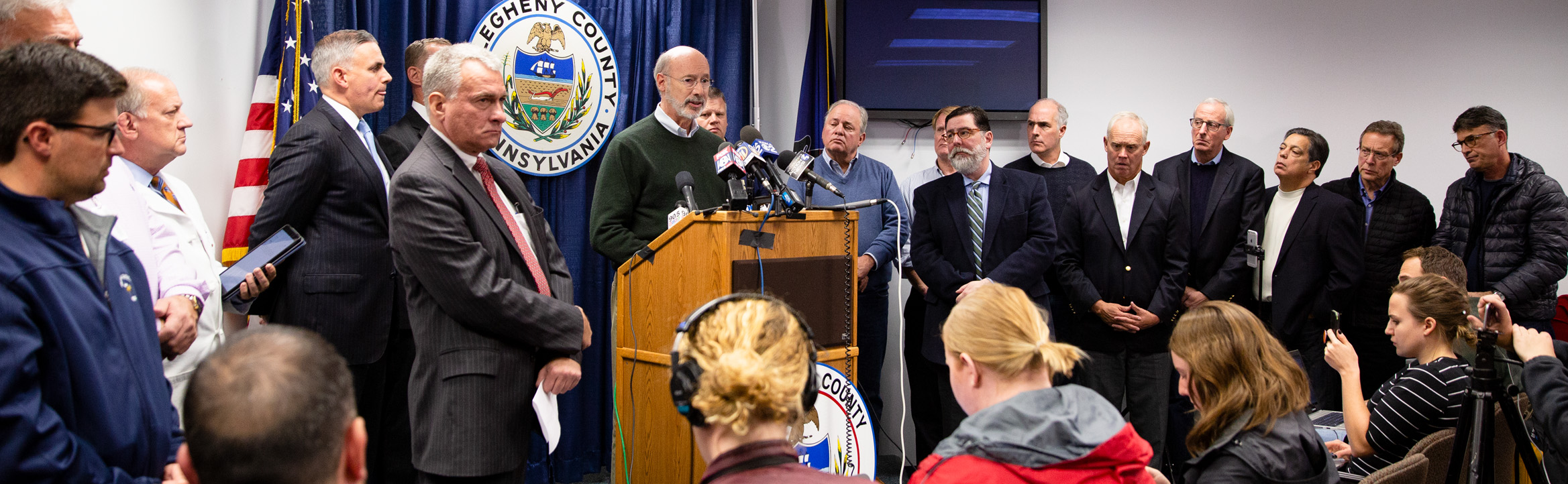
Pennsylvania Governor Tom Wolf makes a statement about the shooting. Pittsburgh Mayor Bill Peduto stands listening in the striped tie.

President Donald Trump, Pennsylvania governor Tom Wolf, then-Braddock mayor John Fetterman, and Pittsburgh city councilman Corey O'Connor released statements about the incident through Twitter. Trump called the shooting a wicked, antisemitic act of "pure evil." He also opined that the shooting was preventable: "If there was an armed guard inside the temple, they would have been able to stop him". Trump suggested cases such as this call for the death penalty.

Cecilia Wang of the American Civil Liberties Union said the attack, along with other recent unrest, was inspired by elements of Trump's rhetoric. Vice President Mike Pence denied any such connection in an NBC News interview that night. Over 2,000 people, including many from the local Jewish community, protested against Trump's visit to the synagogue site, chanting "words have meaning", and carrying signs with such slogans as "We build bridges, not walls".

From October 27 to 31, all U.S. flags on public and military grounds were flown at half-staff in memory of the victims.

On the Friday following the shooting, David Shribman, executive editor of the Pittsburgh Post-Gazette, ran the opening of the Hebrew-Aramaic kaddish, often called the Jewish mourner's prayer, as a full-width front-page headline.

==== Jewish security ====
The aftermath of the shooting included arguably the most ambitious and comprehensive effort ever taken to protect Jewish life in the United States, according to the New York Times. In addition to bringing in $100 million in federal grants through the Nonprofit Security Grant Program (NGSP), the Jewish Federations of North America raised $62 million to secure every Jewish community in North America, overseen by the Secure Community Network. By 2023, 93 Jewish federations had full-time security directors, a more than four-fold increase over the previous five years.

The next year, the Pennsylvania General Assembly passed Act 83 of 2019 to establish the state's Nonprofit Security Grant Fund, a state-level version of the NGSP. Initially, $5 million in grant funding was available. After an increase in antisemitism during the Gaza war in 2023, the General Assembly increased the available funding to $10 million. In the 5 years since its inception, the fund distributed $25 million to synagogues, mosques, and other nonprofit organizations.

==== Local ====
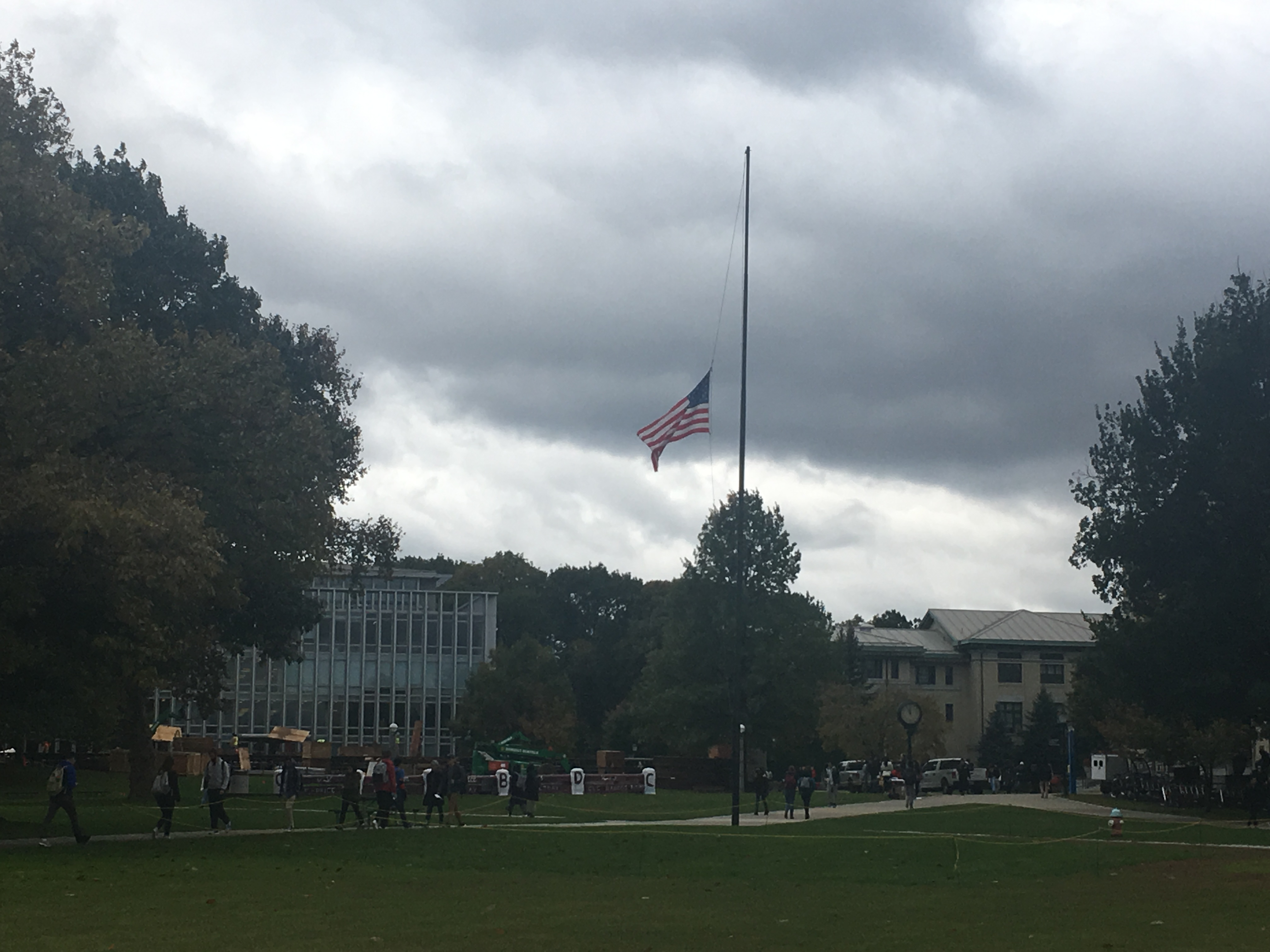
Carnegie Mellon University lowered the American flag to half-staff to mourn the victims.

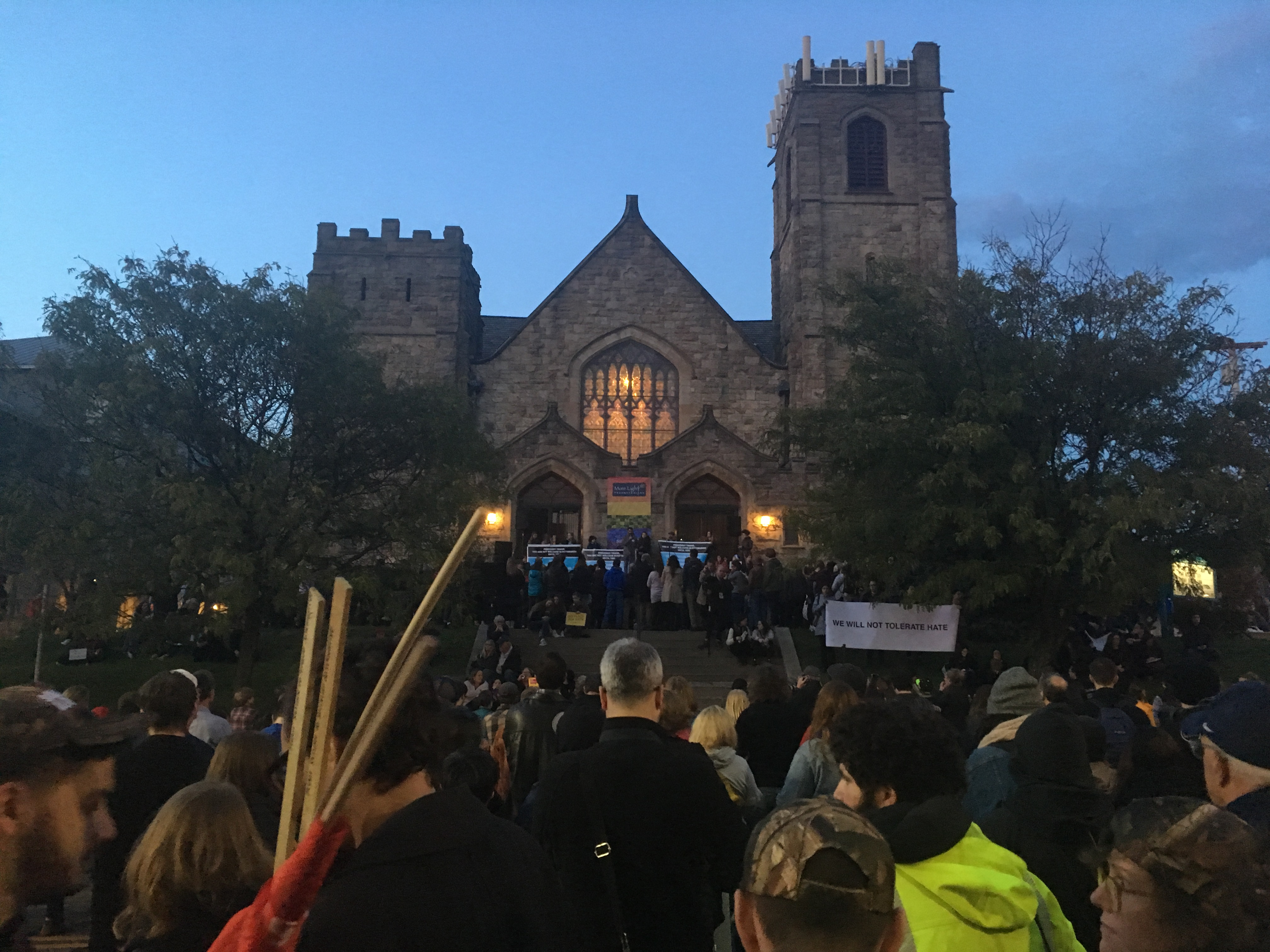
People gathered again at the intersection of Forbes and Murray Avenues in front of the Sixth Presbyterian Church on October 30. On the same day, Trump visited Pittsburgh in response to the shooting incident.

Immediately after the shooting, the campus of Carnegie Mellon University was placed on lockdown and all university-sponsored activities were cancelled for the day. At the same time residents were advised by police to remain in their homes and stay off the streets.

An unusually large proportion of the Pittsburgh Jewish community from all denominations participated in local Jewish rituals related to death and mourning. Jewish tradition requires a person to guard a corpse until it is buried. Shomrim (volunteer guards) took one-hour shifts at the Pittsburgh morgue until the bodies were moved to funeral homes. The Atlantic reported that "most of the volunteers appeared to be Orthodox, but they felt strong solidarity with the liberal communities that were directly affected by the shooting."

Members of the Pittsburgh Steelers attended the joint funeral service for the Rosenthal brothers on Tuesday, October 30, when NFL teams are traditionally off. The brothers, who were intellectually disabled, had a sister who is a former employee of the team.

During the long wait for a trial, members of the Pittsburgh congregations received interfaith support and solidarity from black church and American Sikh communities targeted by violent hatred, including members of the Emanuel African Methodist Episcopal Church in Charleston, South Carolina (targeted by a shooting attack in 2015) and the Sikh temple in Oak Creek, Wisconsin that had been targeted in a shooting attack in 2012.

=== International ===
The Eiffel Tower in Paris darkened its lights in tribute to the victims of the shooting.

Israel's prime minister Benjamin Netanyahu condemned the "horrifying antisemitic brutality", adding "the whole of Israel grieves with the families of the dead." Israel's education and diaspora affairs minister, Naftali Bennett, immediately left for Pittsburgh to visit the synagogue, meet with community members, and participate in the funerals of the victims, and directed the Ministry of Diaspora Affairs "to assess and prepare to assist the Pittsburgh Jewish community, 'including the need for emergency and resilience teams that immediately left Israel for psychological assistance and community rehabilitation.'" Israel's cabinet stood for a moment's silence on October 28 to honor the victims.

Ashkenazi Chief Rabbi of Israel David Lau said "any murder of any Jew in any part of the world for being Jewish is unforgivable". He described the location as "a place with a profound Jewish flavor". Many news reports said he refused to refer to the Conservative congregation as a "synagogue" since it is non-Orthodox. Prominent non-Orthodox Israeli religious leaders and scholars rejected his statement.

Tel Aviv Municipality lit the city hall building with the colors of the American flag in solidarity with the victims of the Pittsburgh attack. An image of the Israeli flag next to the American flag was projected onto Jerusalem's Western Wall.

Pope Francis denounced the "inhuman act of violence" in his Sunday prayers in St. Peter's Square on October 28, and led prayers for the dead and wounded, as well as their families. He asked God "to help us to extinguish the flames of hatred that develop in our societies".

Iranian minister of foreign affairs Javad Zarif offered his thoughts and prayers to the victims of the shooting, and said "Extremism and terrorism know no race or religion, and must be condemned in all cases".

Hamas offered condolences and condemned the attack, noting that they could relate as being "victims of Israeli terror".

Jan Kickert, Austrian permanent representative to the United Nations, said: "The attack ... was an attack on all of us, on what we stand for – religious liberty, human rights. We are committed to the safety and security of Jews wherever they are. I say this with growing up and living with the shame that my forefathers were among the worst perpetrators in Nazi times."

=== Media and organizations ===
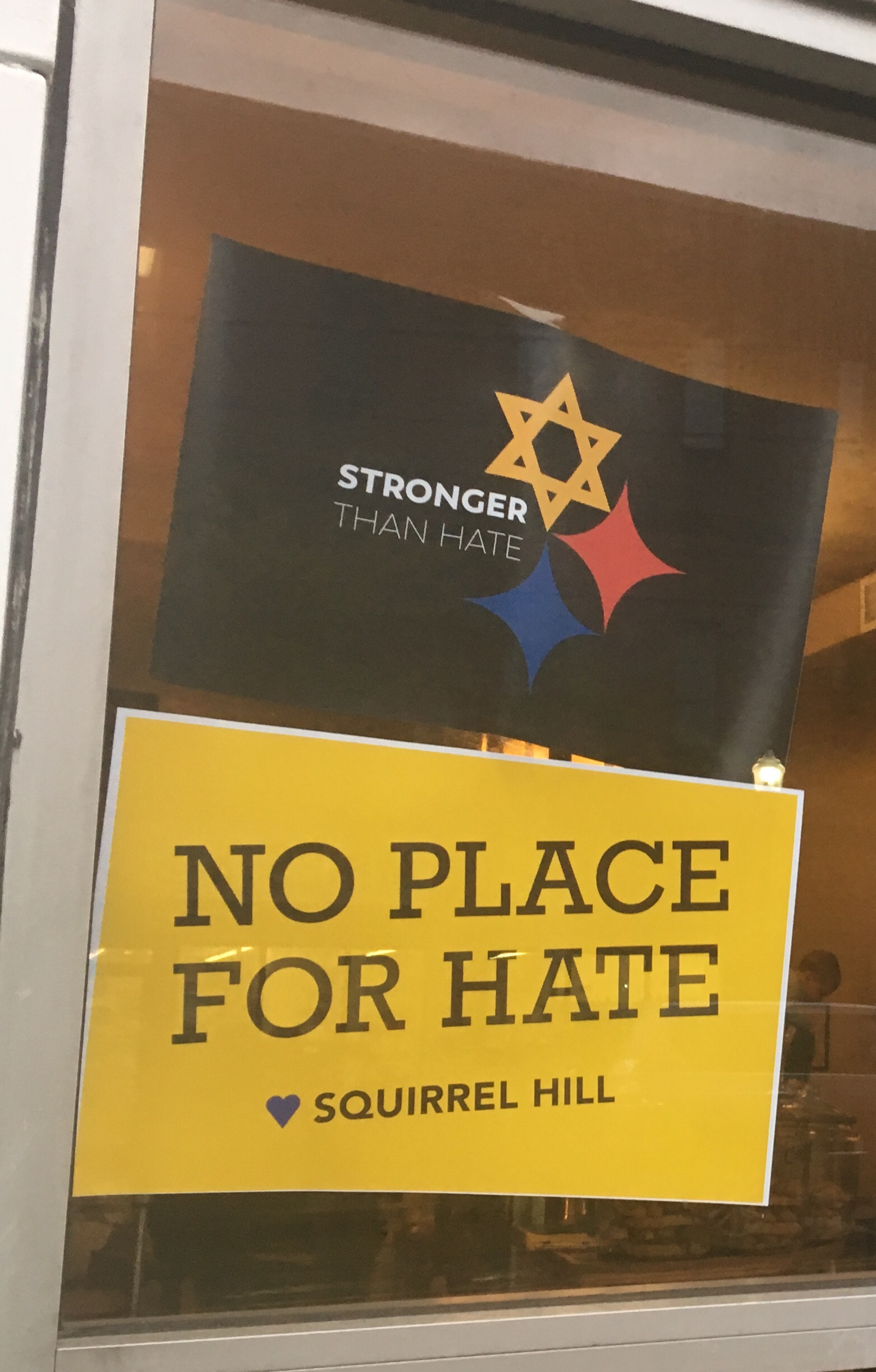
Many local businesses on Murray Avenue put up posters in support of the victims.

The New York Times published an op-ed by Jonathan Greenblatt, CEO of the Anti-Defamation League, that urged readers to fight against antisemitism and hate.

On October 28, the Empire State Building darkened its lights in honor of the victims. According to the building's Twitter account, the top of the spire was left aglow with "an orange halo shining a light on gun violence awareness". In the wake of the shooting, the University of Pittsburgh darkened its traditional Victory Lights atop of the Cathedral of Learning, and on November 2, the university altered the Victory Lights so the blue beam would shine for 11 seconds, one second for each fatality.

=== Sports ===
Sports teams that observed a moment of silence for the shooting victims included the Pittsburgh Steelers at their home game against the Cleveland Browns, the New Orleans Saints at the Minnesota Vikings, the Pittsburgh Penguins at the Vancouver Canucks, the Winnipeg Jets at the Toronto Maple Leafs, the Philadelphia Eagles and the Jacksonville Jaguars playing in London, and the Pittsburgh Panthers hosting Duke at Heinz Field. A moment of silence was also observed before Game 4 of the World Series at Dodger Stadium on the night of October 27.

The Pittsburgh Penguins wore jerseys with a patch that read "Stronger Than Hate" for their game against the New York Islanders on October 30. The team announced that, following the game, the team would auction off the jerseys on behalf of the synagogue. Similarly, the University of Pittsburgh Panthers football team displayed a "Stronger than Hate" decal on their helmets during the November 2 game visiting the University of Virginia.

NFL player Terrell Suggs wore a Star of David on his cleats during a game in October 2019 to commemorate the one-year anniversary of the shooting.

=== Vigils and rallies ===
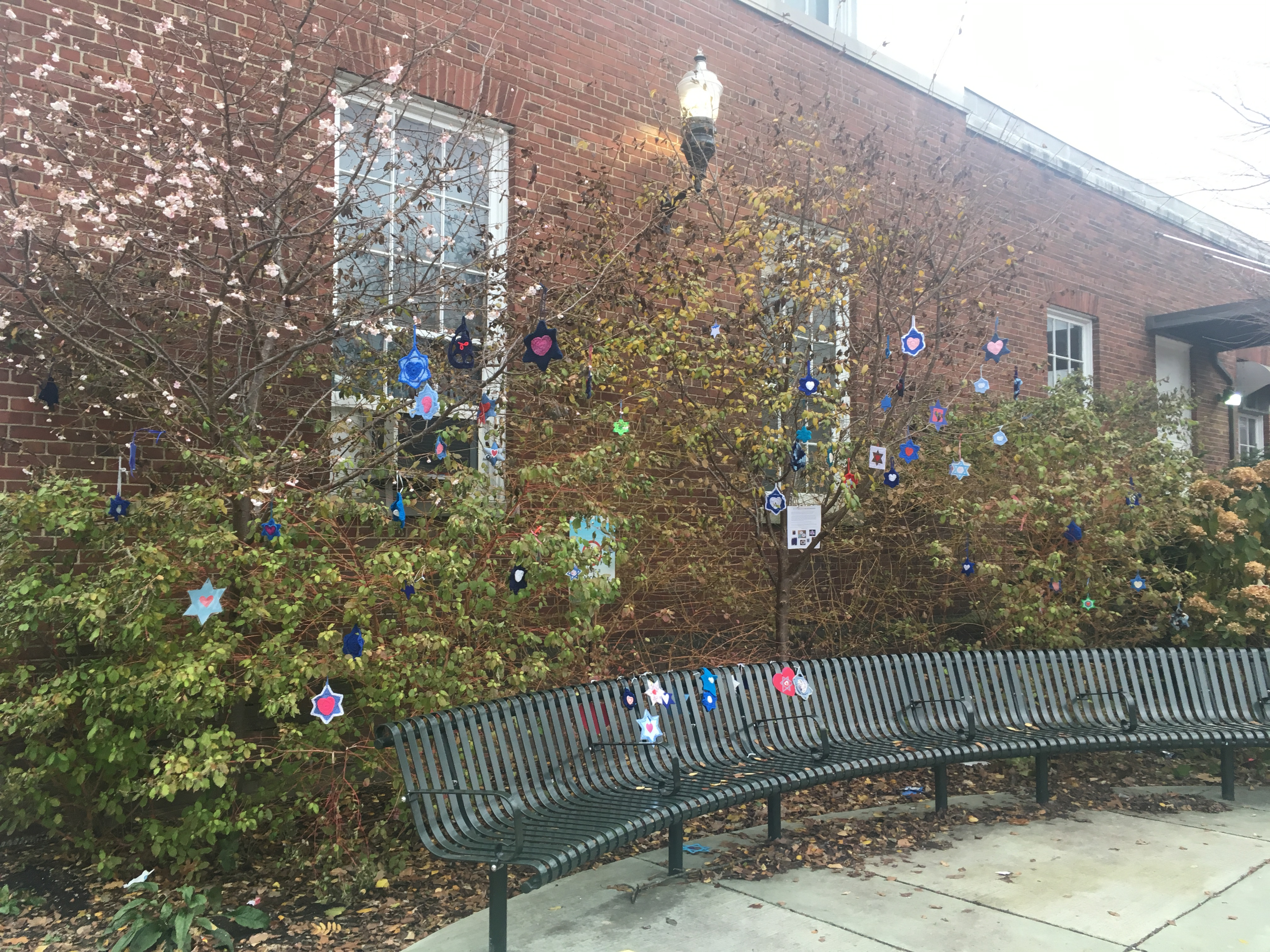
Pittsburgh locals crocheted or knit forms of the Star of David and hung them along Murray Avenue.

On the evening of the shooting, over 3,000 people gathered at the intersection of Murray and Forbes avenues in Squirrel Hill for an interfaith candlelight vigil; it was organized by students from nearby Taylor Allderdice High School. Two additional vigils were held in the neighborhood.

The day after the shooting, an interfaith vigil organized by the regional Jewish Federation was held at Soldiers and Sailors Memorial Hall, drawing an overflow crowd estimated at 2,500. Attended by numerous national and local dignitaries, the event featured several speakers, including the rabbis of the three congregations that occupied the synagogue building, Islamic and Christian clergy, and civic leaders. Among those in attendance were Bill Peduto, mayor of Pittsburgh; Rich Fitzgerald, Allegheny County executive; Senators Bob Casey and Pat Toomey; Governor Tom Wolf; Naftali Bennett, Israeli Minister for Education and Minister for Diaspora Affairs; Ron Dermer, Israeli ambassador to the United States; and Danny Danon, permanent representative of Israel to the United Nations. A video was streamed during the event featuring Israeli president Reuven Rivlin, who offered brief remarks and led the crowd in a recitation of the Kaddish.

In the week following the attack, Jewish and interfaith communal vigils and solidarity rallies were held across the world. In the United States, these were attended by hundreds or thousands of people, in many cities across the nation. (Note: These included Ann Arbor, Atlanta, Austin, Boston, Buffalo, Charleston, Chicago, Cincinnati, Cleveland, Columbus, Denver, Houston, Jacksonville, Knoxville, Los Angeles, Madison, Memphis, Middletown, New Haven, New Orleans, New York City, Philadelphia, Portland, Rochester, Salt Lake City, Seattle, St. Louis, Washington, Wilkes-Barre and Woodbridge.) In Canada, they were held in Montreal, Ottawa, Halifax, Vancouver and other places. In Israel, approximately 500 Americans and Israelis lit candles on the night of October 28 at Zion Square in Jerusalem. In Europe, Jewish communal vigils were held in London, Liverpool, Brighton, and Paris.

College students at more than one hundred campuses across the country held vigils in the days following the shootings in memory of the victims.

The American Jewish Committee and the Jewish Federations of North America called for both Jews and non-Jews to attend synagogue services on the Shabbat following the attack, under the hashtag #ShowUpForShabbat. NBC News reported thousands of people around the world attended services in local synagogues, community centers, and college campuses, including Mayor of London Sadiq Khan. Additionally, many congregations recited the prayer for martyrs Av HaRachamim even though it would normally be omitted that Shabbat. As of 2024, the massacre is still being commemorated.

=== Presidential visit ===
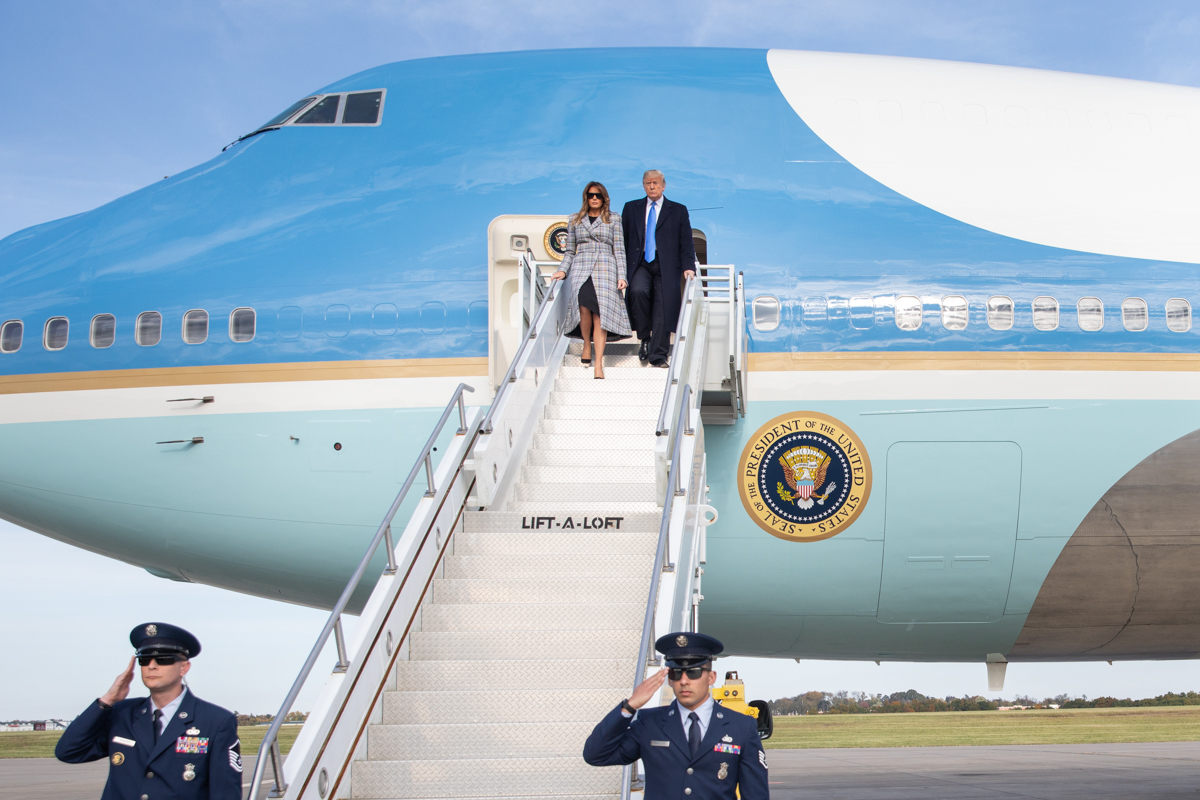
US President Donald Trump and First Lady Melania disembark Air Force One at Pittsburgh International Airport

On October 30, Trump flew to Pittsburgh on Air Force One, accompanied by First Lady Melania Trump, daughter Ivanka Trump, son-in-law Jared Kushner, and Treasury Secretary Steven Mnuchin. They went to the synagogue, where they met with Tree of Life spiritual leader Jeffrey Myers and Israeli ambassador to the US Ron Dermer. Trump lit candles for the victims inside and outside placed stones on each of the 11 Star-of-David markers of the memorial. The group went to UPMC Presbyterian Hospital, where Trump spoke with wounded victims, their families, law enforcement officials, and medical staff.

Trump's visit was discouraged by some in the Pittsburgh community. Pittsburgh mayor Bill Peduto said Trump should not have come, as the wounds were raw and the community was just beginning to mourn and hold funerals. Peduto, with agreement from Allegheny County executive Rich Fitzgerald, also urged Trump to consider "the wills of the families" of the deceased. More than 70,000 people had signed an open letter written by Bend the Arc: Pittsburgh saying that Trump was not welcome until he "fully denounces white nationalism". One of the survivors, Dan Leger, refused to meet Trump in the hospital and later wrote a critical op-ed for the Pittsburgh Post-Gazette. Former Tree of Life president Lynette Lederman opposed Trump's visit, saying she felt his words were "hypocritical" and that "We have people who stand by us who believe in values, not just Jewish values, but believe in values, and those are not the values of this president, and I do not welcome him to Pittsburgh".

Before Trump's visit, Tree of Life rabbi Jeffrey Myers said,

"There is hate, and it isn't going away. It just seems to be getting worse. ... We've got to stop hate, and it can't just be to say we need to stop hate. We need to do, we need to act to tone down rhetoric," adding that he would welcome a visit from Trump.

Aaron Bisno, the rabbi of Rodef Shalom Congregation, said he did not think Trump's presence was beneficial, saying that Trump had become a "symbol of division" for many. During Trump's visit to the synagogue, an estimated 2,000 protesters were cordoned off a few blocks away. Afterward, Rabbi Jeffrey Myers said, "The President was very warm, very consoling."

=== Neo-Nazis and white supremacists ===
Among American neo-Nazis and white supremacists, figures such as Richard B. Spencer, Andrew Anglin, and Matthew Heimbach expressed fear that the backlash over the attack could derail their efforts to gain mainstream political acceptance.

4chan users on the /pol/ board viewed the attack as "accidentally redpilling" people and denied that it had occurred. They claimed the purported attack was a "false flag" committed by Jews to gain sympathy. Some users on Gab praised the shooting and created the hashtag #HeroRobertBowers to express support for the shooter.

On August 10, 2023, Hardy Carroll Lloyd, a man from Follansbee, West Virginia, was arrested for allegedly making threats towards the jurors and witnesses in Bowers's federal trial on social media and in emails and online comments. According to prosecutors with the U.S. Attorney's Office for the Northern District of West Virginia, Lloyd was a "self-proclaimed 'reverend' of a White supremacy movement". He also allegedly expressed support for Bowers and the shooting and had encouraged similar attacks. Lloyd was charged with "obstruction of the due administration of justice, transmitting threats in interstate and foreign commerce and witness tampering." On September 19, 2023, he pleaded guilty and is expected to face more than six years in prison.

=== Fundraising efforts ===
Numerous fundraising efforts were launched in order to assist the survivors of the shooting, pay for the burial of the victims, and pay for the repairs to the synagogue. As of November 1, a GoFundMe campaign which was initiated by an Iranian graduate student in Washington, D.C., had exceeded US$1 million in donations, and a new goal of US$1.2 million has also been surpassed. Muslim groups opened a LaunchGood crowdfunding campaign to help pay for the burial of the victims and survivors' medical bills, with the funds to be distributed by the Islamic Center of Pittsburgh. As of November 1, that campaign had exceeded its goal of $150,000 with more than $225,000 in contributions.

The organizers of the campaign announced that all excess funds would be "spent on projects that help foster Muslim-Jewish collaboration, dialogue, and solidarity". The Jewish Federation of Greater Pittsburgh raised $3.65 million for victims by November 13; donations to that organization were to be matched by the United Way of Southwestern Pennsylvania and the Pittsburgh Foundation. Fundraising campaigns for shooting victims in the Dor Hadash and New Light congregations raised nearly $23,000 combined.

A $6.3 million fund was raised for the survivors of the shooting, the families of the 11 dead, and police officers.

=== Plans for the site ===
The Tree of Life building has been vacant since the shooting. In 2022 an organization called The Tree of Life was founded, with plans to construct a memorial complex on the site. The building where the attack took place was partially demolished in 2024. Designed by Daniel Libeskind, the new structure is to include a museum and a center dedicated to combating hatred and antisemitism, as well as space for the Tree of Life – Or L'Simcha Congregation to worship. The new complex is scheduled to open in 2028.

Plans for the site also include a 300-seat sanctuary/theater that will provide space for both religious and cultural programming and an outdoor memorial. As of May 2026, the nonprofit had raised $50 million toward a $60 million goal.

=== Documentary ===
In 2022, A Tree of Life: The Pittsburgh Synagogue Shooting documentary was released by HBO Documentary Films.

== See also ==
- Poway synagogue shooting, Occurred six months later and inspired by Bowers
- Alt-right#Violent incidents
- Antisemitism in the United States in the 21st century
- Far-right politics#United States
- Geography of antisemitism#United States
- History of the Jews in Pennsylvania
- List of attacks on Jewish institutions in the United States
- List of death row inmates in the United States
- List of synagogue shootings
- Antisemitism in the United States
- Right-wing terrorism
- Christchurch mosque shootings - shooting in a house of worship 2019
- Annunciation Catholic Church shooting - shooting in a house of worship 2025
