= Tree of Life – Or L'Simcha Congregation =

Jewish synagogue in Pittsburgh, Pennsylvania

- Hebrew: עֵץ חַיִּים – אוֹר לְשִׂמְחָה
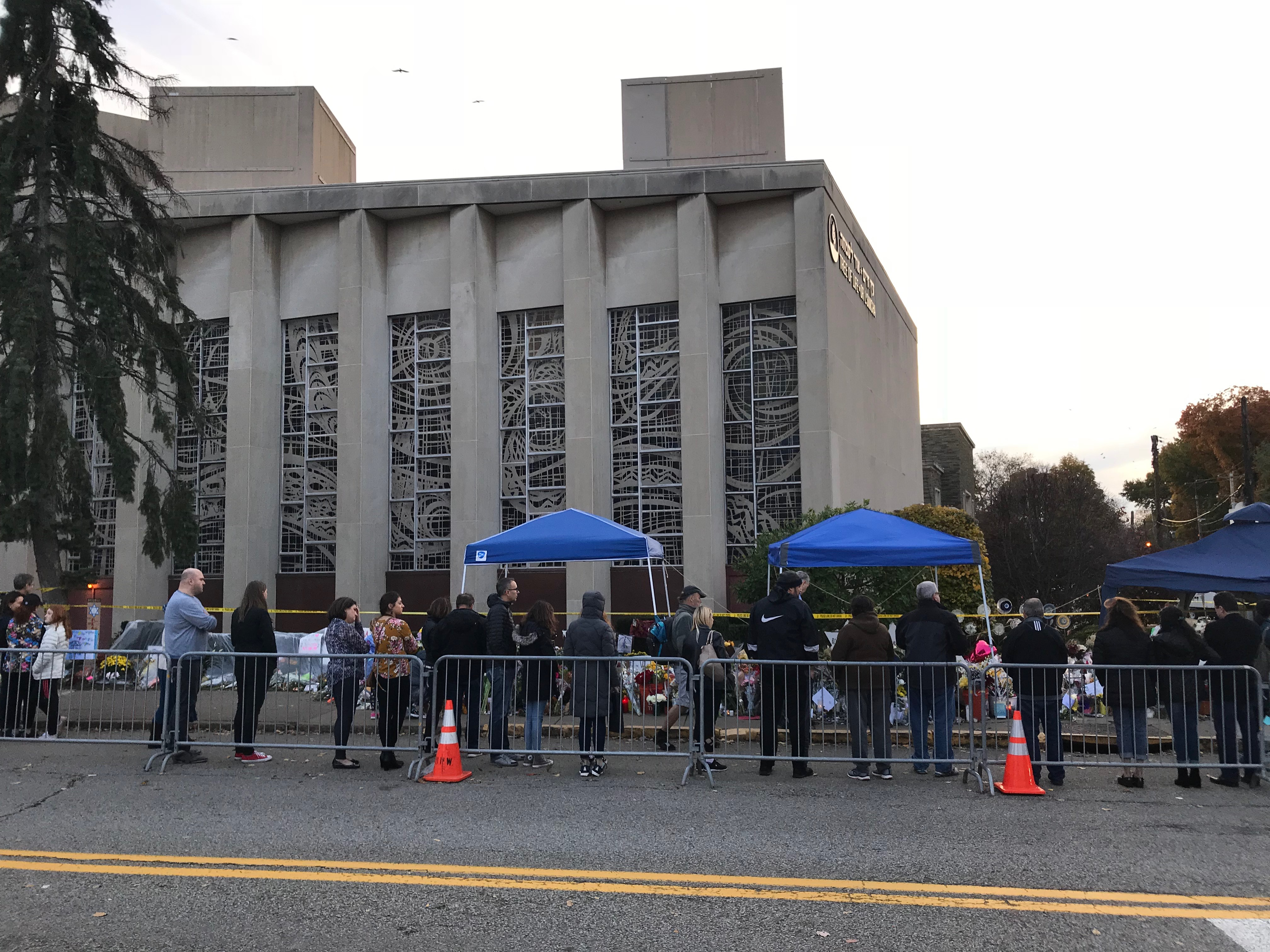
- People outside the synagogue following the 2018 shooting

- Location in Pittsburgh

Religion
- Affiliation: Conservative Judaism
- Ecclesiastical or organizational status: Synagogue
- Leadership: Rabbi Hazzan Jeffrey Myers
- Status: Vacant building (since October 2018); Active congregation

Location
- Location: 5898 Wilkins Avenue, Squirrel Hill, Pittsburgh, Pennsylvania
- Country: United States
- Interactive map of Tree of Life – Or L'Simcha Congregation
- Coordinates: 40°26′37″N 79°55′17″W

Architecture
- Established: 1864 (as a congregation)
- Completed: 1953
- Capacity: 1,250

Website
- www.treeoflifepgh.org

Tree of Life – Or L'Simcha Congregation (Hebrew: עֵץ חַיִּים – אוֹר לְשִׂמְחָה) is a Conservative Jewish synagogue in the Squirrel Hill neighborhood of Pittsburgh, Pennsylvania, in the United States. The congregation moved into its present synagogue building in 1953. It merged with Congregation Or L'Simcha in 2010, bringing its membership to 530 families.

Originally founded as an Orthodox congregation in 1864, Tree of Life Congregation gradually moved closer to Conservative Judaism. In 1886, it affiliated with the Jewish Theological Seminary Association (JTS), at the time an Orthodox institution, but which developed the Conservative ideology in the early 1900s. Tree of Life joined with JTS offshoot United Synagogue of America about 1916, formally connecting to the nascent Conservative movement.

In 2018, the synagogue was the target of a mass shooting in which eleven people were murdered and seven injured. It was the deadliest attack on the Jewish community in the United States. The synagogue building remains vacant since 2018, while the congregation continues to worship.

== History ==
Tree of Life Congregation was formed in Pittsburgh, Pennsylvania, in 1864 as a breakaway group from Rodef Shalom, an Orthodox synagogue founded in 1854 which began adopting Reform practices following the visit of Rabbi Isaac Mayer Wise to the city. The initial group of 16 members met in the home of Gustavus Grafner. Then called by its Hebrew name, Etz Chayyim (Hebrew: עץ חיים, transl. 'Tree of Life'), the congregation was chartered in 1865 and acquired land in Sharpsburg for use as a cemetery. The congregation met in temporary locations in the downtown area over the coming years, until in 1883 it bought a former Lutheran church property downtown. At that point, it became known by its English name, Tree of Life.

In its early years, Tree of Life was the city's center for Orthodox Judaism, and attracted Orthodox Jewish immigrants from Eastern Europe. In 1883, it shortened the traditional Orthodox prayer service, and in 1886 became affiliated with the Jewish Theological Seminary Association, a rabbinical training institute which was at the time an Orthodox institution but which developed the Conservative ideology in the early 1900s. Around 1916, Tree of Life joined the national Conservative Jewish network, the United Synagogue of America.

In 1906, the congregation began constructing a permanent home on Craft Avenue in the Oakland neighborhood of Pittsburgh. The synagogue opened in 1907 with sanctuary seating for 750. (Note: Designed by architect Daniel A. Crone, the structure was later sold to the Pittsburgh Playhouse, which continued to use it as a performance venue until 2019, when the building was demolished.) English-language prayers were introduced the same year.

Beginning in the 1920s, Tree of Life shifted further toward left-wing Conservative Judaism under the direction of Rabbi Herman Hailperin, who led the congregation for 45 years. Among the practices Hailperin instituted were organ music during the prayer services, the elimination of the rabbinically mandated second day of festival observance, the election of women to the temple's board of trustees, the calling of women to the Torah reading, and counting women as part of the minyan.

In 1953, Tree of Life moved into its present building in the Squirrel Hill neighborhood of Pittsburgh. The land for the new structure was gifted by then-synagogue president Charles J. Rosenbloom. The synagogue symbolically showed its ties to Israel with a cornerstone hewn from limestone quarried in Jerusalem. The structure initially opened with a library, kitchen, an arts and crafts store, a stage, and vestry rooms. In 1959 the congregation broke ground on a 1,400-seat sanctuary fronted by "rows of swirling, modernistic stained-glass windows illustrating the story of creation, the acceptance of God's law, the 'life cycle' and 'how human-beings should care for the earth and one another". In 1995, membership numbered 850 families.

=== Tenants and merger ===
In the 2000s, an aging membership and the migration of the Jewish community to suburban neighborhoods led to decreasing synagogue membership. Tree of Life began renting space in its building to other congregations. In 2008, Congregation Or L'Simcha (Hebrew: אור לשמחה, transl. 'Light of Joy'), founded by Rabbi Chuck Diamond in 2005, began holding services in the Tree of Life building. In 2010, the two congregations voted to merge and became known as Tree of Life – Or L'Simcha Congregation. The merger added 120 congregants to Tree of Life's membership rolls, bringing the combined membership to 530 families.

In April 2010, Dor Hadash, a Reconstructionist congregation, began renting space in the Tree of Life building. New Light, a Conservative congregation, left its home of 60 years in 2017 and carried its Torah scrolls in a procession to Tree of Life, where it also began renting space.

=== Mass shooting ===
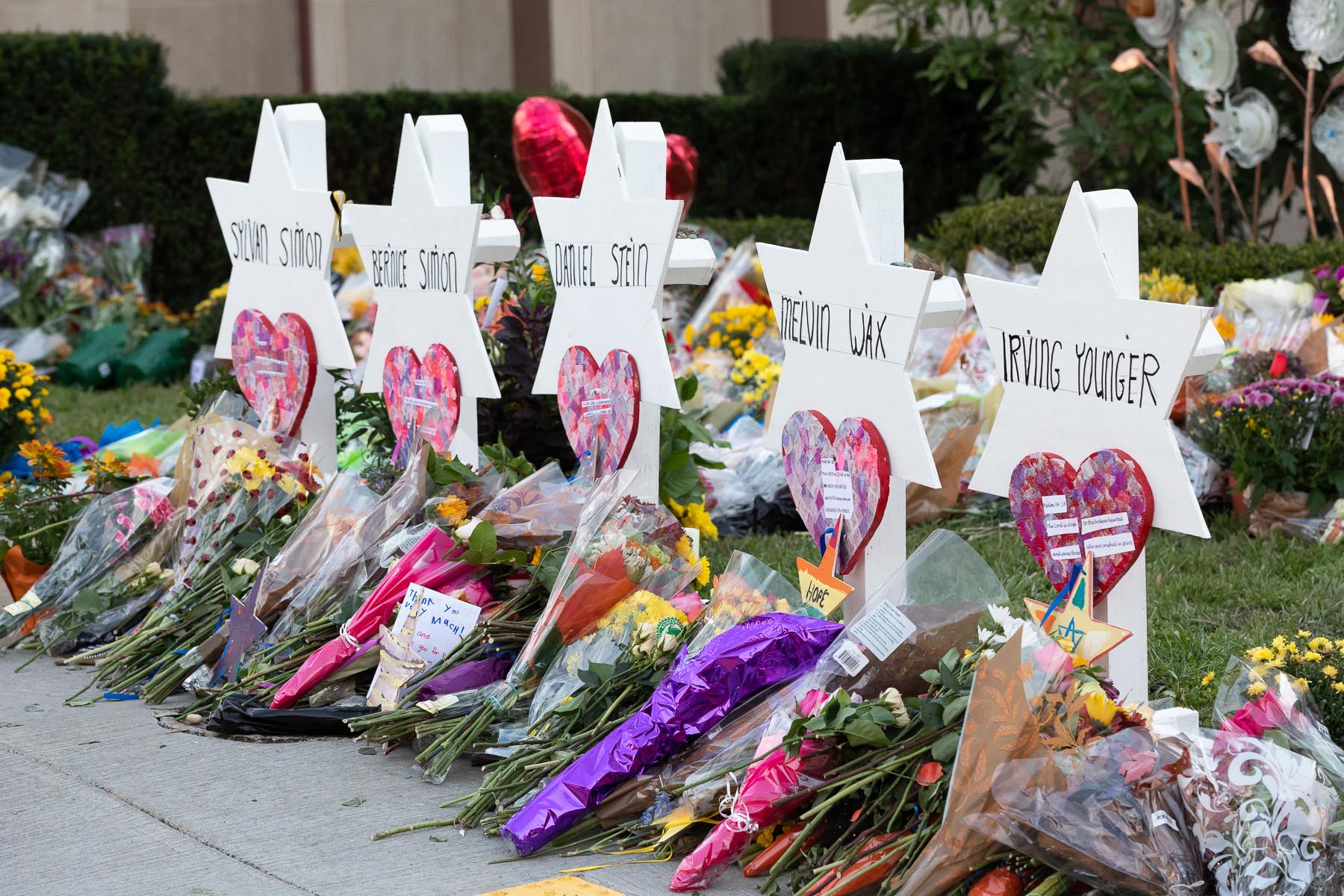
Memorials for victims outside the synagogue

A mass shooting occurred in the Tree of Life synagogue during Shabbat morning services on October 27, 2018. A gunman entered the building shouting antisemitic statements and opened fire, killing eleven and injuring six, including four responding police officers. The shooter, Robert Bowers, was apprehended at the scene.

=== Reopening ===
The synagogue has been permanently closed since the shooting. In May 2021, synagogue officials announced that architect Daniel Libeskind had been selected as the lead architect for reconstruction. The main sanctuary of the campus and the stained glass windows of the temple was preserved.

On January 17, 2024, 80% the synagogue was demolished to transform the site of shooting into a new complex along with key parts of the sanctuary walls preserved, to create a center for worship, education, and healing as well as a museum, and a memorial. The Tree of Life hopes to have the new building open in time for the High Holiday season in 2027, with a grand opening to follow in the following year.

== Leadership ==
The congregation elected its first spiritual leader, Rabbi Michael Fried, a graduate of the Jewish Theological Seminary, in 1898. The longest-tenured rabbi of the congregation was Rabbi Herman Hailperin, who acceded to the position in 1922 while in his early twenties, the same year he was ordained by the Jewish Theological Seminary; he actively served for the next 45 years, being named rabbi emeritus in 1968. Following is the rabbinical leadership of the Tree of Life Congregation:

- Rabbi Michael Fried (1898–1906)
- Rabbi Rudolph Coffee (1906–1915)
- Rabbi Morris Mazure (1915–1922)
- Rabbi Emeritus Herman Hailperin (1922–1968)
- Rabbi Solomon Kaplan (1968–1982)
- Rabbi Emeritus Alvin K. Berkun (1983–2006)
- Rabbi Stephen Listfield (2006–2009)
- Rabbi Chuck Diamond (2010–2017)
- Rabbi Hazzan Jeffrey Myers (2017–2026)

The synagogue's lay leadership established a tradition of volunteering and support for Jewish social service activities. Alexander Fink, the synagogue president from 1873 to 1892, was also a founder of the city's Hebrew Benevolent Society and later served as president of the United Hebrew Relief Association. When the synagogue established its new home in Squirrel Hill, facilities were given over for meetings of junior and senior Hadassah, the Women's League for Traditional Judaism, Young Judaea clubs, and Boy Scouts and Girl Scouts troops.

== Notable members ==
- Howard Fineman (1948–2024), journalist who is global editorial director of the AOL Huffington Post Media Group
- Steve Irwin (born 1959), attorney and former Pennsylvania Banking Commissioner
- Joel Rubin (born 1971), politician and media commentator on domestic political and Middle East affairs
- Judah Samet (1938–2022), businessman, speaker, and Holocaust survivor
- Bari Weiss (born 1984), opinion writer and editor

== See also ==
- History of the Jews in Pittsburgh

== Sources ==
- Gurock, Jeffrey S. (1996). American Jewish History: The history of Judaism in America: Resisters and Accommodators. Vol. 5. KTAV.
- Heineman, Kenneth J. (2010). Catholic New Deal: Religion and Reform in Depression Pittsburgh. Penn State Press. ISBN 9780271043456.
- Nadell, Pamela S.; Raphael, Marc Lee (1988). Conservative Judaism in America: A Biographical Dictionary and Sourcebook. ABC-CLIO. ISBN 9780313242052.
- Olitzky, Kerry M.; Raphael, Marc Lee (1996). The American Synagogue: A Historical Dictionary and Sourcebook. Greenwood Publishing Group. ISBN 9780313288562.
- Squirrel Hill Historical Society (2005). Squirrel Hill. Arcadia Publishing. ISBN 9780738537177.
