= LaunchGood =

Crowdfunding

Launch Good, Inc.
- Website type: Crowdfunding
- Headquarters: Detroit, Michigan, U.S.
- Founders: Chris Blauvelt; Amany Killawi; Omar Hamid
- Website: launchgood.com
- Launched: 8 October 2013

LaunchGood is a crowdfunding platform focused on the Muslim community worldwide. LaunchGood went live in October 2013 and it raised more than $688 million from 2.1 million donors across 155 countries.

LaunchGood is a crowdfunding platform used to gather money from the public, which circumvents traditional avenues of investment. Project creators choose a deadline and a minimum funding goal, and usually provide rewards or "perks" for contributors at various levels.

The founders of LaunchGood are Chris Blauvelt, Amany Killawi and Omar Hamid.

== Projects ==
LaunchGood has been used to fundraise for several nationally recognized projects, including a campaign to help rebuild African-American churches destroyed by arson in the summer of 2015, and a campaign to fund the legal team of Adnan Syed (widely known from the podcast Serial) through a special appeal of his conviction. Each of these campaigns raised more than $100,000 through the platform. An October 2018 campaign to help pay for Jewish burials for the 11 victims of the Pittsburgh synagogue shooting, and the medical bills of survivors, raised its goal of $25,000 in six hours and went on to raise more than $200,000.

== Awards ==
LaunchGood has received the Islamic Economy Award, Small & Medium Enterprises (SME).

== See also ==
- Civic crowdfunding
- Comparison of crowd funding services
- Global Giving
