= List of Carnegie Mellon University people =

This is a list of notable people associated with Carnegie Mellon University in the United States.

== Notable students and alumni ==
Several names of Carnegie Mellon University Alumni Award recipients.Carnegie Mellon alumni (the select alumni list is arranged alphabetically).

Selected Carnegie Mellon alumni
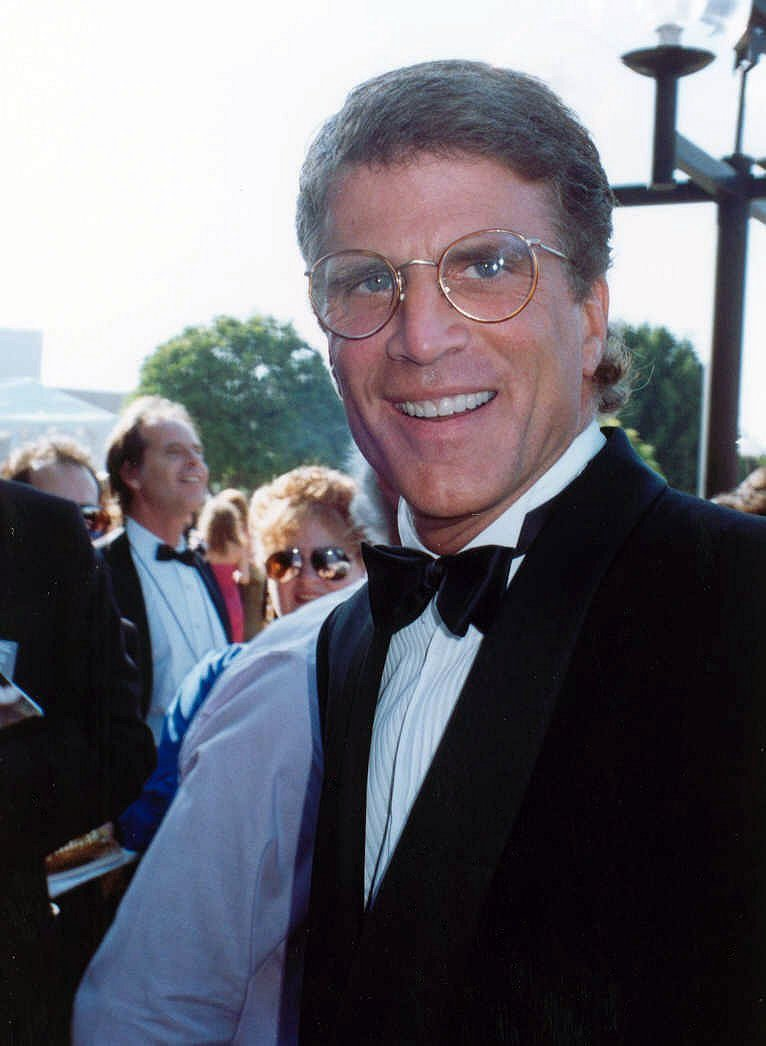
Ted Danson
Emmy Award-winning actor

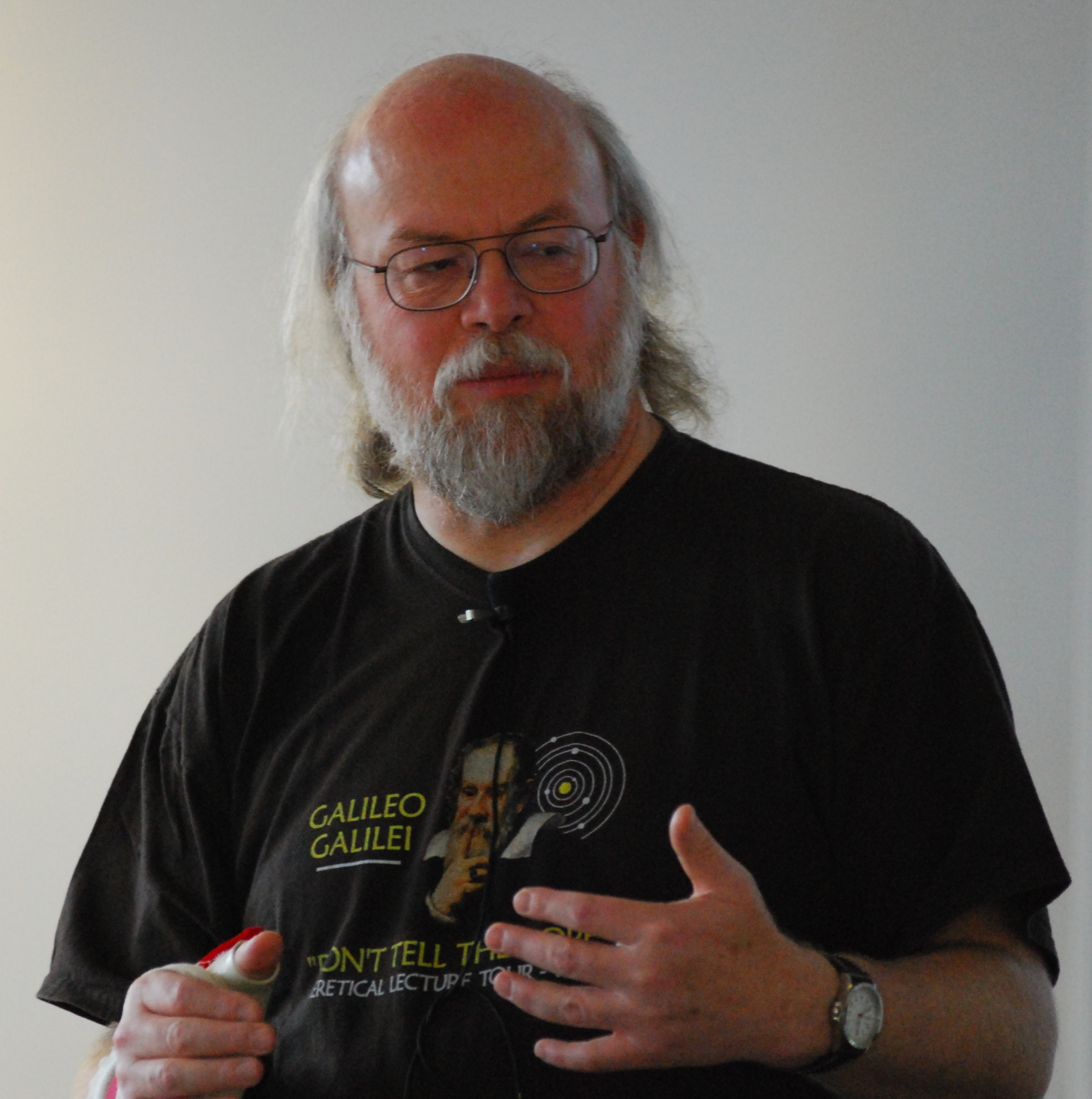
James Gosling
creator of Java

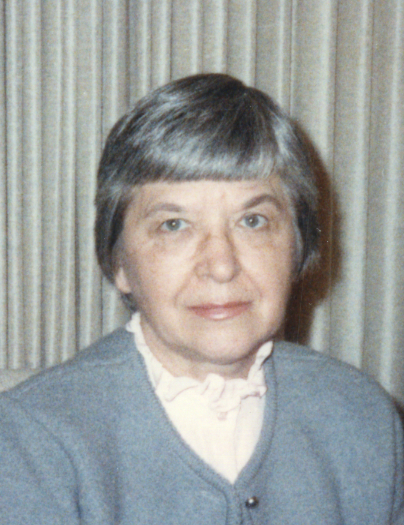
Stephanie Kwolek
inventor of Kevlar fiber

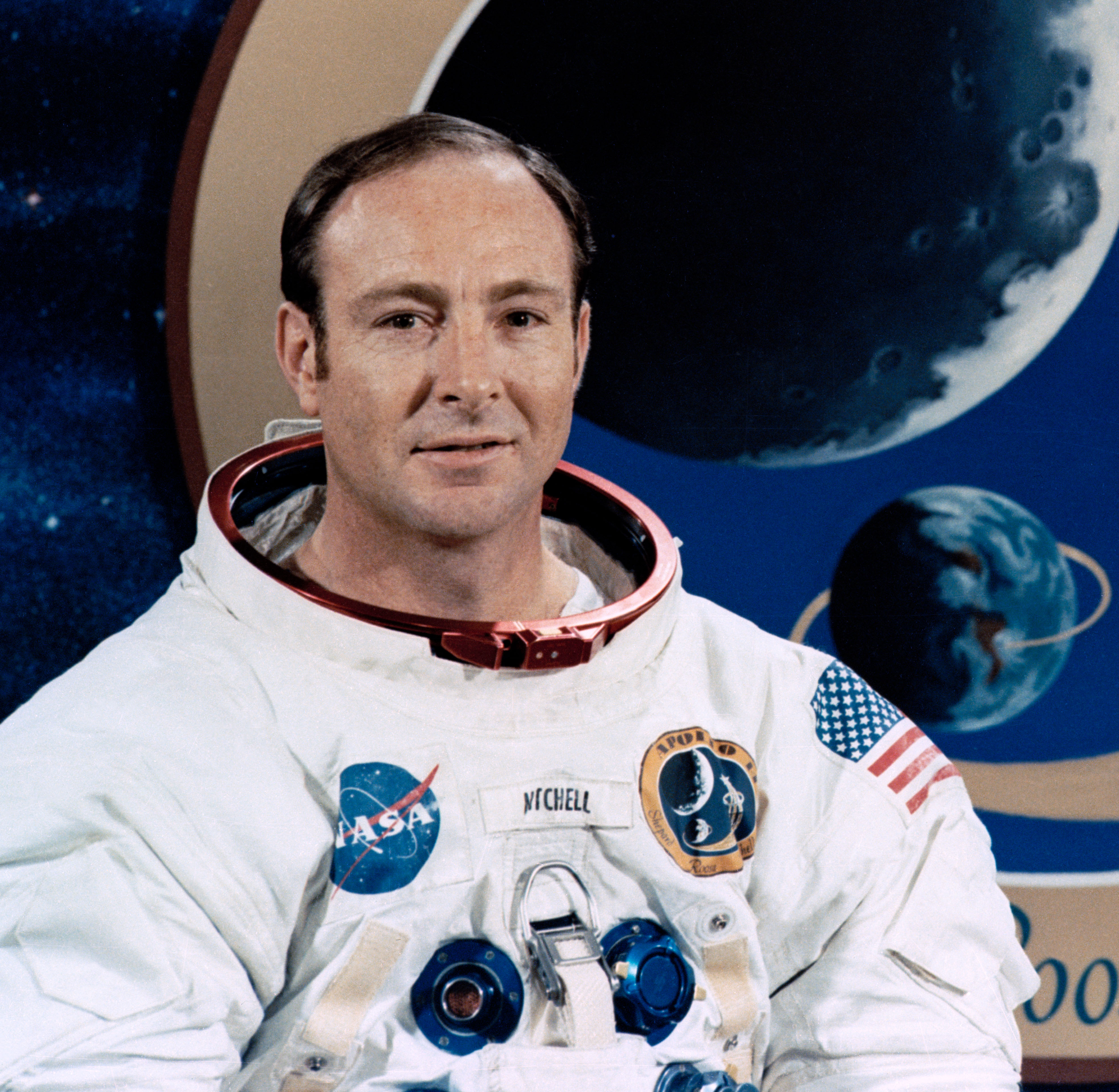

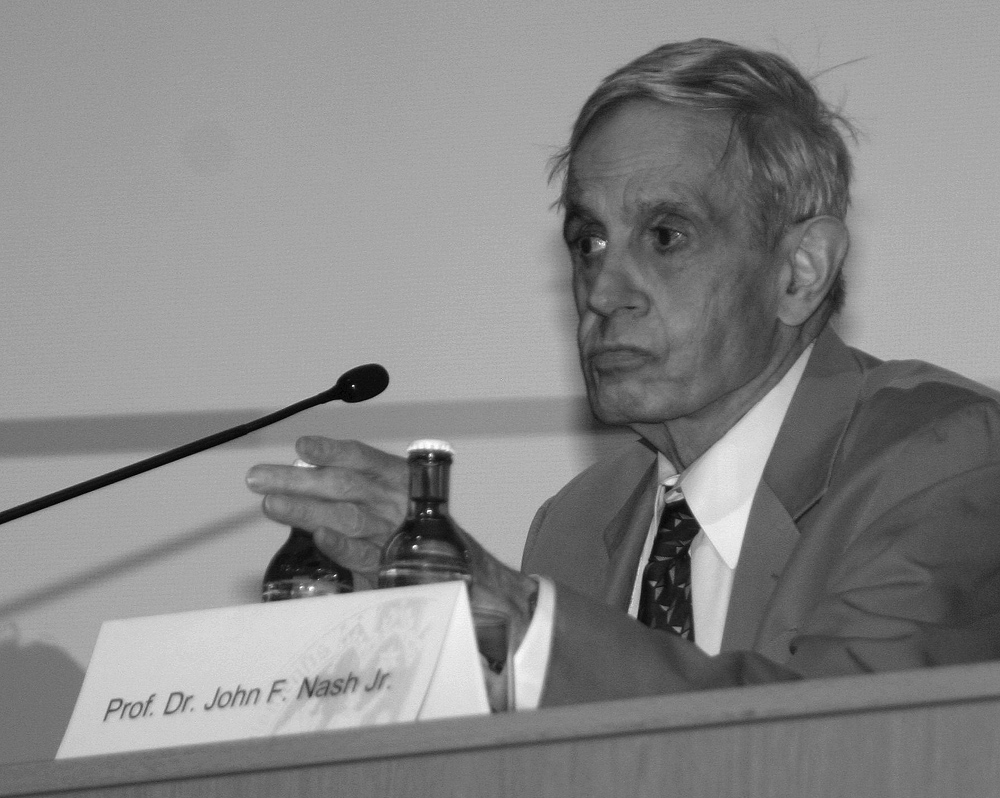
John Forbes Nash Jr.
Nobel laureate

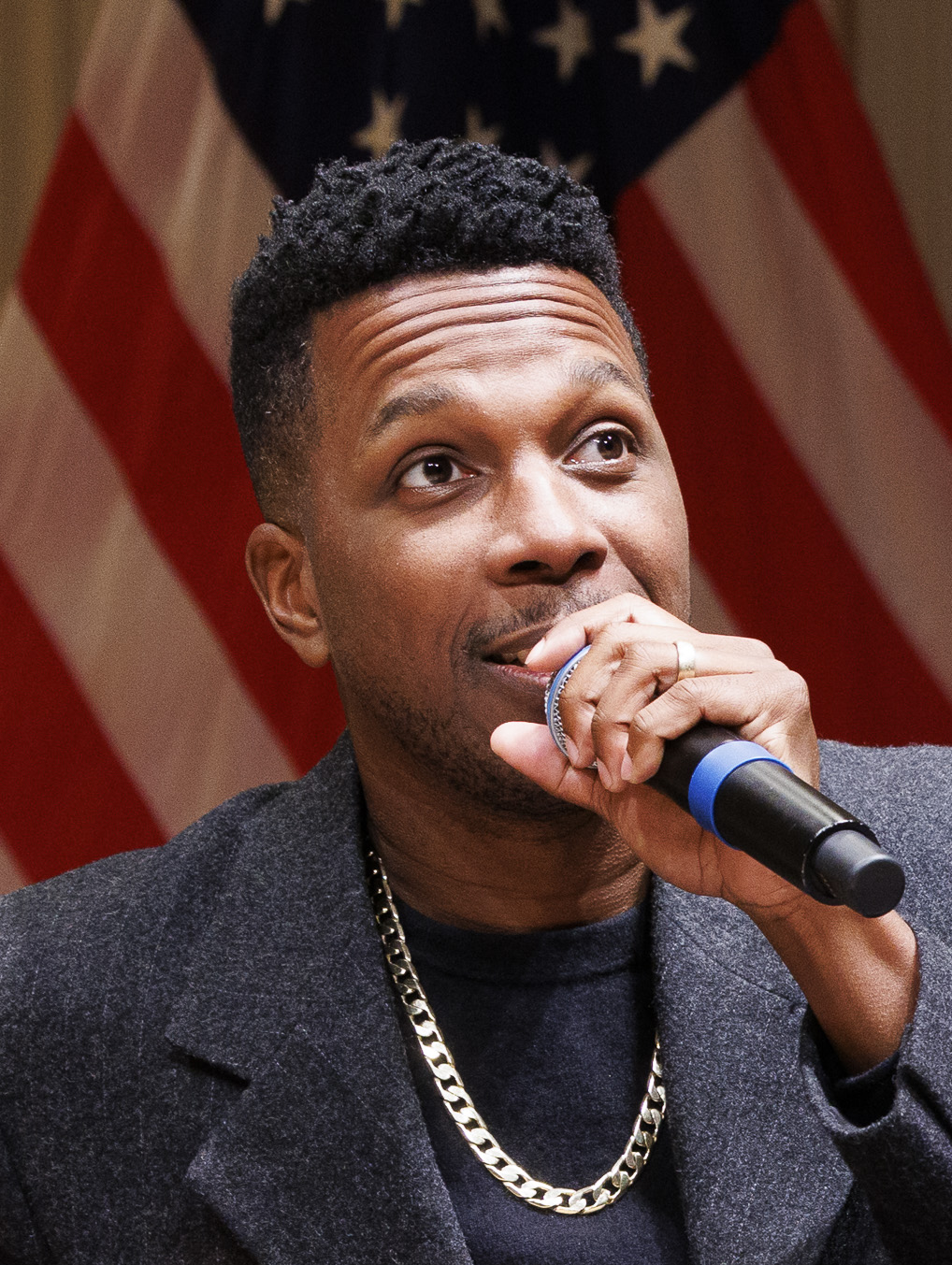
Leslie Odom Jr.
Tony Award-winning actor

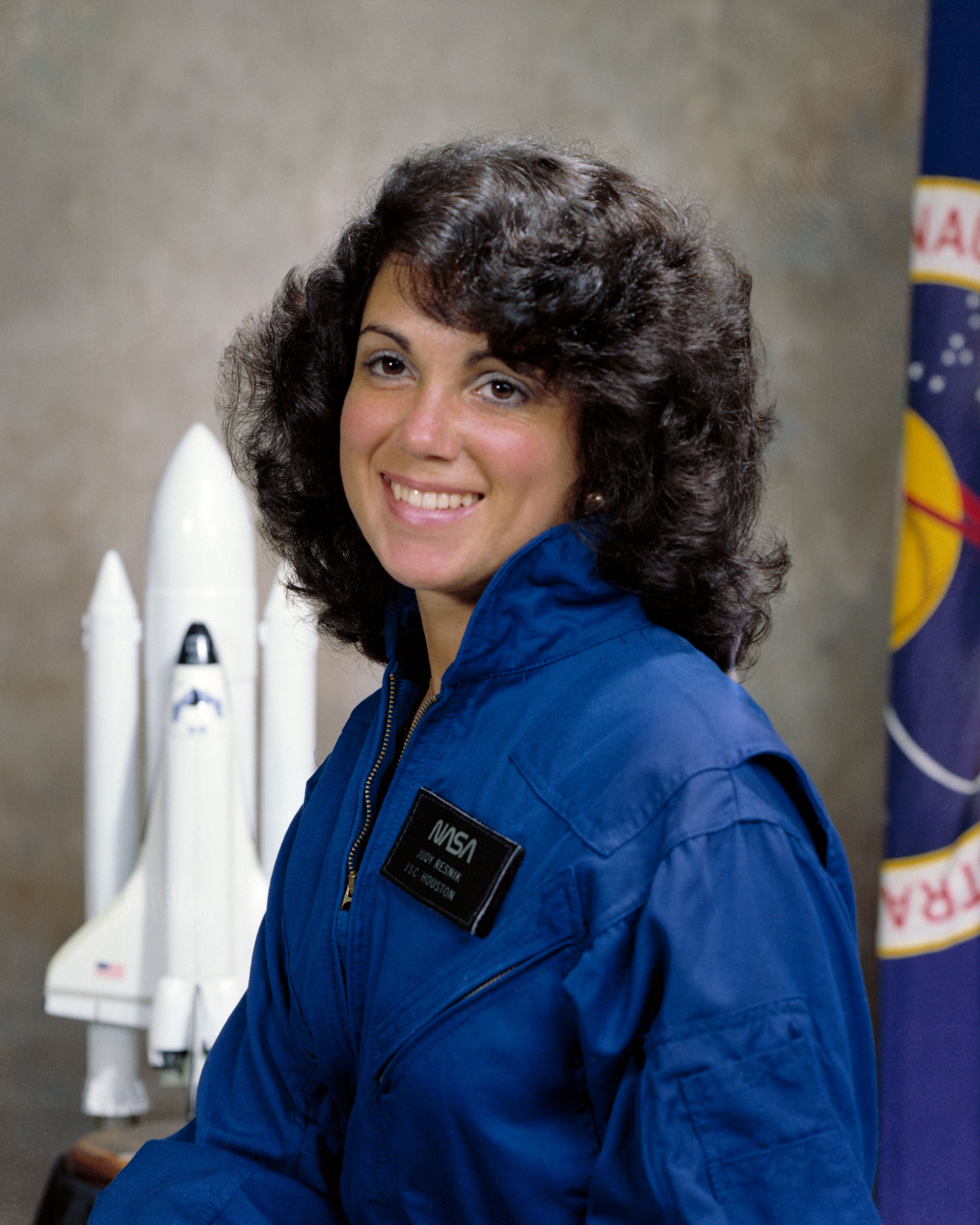
Judith Resnik
NASA astronaut

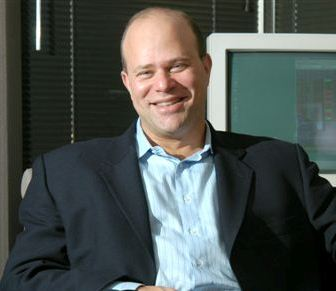
David Tepper
billionaire, founder of Appaloosa Management

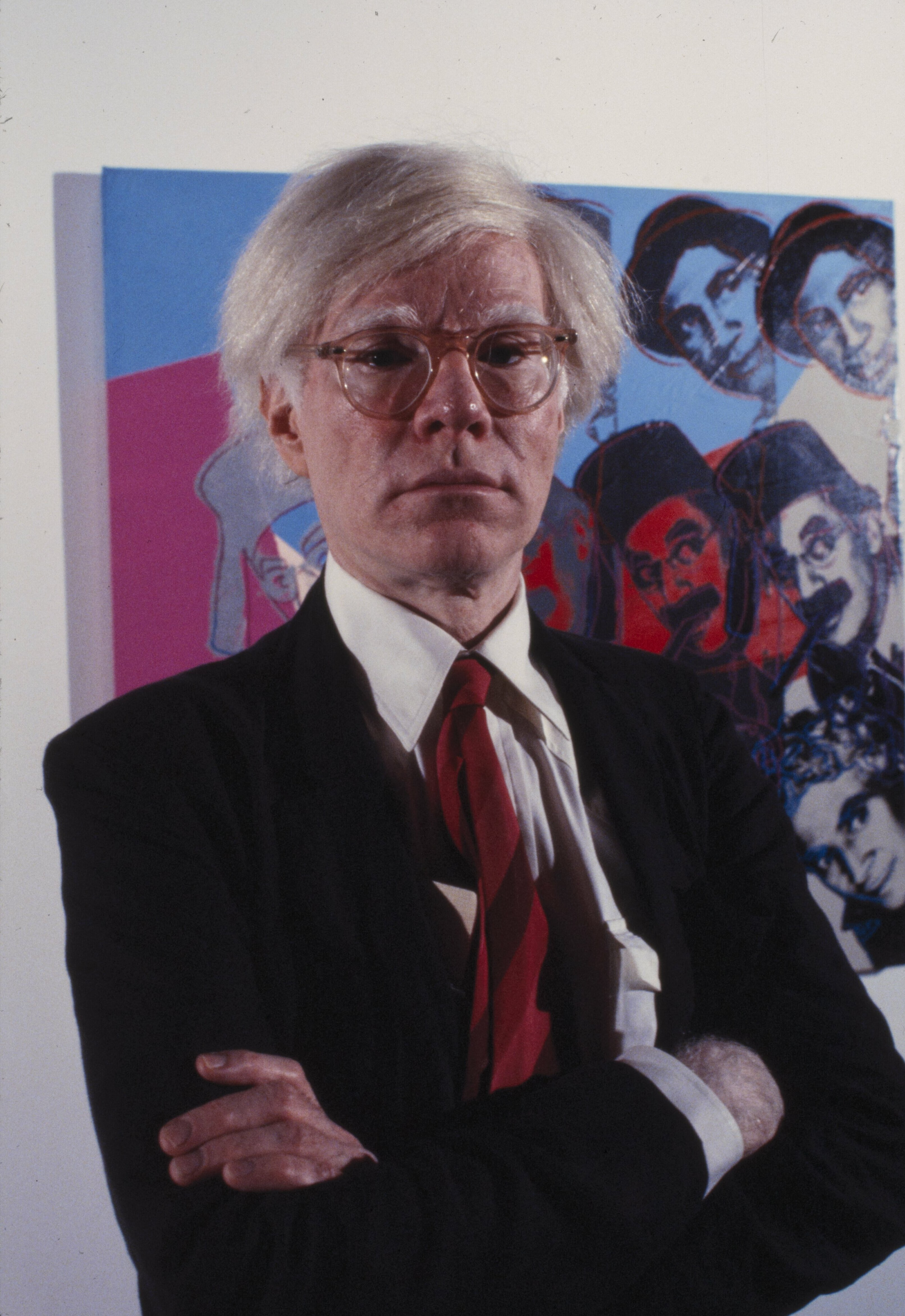
Andy Warhol
artist

=== Nobel laureates ===
- John L. Hall (B.S. 1956, M.S. 1958, Ph.D. 1961), 2005 Nobel Prize in Physics
- Finn E. Kydland (Ph.D. 1973, faculty member), 2004 Bank of Sweden Prize in Economic Sciences
- Dale Thomas Mortensen (Ph.D. 1967), 2010 Bank of Sweden Prize in Economic Sciences
- John Forbes Nash (B.S. 1948, M.S. 1948), 1994 Bank of Sweden Prize in Economic Sciences, the subject of A Beautiful Mind
- Edward C. Prescott (Ph.D. 1967, faculty member 1971–1980), 2004 Bank of Sweden Prize in Economic Sciences
- Clifford Shull (B.S. 1937), 1994 Nobel Prize in Physics
- Oliver E. Williamson (Ph.D. 1963), 2009 Bank of Sweden Prize in Economic Sciences

=== Turing Award recipients ===
- Edward Feigenbaum (B.S. 1956, Ph.D 1960), artificial intelligence, 1994
- Shafi Goldwasser (B.S. 1979), cryptography, 2012
- Allen Newell (Ph.D 1957, faculty member 1961–1992), artificial intelligence, 1975
- Alan Perlis (B.S. 1943, faculty member 1956–1971), compiler construction, 1966; first Turing Award winner
- Ivan Sutherland (B.S. 1959), computer graphics, 1988

=== Wolf Prize recipients ===
- Raoul Bott (Ph.D. 1949), Wolf Prize in Mathematics, 2000

=== Enrico Fermi Award winners ===
- George Cowan (Ph.D. 1950), nuclear scientist who was involved in the Manhattan Project, the U.S. atomic initiative during World War II; founder of the Santa Fe Institute

=== Stockholm Prize in Criminology winners ===
- Daniel Nagin (B.S, M.S. 1971, Ph.D. 1976, professor), criminologist, 2014

=== National Medal of Science recipients ===
- Raoul Bott (Ph.D. 1949), Mathematical, Statistical, and Computer Sciences, 1987
- Allen Newell (Ph.D. 1957, professor), Mathematical, Statistical, and Computer Sciences, 1992
- George Pake (B.S., M.S. 1945), Physical Sciences, 1987
- Frederick Rossini (B.S. 1925, M.S. 1926, DSc (hon.) 1948), Chemistry

=== National Medal of Technology and Innovation recipients ===
- Robert Dennard (Ph.D. 1958), dynamic random access memory (DRAM), 1988
- Stephanie Kwolek (B.S. 1946), inventor of Kevlar, 1996
- Mary Shaw (Ph.D. 1972), software architecture pioneer, 2012
- Frank L. Stulen (1943), numerical control of machine tools, 1985

=== MacArthur Fellows ===
- Stefan Savage (B.S. 1991), professor at UC San Diego, 2017
- Dawn Song (M.S. 1999), Carnegie Mellon professor of computer science (2002–2007), current professor at UC Berkeley, 2010
- Luis von Ahn (Ph.D. 2005), Carnegie Mellon professor of computer science, 2006

=== Academia ===
==== Educators ====
- Padmanabhan Balaram (Ph.D. 1973), director of Indian Institute of Science, India
- Arthur T. Benjamin (B.S. 1983), mathematician and mathemagician specializing in combinatorics
- John P. Crecine (B.S. 1961, M.S. 1963, Ph.D. 1966), former dean of the Dietrich College of Humanities and Social Sciences at Carnegie Mellon and Ppresident of Georgia Institute of Technology (1987–1994)
- James W. Dean Jr., PhD, president of the University of New Hampshire
- Michael D. C. Drout (B.A. 1990), professor at Wheaton College and scholar specializing in Anglo-Saxon and medieval literature, science fiction and fantasy, especially the works of J. R. R. Tolkien and Ursula K. Le Guin
- Marvin L. Goldberger (B.S. 1943), former president of the California Institute of Technology (1978–1987), former director of Institute for Advanced Study (1987–1991), former dean of the natural science at University of California, San Diego (1994–1999)
- John Graham (Ph.D. 1983), former dean of the Frederick S. Pardee RAND Graduate School and current dean of the Indiana University School of Public and Environmental Affairs
- Leslie John (M.Sc., Ph.D. 2011), author, cehavioral scientist, professor at Harvard Business School
- Pradeep K. Khosla (M.S. 1984, Ph.D. 1986), 8th chancellor of the University of California, San Diego
- Robert Kibbee (died 1982), chancellor of the City University of New York
- Robert Lepper, art professor who developed the country's first industrial design degree program
- Rob Linsenmeier, professor emeritus of Biomedical Engineering and Professor Emeritus of Neurobiology, Northwestern University
- Michael C. McFarland (M.S. 1979, Ph.D. 1981), president of College of the Holy Cross, former dean of the College of Arts and Sciences at Gonzaga University (1996–2000)
- Joseph S. B. Mitchell (B.S. 1981, M.S. 1981), professor, Applied Mathematics and Computer Science at Stony Brook University
- William F. Pounds (B.S. 1950, M.S. 1959, Ph.D. 1964), dean of MIT Sloan School of Management (1966–1980)
- Suh Nam Pyo (Ph.D. 1964), president of KAIST, South Korea
- Madhav V. Rajan (Ph.D. 1990), former associate professor at the Wharton School of the University of Pennsylvania, full professor at the Stanford Graduate School of Business, and dean of the Booth School of Business at the University of Chicago
- Mendu Rammohan Rao (M.S. 1968, Ph.D. 1969), dean emeritus of Indian School of Business, India
- Larry Eugene Rivers (Ph.D. 1977), former president of Fort Valley State University
- Suresh P. Sethi (Ph.D. 1972), Eugene McDermott Professor at the Naveen Jindal School of Management at The University of Texas at Dallas, former General Motors professor at the University of Toronto, Alumni Achievement Award from Tepper School, fellow of Royal Society of Canada, AAAS, INFORMS, IEEE
- Jon Strauss (Ph.D. 1964), dean of Engineering, Whitacre College of Engineering, Texas Tech University, former president of Bainbridge Graduate Institute (2008–2009), Harvey Mudd College (1997–2006) and Worcester Polytechnic Institute (1985–1994)
- Richard L. Van Horn (Ph.D. 1976), former president of the University of Houston and the University of Oklahoma
- Hugh D. Young (Ph.D. 1959), longtime professor who taught physics for over 50 years at Carnegie Mellon; co-author of the later editions of the highly regarded textbook University Physics, now in its 15th edition; received many of Carnegie Mellon's highest awards

==== Members of National Academy of Sciences ====
- Raoul Bott (Ph.D. 1949), Mathematics, 1964
- Stephen Fienberg (B.S. 1979), Applied mathematical sciences, 1999
- Marvin L. Goldberger (B.S. 1943), Physics, 1963
- Shafrira Goldwasser (B.S. 1979), Computer and Information Sciences, 2004
- John L. Hall (B.S. 1956, M.S. 1958, Ph.D. 1961), Physics, 1984
- Leonard Lerman (B.S. 1945), Genetics, 1986
- Philip Morrison (B.S. 1936), Physics, 1971
- Frederick Mosteller (B.S. 1938, M.S. 1939), Mathematics, 1974
- Allen Newell (Ph.D 1957, professor), Computer and Information Sciences, 1972
- Frederick Rossini (B.S. 1925, M.S. 1926, DSc (hon.) 1948), Chemistry, 1951
- Clifford Shull (B.S. 1937), Physics, 1975
- Ivan Sutherland (B.S. 1959), Computer and Information Sciences, 1978
- Oliver Williamson (Ph.D. 1963), Economic Sciences, 1994

==== Members of National Academy of Engineering ====
- Andy Bechtolsheim (M.S. 1976), Electronics Engineering, 2000
- Stuart Card (M.S. 1970, Ph.D. 1978), Computer Science & Engineering, 2007
- Bernard Cohen (Ph.D. 1950), Electric Power/Energy Systems Engineering, 2003
- Bob Colwell (Ph.D.), Computer Science & Engineering, 2006
- Robert Dennard (Ph.D. 1958), Electronics Engineering, 1984
- Charles Geschke (Ph.D. 1973), Computer Science & Engineering, 1995
- Shafrira Goldwasser (B.S. 1979), Computer Science & Engineering, 2005
- James Gosling (Ph.D. 1983), Computer Science & Engineering, 2004
- Anita K. Jones (Ph.D. 1973), Computer Science & Engineering, 1994
- Angel Jordan (M.S. 1959, Ph.D. 1959, Professor), Electronics Engineering, 1986
- Pradeep K. Khosla (Dowd University Professor), Electrical and Computer Engineering, and Robotics, 2006
- H. T. Kung (Ph.D. 1973), Computer Science & Engineering, 1993
- Stephanie Kwolek (B.S. 1946), Chemical Engineering, 2001
- James D. Meindl (B.S. 1955, M.S. 1956, Ph.D. 1958), Electronics Engineering, 1978
- Shree K. Nayar (Ph.D. 1991), Computer Science and Engineering, 2008
- John Ousterhout (Ph.D. 1980), Computer Science & Engineering, 2001
- Alan Perlis (B.S. 1943, professor), Computer Science & Engineering, 1977
- Jonathan Rothberg (B.S. 1985), Bioengineering, 2004
- Stefan Savage (B.S. 1991), Computer Science & Engineering, 2023
- Manuela M. Veloso (Ph.D. 1992, Professor), Computer Science & Engineering, 2022
- William L. Whittaker (M.S. 1975, Ph.D. 1979, Professor), Computer Science & Engineering, 2009
- Mao Yisheng (Ph.D. 1919), Civil Engineering, Materials Engineering, 1982

==== Other prominent faculty ====
- Bob Altemeyer (PhD 1965), associate professor of Psychology at the University of Manitoba
- Costas Azariadis (MBA 1971, Ph.D. 1975), Edward Mallinckrodt Distinguished University Professor in Arts & Sciences at Washington University in St. Louis
- William A. Barnett (M.A. 1970, Ph.D. 1974), Oswald Distinguished Professor of Macroeconomics at the University of Kansas
- Timothy Devinney (B.S., 1977), chair and professor of International Business University of Manchester, Fellow of Academy of Management, fellow of Academy of International Business
- Ravi Jagannathan (M.S. 1981, Ph.D. 1983), Chicago Mercantile Exchange/John F. Sandner Professor of Finance at Kellogg School of Management, Northwestern University, former director of American Finance Association (2002–2005)
- Kevin Lane Keller (MSIA 1980), E.B. Osborn Professor of Marketing at Tuck School of Business, Dartmouth College
- John E. Laird (Ph.D. 1983), John L. Tishman Professor of Engineering at University of Michigan, co-creator of Soar cognitive architecture
- Rose Hum Lee (B.S. 1942), first woman and the first Chinese American to head a US university sociology department, at Roosevelt University
- Charles E. Leiserson (Ph.D. 1981), professor of Computer Science at Massachusetts Institute of Technology, co-author of the Introduction to Algorithms
- Ronald D. Macfarlane (M.S. 1957, Ph.D. 1959), Distinguished Professor of Chemistry at Texas A&M University
- Nolan McCarty (M.S. 1992, Ph.D. 1993), Susan Dod Brown Professor of Politics and Public Affairs at Princeton University
- Greg Morrisett (M.S. 1991, Ph.D. 1995), Allen B. Cutting Professor of Computer Science and associate dean for Computer Science and Engineering, Harvard University
- Michael S. Scott Morton (B.S. 1961), Jay W. Forrester Professor of Management (emeritus) at MIT Sloan School of Management
- Jan Mossin (Ph.D.), made significant contribution to capital asset pricing model
- John Muth (Ph.D., professor 1956–1964), father of the rational expectations revolution in economics
- Jay Nunamaker (B.S. 1964), Regents Professor of Management Information Systems, Computer Science, and Communication at University of Arizona
- Jeffrey Pfeffer (B.S. 1968, MSIA 1968), Thomas D. Dee II Professor of Organizational Behavior at the Stanford Graduate School of Business
- Demetri Psaltis (B.S. 1974, M.S. 1975, Ph.D. 1977), Thomas G. Myers Professor of Electrical Engineering at California Institute of Technology
- Norman Sadeh (PhD 1991), professor, founding CEO and chairman, Wombat Security Technologies; chief scientist, e-Commerce & e-Work Program, EU Commission
- Millicent Sullivan (Ph.D. 2003), Alvin B. & Julie O. Stiles Professor Of Chemical & Biomolecular Engineering at the University of Delaware
- Jerry D. Thompson (Doctor of Arts in history), Regents Professor of History, Texas A&M International University, Laredo, Texas; specialist on American Southwest
- Sheridan Titman (M.S. 1978, Ph.D. 1981), Walter W. McAllister Centennial Professor of Finance at McCombs School of Business, University of Texas at Austin, Ppresident of Western Finance Association
- Andrew B. Whinston (M.S. 1960, Ph.D. 1962), Hugh Roy Cullen Centennial Professor in Business Administration at McCombs School of Business, University of Texas at Austin

=== Architecture and design ===
- Nader Ardalan, architect of the Iran Center for Management Studies
- Roger Duffy, architect
- Dan Friedman, graphic designer
- Tasso Katselas, architect
- David M. Kelley (B.S. 1973), co-founder of IDEO
- Christian Schwartz, type designer
- Steven Song, architect and theoretician
- Cheng Tzu-tsai (M.Arch.), architect and political dissident; designed the 228 Massacre Monument in 228 Peace Memorial Park

=== Art ===
- Mel Bochner (1962), pioneer of postminimal arts and conceptual art
- Jonathan Borofsky (1964), 20th-century conceptual artist and sculptor
- Mia Brownell (1993), painter
- Sheila Butler (1960), visual artist
- Virgil Cantini (1946), artist and professor at the University of Pittsburgh
- Elizabeth Carpenter (1976), author, clothing designer, creator of educational children's puzzles
- John Currin (1984), contemporary figure and portrait painter
- Ken Ferguson (1952), ceramist
- Katie Grinnan (1992), multi-disciplinary artist and educator
- Raymond Kaskey (1967), sculptor
- Deborah Kass, painter
- Matt Keegan (1998), visual artist
- Joyce Kozloff (1942), artist and founder of Pattern and Decoration movement
- Katharine Kuharic (1984), figurative painter and educator
- Dane Mitchell (1997), visual artist
- Burton Morris (1986), pop artist
- Shalom Neuman (1970), painter and sculptor
- Philip Pearlstein (1949), figure painter
- Rob Rogers (1984), editorial cartoonist
- Abigail Satinsky (2003), art curator
- Jacqueline Thurston (1961), artist, writer and educator
- Andy Warhol (1949), painter and major figure in the pop art movement

=== Business ===
- Paul Allaire (M.B.A 1966), former Xerox director (1986–1990), CEO (1990–2000), and chairman (1991–2000)
- Lenny Beer (B.A. 1971), media executive, producer and artist manager; co-founder and editor-in-chief of HITS Magazine and co-founder of MGMT Company
- Lane Bess (B.S. 1983), executive and venture capitalist; former CEO of Palo Alto Networks; former COO of Zscaler; founder of Bess Ventures and Advisory
- Peter Fitzhugh Brown (Ph.D.), hedge fund executive; CEO of Renaissance Technologies
- Ted Decker (M.B.A. 1993), CEO and president of The Home Depot
- Francisco D'Souza (Master of Science in Industrial Administration 1992), CEO of Cognizant Technology Solutions
- Dina Dublon (Master of Science in industrial administration 1979), former EVP and CFO of JP Morgan Chase; board member of Microsoft, Accenture, PepsiCo, and Carnegie Mellon University
- Marc Ewing (B.S. 1992), co-founder of Red Hat Inc., maker of Red Hat Enterprise Linux
- Yoshiaki Fujimori (Master of Science in industrial administration 1981), president and CEO of Lixil Group
- Scott Griffith (1981), chairman and CEO of Zipcar
- Cormac Kinney (B.S. 1993, Master of Science in industrial administration 1994), software inventor and entrepreneur
- Alexander Knaster (B.S. 1980), billionaire private equity investor; founder and chairman of Pamplona Capital Management
- Jim Levy (B.S. 1965, Master of Science in industrial administration 1966), founding CEO of Activision (1979–1986)
- Gerald C. Meyers (B.S., M.S.), former chairman of American Motors
- Sulajja Firodia Motwani, Indian woman entrepreneur
- Andrew Ng (B.S. 1997), co-founder of education technology company Coursera, director of Stanford University's Artificial Intelligence Lab
- Ted Nierenberg (B.S. 1944), founder of Dansk International Designs
- Brian Olsavsky (M.B.A), CFO of Amazon
- Ratul Puri, chairman of Hindustan Powerprojects Private Limited
- John Swearingen, petroleum industry executive
- David Tepper (Master of Science in industrial administration 1982), founder and chairman of Appaloosa Management, owner of the NFL's Carolina Panthers, and the MLS's Charlotte FC
- Madhavi Vuppalapati, CEO and chairperson of Prithvi Information Solutions
- Romesh Wadhwani (M.S., Ph.D.), billionaire private equity investor; founder and chairman of Symphony Technology Group
- Sunil Wadhwani, co-founder of Mastech Digital and IGATE
- Charles Erwin Wilson (1909), CEO of General Motors (1946–1953), president of General Motors (1941–1953) (See also: Government and politics section)

=== Government, law, public policy, and military ===
- Gust Avrakotos (attended for two years), directorate of Operations, Central Intelligence Agency
- Nilofar Bakhtiar (M.S.), senator and federal minister for Tourism in Pakistan
- Jonathan Berry, 5th Viscount Camrose (MBA), British hereditary peer; former Parliamentary Under-Secretary of State for Artificial Intelligence and Intellectual Property; member of the House of Lords
- Edmund Cheng (M.Arch. 1980), Chairman of Civil Aviation Authority of Singapore; former Chairman Singapore Tourism Board and National Arts Council
- Malia Cohen (M.A.), 34th California state controller
- Peter Corroon (B.S.), mayor of Salt Lake County, Utah
- Carmen Yulín Cruz (MS in Public Policy and Management, 1986), member of the 28th House of Representatives of Puerto Rico (2009–2013); mayor of San Juan, Puerto Rico (2013–2020)
- Jody J. Daniels (B.S. 1983), U.S. Army Lieutenant general; first woman to serve as Chief of the Army Reserve and Commanding General, Army Reserve Command
- Peter J. De Muth (BS 1914), U.S. congressman from Pennsylvania
- Charles L. Evans (M.S., Ph.D. in Economics), president and CEO of the Federal Reserve Bank of Chicago, 2007–2023
- Rich Fitzgerald (BSME 1981), president, Allegheny County Council, Pennsylvania (2001–present)
- Gina M. Grosso (B.S. 1986), U.S. Air Force Lieutenant general; first woman to serve as Deputy Chief of Staff for Manpower, Personnel and Services; later Assistant Secretary of Veterans Affairs for Human Resources / Operations, Security and Preparedness
- Karl F. Hausauer (BA, 1917), Adjutant General of New York
- Anita K. Jones (Ph.D. 1973), director of Defense Research and Engineering of the U.S. Department of Defense
- Sydney Kamlager-Dove (MA, 1994), United States representative for California's 37th district
- Salim Saifullah Khan (BS Mechanical Engineering, 1968), senator and federal minister for Petroleum & Natural Resources, Commerce, Housing & Works, Inter-Provincial Coordination in Pakistan
- Vasili Kuznetsov, Soviet political figure
- Susie Lee (BS, 1989; MS, 1990), United States representative for Nevada's 3rd District
- Nara Lokesh, former member of Legislative Council (2017–2023), Government of Andhra Pradesh, Republic of India
- Keith B. McCutcheon (B.S. 1937), U.S. Marine Corps general and assistant commandant of the Marine Corps (1970)
- Oopali Operajita (MAPW 1995), senior Parliamentary adviser, India
- Joseph D. Patch, U.S. Army major general
- Bill Peduto (attended), mayor of Pittsburgh
- Clara Pratte (M.S.), member of the Arizona Corporation Commission and director of the U.S. Small Business Administration's Office of Native American Affairs
- Jairam Ramesh (Master of Science in public policy and public management), former minister of rural development, Government of India
- Joel Martin Rubin (M.S.), former Deputy Assistant Secretary of State for House Affairs
- Kei Satō (MPM 2010), Japanese politician; member of the House of Councillors; Deputy Chief Cabinet Secretary
- Henry J. Schultz (B.S. 1932), mayor of Easton, Pennsylvania (1976–1980)
- Dennis B. Sullivan (non-degree program), U.S. Air Force brigadier general
- Jeffrey W. Talley (Ph.D. 2000), U.S. Army lieutenant general retired, 32nd chief of Army Reserve (CAR) and 7th commanding general, United States Army Reserve Command (USARC) 2012–2016
- Irene Tinagli (M.S. 2002, Ph.D.), Member of the European Parliament; former Chair of European Parliament Committee on Economic and Monetary Affairs; former Deputy secretary of the Democratic Party
- Charles Erwin Wilson (1909), United States secretary of defense (1953–1957) under President Dwight D. Eisenhower
- Mike Yin (BS 2007), House minority floor leader in the Wyoming House of Representatives
- Yarone Zober (MPM 2000), chief of staff, Mayor's Office, City of Pittsburgh (September 2006–present); former deputy mayor of the City of Pittsburgh (August – September 2006)

=== Literature ===
- Michael Batterberry (attended), writer; co-founder and editor of Food & Wine and Food Arts
- Lisa Jenn Bigelow, author of children's and young adult fiction; Hazel's Theory of Evolution; 2020 Lambda Literary Award winner
- Ruth Cavin (1939), renowned book editor and associate publisher at Thomas Dunne Books for over 900 books
- Michael Chabon (attended), Pulitzer Prize-winning author
- Christina Crawford (attended), author of Mommie Dearest
- Alice Crites (M.A.), researcher at The Washington Post; part of six Pulitzer Prize-winning teams, including the 2018 Pulitzer Prize for Investigative Reporting
- Iris Rainer Dart (1966), author of Beaches
- E. L. Konigsburg (1952), author of children's books and young adult fiction; Newbery Medal and American Library Association award winner
- Jewell Parker Rhodes (B.A. 1975, M.A. 1976, D.A. 1979), novelist
- William Roos, novelist, playwright, and screenwriter
- Manil Suri (Ph.D. 1983), mathematician and writer
- Astro Teller (Ph.D. 1998), author of Exegesis
- Kurt Vonnegut (briefly attended), author, Slaughterhouse Five
- Jeffrey Zaslow, columnist for the Wall Street Journal; co-author of The Last Lecture

=== Performing arts, film, television and video games ===
- Jason Antoon (1994), actor, No Ordinary Family
- Hale Appleman, actor, The Magicians
- William Atherton (1969), film, stage and television actor, Die Hard, The Day of the Locust, The Girl Next Door
- René Auberjonois (1962), actor, Benson, Star Trek: Deep Space Nine, Boston Legal
- William Ball, director, founder of American Conservatory Theater
- Brent Barrett, film and Broadway actor, singer; Chicago, Phantom: The Las Vegas Spectacular, The Producers
- Shari Belafonte, actress, singer, Hotel, Cane River, The Heidi Chronicles
- Natalie Venetia Belcon, actress, singer, originated role of Gary Coleman in Broadway musical Avenue Q
- Paul Ben-Victor (1987), actor, The Wire, The Shield, Entourage
- Benny Benack, orchestra leader, "King of Pittsburgh Dixieland"
- Lourdes Benedicto, actress, NYPD Blue, ER, Dawson's Creek, 24
- Denée Benton (2014), actress, Natasha, Pierre, & the Great Comet of 1812 (Tony nomination for Best Actress in a Leading Role), The Book of Mormon
- Robert Bernat (B.A.), composer and conductor; founder, artistic director, and conductor of the River City Brass Band
- Joseph Beruh (CFA 1950), theatrical producer; produced Broadway and Off-Broadway shows including Godspell, The Magic Show, and American Buffalo
- Steven Bochco (1966), writer, producer, Hill Street Blues, L.A. Law, NYPD Blue; ten-time Emmy Award winner
- Matthew Bomer (2000), actor, White Collar, The Normal Heart, Magic Mike
- Liam Bonner (2004), baritone opera singer
- Christian Borle, actor, Legally Blonde; Tony Award winner in 2012 for Peter and the Starcatcher and in 2015 for Something Rotten!, NBC's Smash
- Barbara Bosson (1970), actress, Hill Street Blues, Murder One
- Abby Brammell (2001), actress, The Unit
- Albert Brooks (attended for two years), actor, screenwriter and director, Finding Nemo, Broadcast News, Lost in America
- Lori Cardille (1976), actress, Day of the Dead
- Anthony Carrigan (2006), actor, Barry
- Jean Carson (1945), actress, The Andy Griffith Show
- Arthur Chadwick (1997), set designer for Accidentally on Purpose
- Donna Lynne Champlin (1993), actress, Crazy Ex Girlfriend
- Carol Channing (1943), Tony Award-winning actress, Hello Dolly!
- Gaius Charles (2005), actor, Friday Night Lights
- François Clemmons (1969), founder/director of Harlem Spiritual Ensemble, special guest, Mister Rogers' Neighborhood
- Kat Coiro, director and writer
- Rhys Coiro (2002), actor, HBO's Entourage
- Frank Converse (1962), actor, Coronet Blue, The Rowdyman, N.Y.P.D.
- Casey Cott (2016), actor, Riverdale
- Corey Cott (2012), actor, Disney's Newsies, Bandstand, Gigi
- Ellen Crawford (1975), actress, Boston Legal
- James Cromwell (1964), actor, known for L.A. Confidential, The General's Daughter, Babe; Oscar nominee and winner of the 2013 Primetime Emmy Award for Outstanding Supporting Actor in a Miniseries or a Movie
- Anne Marie Cummings (B.F.A. 1990), 4X Emmy-nominated TV creator, actress, writer, director of Conversations in L.A.
- Bob Cummings (1930), actor, known for films Dial M for Murder, Saboteur and television's The Bob Cummings Show
- Ted Danson (1972), actor, Cheers, Three Men and a Baby, The Good Place; two-time Emmy Award winner; three-time Golden Globe Award winner
- Joan Darling (1957), actress, Mary Hartman, MASH
- Cote de Pablo (2000), actress, NCIS
- Nicole DeHuff, actress, Meet The Parents, Unbeatable Harold
- Kim Director (2000), actress, Orange is the New Black
- Neal Dodson, film producer
- Dagmara Dominczyk (1998), actress, The Count of Monte Cristo
- Neil Druckmann (2005), writer and creative director at Naughty Dog
- Peggy Eisenhauer (1983), Tony Award-winning lighting designer
- Esteban (1970), flamenco guitarist
- Abe Feder (1930), lighting designer, lighting director
- Barbara Feldon (1955), actress, Get Smart, Fitzwilly, Mad About You
- Jules Fisher (1960), lighting designer; won a Tony Award
- Seth Fisher (2004), director, The Good Wife
- Sutton Foster (left after freshman year), actress, Thoroughly Modern Millie, Anything Goes, Shrek; won two Tony Awards
- Robert Foxworth (1965), actor, Falcon Crest, Six Feet Under
- Mark Frost (1975), producer, Twin Peaks
- Sidney Furie (1955), director and screenwriter, The Ipcress File, The Entity
- Josh Gad (2003), actor, "Olaf" in Frozen, The Book of Mormon, The Wedding Ringer
- Herb Gardner (1956), Tony Award-winning playwright, A Thousand Clowns, I'm Not Rappaport
- Yusuf Gatewood (2002), The Originals, The Umbrella Academy
- Michael Goldenberg (1986), screenwriter and director Harry Potter
- Renée Elise Goldsberry (1993), actress, Tony Award for Hamilton, The Lion King, The Immortal Life of Henrietta Lacks, Rent
- Frank Gorshin (1955), actor, best known as "The Riddler" in the Batman live action television series
- Javier Grillo-Marxuach (1991), television screenwriter, producer, best known for his work on the first two seasons of Lost
- Josh Groban (left after freshman year), singer and Broadway actor, Natasha, Pierre, and the Great Comet of 1812 (Tony Nomination for Best Actor in a Leading Role)
- Demetrius Grosse (2003), Justified
- Ralph Guggenheim (1974), producer, Toy Story
- Charles Haid (1968), actor and director, NYPD Blue, L. A. Law, Doogie Howser, M.D.
- Van Hansis (2004), actor, Luke Snyder of As the World Turns; three-time Emmy Award nominee
- Ian Harding (2009), actor, Pretty Little Liars
- Mariette Hartley (1965), Emmy Award-winning actress, Ride the High Country, Peyton Place, The Incredible Hulk
- Elizabeth Hartman, actress
- Lisa Hartman-Black (1978), actress, Tabitha
- David Haskell (1970), actor (Godspell)
- Ethan Hawke (briefly attended), actor
- Sian Heder (1999), writer, filmmaker; Orange Is The New Black, Tallulah
- Grey Henson (2012), actor, The Book of Mormon, Mean Girls
- Megan Hilty (2004), actress, played Glinda in Wicked, Ivy in TV series Smash, Doralee in Nine to Five
- Leonard "Hub" Hubbard, Grammy Award winner, composer, bassist, The Roots
- Chuck Hittinger (2005), Screamfest, Boogeyman 3
- David Hornsby (1998), actor, screenwriter, producer, It's Always Sunny in Philadelphia
- Holly Hunter (1980), actress; won an Academy Award, two Emmy Awards and a Golden Globe Award
- Sam Hyde (attended for one year), actor, writer, comedian and co-creator of Million Dollar Extreme Presents: World Peace
- Peter Hylenski (1997), sound designer, Tony Award for Best Sound Design winner
- James Jacks (1969), producer, Raising Arizona, The Mummy, The Mummy Returns, Mallrats, Michael, Tombstone
- Cherry Jones (1978), actress; won an Emmy Award and a Tony Award
- David Kagen, actor, Friday the 13th Part VI: Jason Lives
- Caren Kaye (1973, M.S., Ph.D. in Psychology), lead actress, My Tutor
- Arthur Kennedy (1936), actor, 5-time Oscar nominee, Lawrence of Arabia, All My Sons, Elmer Gantry
- Jack Klugman (1948), Emmy Award-winning actor, best known for The Odd Couple, Quincy, M.E.
- Frederick Koehler (1997), actor, Kate and Allie and All My Children
- Michael Kooman, musical theater composer, half of Kooman and Dimond, whose works have been performed at The Kennedy Center, Williamstown Theater Festival, and American Conservatory Theater
- David Lander (1969), actor, Squiggy on the sitcom Laverne and Shirley
- David Larsen (1999), actor, The Book of Mormon
- Eugene Lee (1962), two-time Tony Award-winning scenic designer
- Telly Leung (2002), actor, Allegiance
- Kara Lindsay (2006), actress, Newsies, Beautiful: The Carole King Musical
- Judith Light (1970), Daytime Emmy Award and two-time Tony Award-winning actress, One Life to Live, Who's the Boss?
- Keith Lockhart (1983), conductor of the Boston Pops Orchestra
- Arthur Lubin (1920), film director and producer of the 1943 film Phantom of the Opera and the 1960s TV series Mister Ed
- Jordan Lund (1957), actor Lock Up
- Gabriel Macht (1994), actor, Suits
- Erin Mackey (2008), Broadway, television, and film actress, known for playing Glinda in Wicked
- Henry Mancini (1947), composer; nominated for 72 Grammy Awards, winning 20; also nominated for 18 Academy Awards, winning four
- Joe Manganiello (2000), actor
- Sonia Manzano (1972), actress, writer, Maria Rodriguez on Sesame Street
- Nancy Marchand (1949), actress, known for Lou Grant and HBO's The Sopranos; four-time Emmy Award winner
- Rob Marshall (1982), director; nominated for two Academy Awards (Chicago, Memoirs of a Geisha)
- Henry Mazer, conductor and recording artist for Taipei Philharmonic Orchestra and Chicago Symphony Orchestra
- Gilmer McCormick (1969), actress, Godspell
- John McDaniel, producer, composer, conductor, known for leading the band on The Rosie O'Donnell Show
- Michael McKean (1969), actor and ensemble comedian (Best in Show, Waiting for Guffman, This Is Spinal Tap, Better Call Saul); played Lenny on Laverne and Shirley
- Kennedy McMann (2018), actress, Nancy Drew
- Michael McMillian (2002), True Blood
- James Meena (1973), conductor and opera administrator
- Patina Miller (2006), Tony Award-winning actress (Pippin, Sister Act, All My Children)
- Katy Mixon (2003), actress, Mike & Molly, American Housewife
- Roger Morgan (1961), The Crucifer of Blood
- Greg Mottola (BFA, Art), director, Superbad, The Daytrippers, several episodes of Undeclared and Arrested Development
- Jeffrey Mylett (1971), actor, Godspell
- David Norona (1994), The Mentalist
- Vince O'Brien (1949), Broadway, television, and film actor
- Leslie Odom, Jr. (2003), actor, Hamilton, Red Tails
- Rory O'Malley (2003), actor, The Book of Mormon, Hamilton
- Oopali Operajita (1995), choreographer and classical Odissi and Bharatanatyam dancer
- Stephanie Palmer (1997), Hollywood executive, author of Good in a Room
- Van Dyke Parks, composer, arranger, producer, musician most notably with Brian Wilson and the Beach Boys
- John Pasquin (1969), Emmy Award-winning director
- Victoria Pedretti (2017), actress
- George Peppard (1951), actor, best known for Breakfast at Tiffany's and as John "Hannibal" Smith on The A-Team
- Fern Persons (1934), actress, Risky Business, Hoosiers, Field of Dreams
- John C. Picardi (1996), playwright
- Martin Platt (1971), producer, Vanya and Sonia and Masha and Spike
- Billy Porter (1991), Tony and Emmy Award-winning actor, Kinky Boots, Pose
- Derek Stephen Prince (1991), voice actor, Bleach, Naruto, Love Hina, Cowboy Bebop, Digimon and JoJo's Bizarre Adventure
- Erin Quill, actress, writer, and singer
- Zachary Quinto (1999), actor, played Sylar on Heroes, and Spock in Star Trek (2009 and later films)
- Sally Jessy Raphaël (briefly attended), talk show host
- Lester Rawlins (1950), A Man for All Seasons
- Norman René (1974), theatre and film director; Obie Award winner
- Darren Ritchie (1999), actor/singer
- Kali Rocha (1993), actress, Sledge
- George A. Romero (1960), film director, Night of the Living Dead and Dawn of the Dead
- Ann Roth (1953), film and Broadway costume designer; won an Academy Award and two Emmy Awards
- Polly Rowles (1936), film and TV actor, Springtime in the Rockies, Auntie Mame
- Laura San Giacomo (1984), actress, Just Shoot Me!, Quigley Down Under, Sex, Lies, and Videotape, Pretty Woman
- Lou Scheimer (1952), Flash Gordon
- Mary Kate Schellhardt (BFA 2001), actress, What's Eating Gilbert Grape, Free Willy 2, Apollo 13
- Robert Schmertz (1921), architect and folk musician, CMU faculty and author of the CMU fight song
- Pablo Schreiber (2000), actor, Vicky Cristina Barcelona
- Stephen Schwartz (1968), composer of shows including Wicked, Godspell, and Pippin (originally a Carnegie Mellon production, presented by the Scotch'n'Soda theatrical club on campus under the title Pippin Pippin)
- Roxanne Seeman, songwriter and lyricist
- Kyle Selig (2014), actor, The Book of Mormon, Mean Girls
- Sushma Seth (1960), Bollywood actress, Junoon, Ram Teri Ganga Maili
- Mel Shapiro (1961), An Actor Performs, Two Gentlemen of Verona
- Leigh Silverman (1996), producer, Violet
- Emily Skinner (1992), musical theater actress; nominated for a Tony Award alongside Side Show co-star Alice Ripley
- Jamie Smith (1947), actor, The Faithful City, Killer's Kiss
- Josef Sommer (1957), actor, Dirty Harry, Absence of Malice, Witness
- Aaron Staton (2004), actor, Mad Men
- Patricia Tallman (1979), actress and stunt woman, played Lyta Alexander on Babylon 5, Barbara in 1990 remake of Night of the Living Dead
- John-Michael Tebelak (1971, MFA), playwright and director (Godspell; originally a Carnegie Mellon production)
- Irene Tedrow (1929), actress ,Eleanor and Franklin, James at 16, Bonanza
- Jim Tetlow (1977), lighting designer and theatre consultant; won an Emmy Award for lighting design
- Thom Thomas (1963), playwright, Without Apologies
- Sada Thompson (1949), actress, Family
- Susan Tsu, costume designer
- Michael Tucker (1966), actor, L.A. Law
- Tamara Tunie (1981), actress, Law & Order: Special Victims Unit
- William J. G. Turner (1974), composer, director, dramatist, producer, and actor
- Blair Underwood (1988), actor, L.A. Law, LAX, Gattaca, Sex and the City
- Michelle Veintimilla (2014), actress, Not Cool
- Paula Wagner (1969), film producer and executive
- Loudon Wainwright III, musician; withdrew in 1967
- Bruce Weitz (1966), actor, Hill Street Blues, Deep Impact
- John Wells (1970), writer, producer, China Beach, ER, The West Wing, Third Watch; won an Emmy Award
- Ming-Na Wen (1986), actress, ER, The Joy Luck Club; Annie Award winner as voice of "Mulan" in Mulan; voice of Aki Ross in Final Fantasy: The Spirits Within
- Daniel Wilson (2003, 2004, 2005), TV host, The Works, writer, How to Survive a Robot Uprising
- Patrick Wilson (1995), actor; nominated for a Tony Award, an Emmy Award, and a Golden Globe Award
- George Wood (1945), actor, Harold and Maude
- Bud Yorkin (1948), producer, director, writer, actor (All in the Family, Maude, Good Times, Sanford and Son, One Day at a Time, Diff'rent Strokes)
- Krista Marie Yu (2011), actress, Dr. Ken, Last Man Standing, Reboot

=== Science and technology ===
- Kimberly W. Anderson (Ph.D.), chemist, Gill Eminent Professor, Chemical and Materials Engineering, associate dean for Administration and Academic Affairs in the College of Engineering at the University of Kentucky
- Antonio Arizabal (M.S., Ph.D.), Filipino chemist and metallurgist; former Secretary of the Department of Science and Technology of the Philippines
- Andrea Arpaci-Dusseau (B.S. 1991), author, professor, faculty member in the Computer Sciences Department at University of Wisconsin-Madison, ACM Fellow, winner of SIGOPS Mark Weiser Award.
- Allen Barnett (1966), principal investigator of the DARPA-funded Consortium for Very High Efficiency Solar Cells
- Andy Bechtolsheim (M.S. 1976), co-founder of Sun Microsystems; Mmanaging director of Cisco 1996–2002; chief architect of Sun Microsystems 2003–2005; an original investor in Google, and the first person to document the company name
- Joshua Bloch (Ph.D. 1990), chief Java architect of Google, author of Jolt Award-winning book Effective Java
- Nik Bonaddio (B.S. 2004, M.S. 2005), founder of numberFire
- Nathaniel Borenstein (M.S. 1981, Ph.D. 1985), chief open standards strategist and Distinguished Engineer at IBM, co-creator of MIME for formatting multimedia email
- Noam Brown (M.S. 2014, Ph.D. 2020), computer scientist; co-creator of Libratus and Pluribus; research scientist at OpenAI
- Mark Canepa (B.S. 1976, M.S. 1977), executive vice president of Network Storage Products Group, then Data Management for Sun Microsystems
- Jane C. Charlton (B.S. 1983), professor of astronomy and astrophysics, received her B.S. at age 18
- Harshvardhan Chunawala (M.S. 2023), cybersecurity researcher, early contributor of Carnegie Mellon Mission Control and first lunar rover mission operator from the Information Networking Institute
- Bob Colwell (Ph.D.), chief architect of Intel Pentium Pro
- Joseph DeCarolis (Ph.D. 2004), energy systems researcher; former Administrator of the U.S. Energy Information Administration
- Robert Dennard (Ph.D. 1958), inventor of dynamic random access memory (DRAM); IBM Fellow; proved the theories leading to Moore's Law
- Oren Etzioni (Ph.D. 1991), computer scientist; founding CEO of the Allen Institute for Artificial Intelligence (AI2)
- Scott Fahlman (professor), creator of the emoticon
- Gerald Gardner (1922–2009), geophysicist and social activist whose statistical analysis led to the banning of classified advertising segregated by gender in a 1973 ruling by the U.S. Supreme Court
- Charles Geschke (Ph.D. 1973), co-founder of Adobe Systems
- James J. Gillogly (Ph.D. 1978), cryptographer who was the first to publicly solve parts 1-3 of Kryptos
- Virgil D. Gligor, pioneer in computer security and co-director of Carnegie Mellon's CYLAB
- James Gosling (M.S. 1983, Ph.D. 1983), vice president and fellow of Sun Microsystems, creator of Java programming language
- Severin Hacker (Ph.D. 2014), co-founder of Duolingo
- William Walter Hay (B.S. 1931), professor of railway engineering at the University of Illinois Urbana-Champaign remembered with the American Railway Engineering and Maintenance-of-Way Association Hay Award
- Maynard Holliday, robotics engineer; Assistant Secretary of Defense for Critical Technologies in the Office of Under Secretary of Defense for Research and Engineering, and former technology officer at The Pentagon
- Feng-hsiung Hsu (Ph.D. 1990), co-creator of ChipTest (while at CMU), the predecessor of Deep Thought, which evolved into Deep Blue at IBM
- Phil Karn (M.S. 1979), engineer; his name is on at least six RFCs; inventor of Karn's Algorithm, a method for calculating the round trip time for IP packet retransmission
- Vinod Khosla (M.S. 1978), co-founder of Sun Microsystems, venture capitalist at Kleiner, Perkins, Caufield & Byers
- James H. Kindelberger (1920), pioneer of aviation, chairman of North American Aviation (1948–1960)
- Monica S. Lam (Ph.D. 1987), computer scientist, ACM Fellow, and founder of Omlet
- Kai-Fu Lee (Ph.D. 1988, assistant professor), former president of Google China
- Ira N. Levine (B.A. 1958), author, professor and faculty member in the Chemistry Department at Brooklyn College
- Qi Lu (Ph.D. 1996), president of Online Services Division, Microsoft, former executive vice president at Yahoo!
- Mao Yisheng (Ph.D. 1919), bridge engineering expert, first Ph.D. graduate of Carnegie Tech
- Edgar Mitchell (B.S. 1952), astronaut, 6th man to walk on the Moon
- James G. Mitchell (Ph.D. 1970), computer scientist, vice president and fellow of Sun Microsystems, developer of WATFOR compiler
- Nikolai Mushegian (B.S. 2014), computer scientist and software engineer who contributed to software platforms supporting decentralized autonomous organizations and decentralized finance
- Harvey C. Nathanson (B.S., M.S., Ph.D.), inventor of first MEMS device, former chief scientist at Northrop Grumman
- Bruce J. Nelson (Ph.D. 1981), inventor of the Remote procedure call for computer communications
- Andrew Ng (B.S. 1997), professor at Stanford University and co-founder of Coursera
- John Ousterhout (Ph.D. 1980), inventor of the Tcl scripting language
- David Parnas (M.S. 1964, Ph.D. 1965), early pioneer of software engineering
- Randy Pausch (Ph.D. 1988, professor), founder of Alice (software), and the man behind "The Last Lecture"
- Drew D. Perkins (B.S. 1986), author of Point-to-Point Protocol (PPP)
- Judith Resnik (B.S. 1970), astronaut who died in the Challenger accident during the launch of the mission STS-51-L
- Mark Russinovich (B.S., Ph.D. 1994), Windows expert and technical fellow of Microsoft
- Mahadev Satyanarayanan (Ph.D. 1983), principal computer architect of Coda and Andrew File System
- Joshua Schachter (B.S. 1996), founder of del.icio.us
- Jonathan I. Schwartz (transferred to Wesleyan University), CEO of Sun Microsystems
- Harry Shum (Ph.D. 1996), corporate vice president, Microsoft
- Pradeep Sindhu (Ph.D. 1982), co-founder and CTO of Juniper Networks
- Javier Soltero (B.S. 1997), former founder and CEO of Hyperic, former CTO of SaaS at VMware, founder and current CEO of Acompli
- Ivan Sutherland (B.S. 1959), vice president and fellow of Sun Microsystems
- Shanghua Teng, professor of Computer Science at Boston University and winner of Gödel Prize
- Avie Tevanian (M.S. 1985, Ph.D. 1988), former Apple CTO
- Filemon Uriarte Jr. (Ph.D. 1970), former Secretary of the Department of Science and Technology of the Philippines
- Vincent Van Brunt (B.S. 1967), chemical engineer
- Philip Wadler (Ph.D. 1984), computer scientist, creator of Orwell and ACM Fellow
- Richard Wallace (Ph.D. 1989), chairman and co-founder of the A.L.I.C.E. Artificial Intelligence Foundation; author of Artificial Intelligence Markup Language; botmaster of the chatbot A.L.I.C.E.
- Earl L. Warrick, inventor of Silly Putty and developer of silicone rubber.
- Red Whittaker (M.S. 1975, Ph.D. 1979), professor at CMU; led CMU teams that won second and third place in the DARPA Grand Challenge in 2005 and first place in 2007
- Dan Wilson (Ph.D. 2021), biologist and science communicator
- Yishan Wong (B.S. 2001), chief executive officer of Reddit Inc.

=== Sports ===
- Nada Arkaji, first woman to represent Qatar at the Olympic Games
- Dwight "Dike" Beede, college football coach who created and introduced the penalty flag
- Howard Harpster (1928), All-American quarterback, inducted into College Football Hall of Fame, led defeat of Knute Rockne's Notre Dame Fighting Irish
- Brian Harvey, distance runner, 3-time Olympic trials qualifier
- Rich Lackner (1979), current Carnegie Mellon head football coach
- Hans Lobert, Major League Baseball player, manager
- John McGraw (born Roy Elmer Hoar), Major League Baseball player, not to be confused with hall-of-famer John McGraw
- Aron Ralston (1997), mountain climber, subject of the film 127 Hours
- Herb Sendek (1985), men's basketball head coach, Santa Clara, Arizona State, and North Carolina State
- Lloyd Yoder (1923–26), College Football Hall of Fame tackle, NBC executive, football official (1928–52)

==== NFL ====
- Merl Condit, end, Brooklyn Dodgers, Pittsburgh Steelers (1940–1946)
- Bull Karcis, fullback, Brooklyn Dodgers, New York Giants (1932–1943)
- Hap Moran, end, Frankford Yellow Jackets, New York Giants (1926–1933)
- Bill Rieth, center, Cleveland Rams (1941–1945)
- Jimmy Robertson, fullback, halfback, Akron Pros (1924–1925)
- Joe Rudolph, guard, Philadelphia Eagles, San Francisco 49ers (1995, 1997)
- Hugh Sprinkle, tackle, Akron Pros (1923–1925)
- Ray Tesser, end, Pittsburgh Pirates (1933–1934)
- Alejandro Villanueva (MBA 2019), offensive tackle, Pittsburgh Steelers, Baltimore Ravens (2014–2021) (attended for MBA only; did not play for Carnegie Mellon)

== Notable faculty ==
=== Nobel laureates ===
- Clinton Davisson (professor), Nobel Prize in Physics, 1937
- Paul Flory (research associate, Mellon Institute), Nobel Prize in Chemistry, 1974
- Lars Peter Hansen (professor), Bank of Sweden Prize in Economic Sciences, 2013
- Geoffrey Hinton (professor 1982–1987), Nobel Prize in Physics, 2024
- Walter Kohn (professor), Nobel Prize in Chemistry, 1998
- Finn E. Kydland (Ph.D. 1973, professor), Bank of Sweden Prize in Economic Sciences, 2004
- Paul Lauterbur (research associate, Mellon Institute, 1951–1953), Nobel Prize in Physiology or Medicine, 2003
- Robert Lucas Jr (professor), Bank of Sweden Prize in Economic Sciences, 1995
- Merton Miller (professor), Bank of Sweden Prize in Economic Sciences, 1990
- Franco Modigliani (professor), Bank of Sweden Prize in Economic Sciences, 1985
- John Pople (professor 1964–1993), Nobel Prize in Chemistry, 1998
- Edward C. Prescott (Ph.D. 1967, professor 1971–1980), Bank of Sweden Prize in Economic Sciences, 2004
- Herbert A. Simon (professor, 1949–2001), Bank of Sweden Prize in Economic Sciences, 1978
- Otto Stern (professor), Nobel Prize in Physics, 1943
- Ada Yonath (postdoctoral researcher, 1969), Nobel Prize in Chemistry, 2009

=== Turing Award recipients ===
- Manuel Blum (professor 1999–2018), computational complexity theory, 1995
- Edmund M. Clarke (professor 1982–2020), model checking, 2007
- Robert Floyd (professor 1963–1968), methodologies for the creation of efficient and reliable software, 1978
- Geoffrey Hinton (professor 1982–1987), artificial intelligence, 2018
- Allen Newell (Ph.D. 1957, professor 1961–1992), artificial intelligence, 1975
- Alan Perlis (B.S. 1943, professor 1956–1971), compiler construction, 1966; first Turing Award winner
- Raj Reddy (professor 1969–present), artificial intelligence, 1994
- Dana S. Scott (professor 1981–2003), nondeterministic machines, 1976
- Herbert A. Simon (professor), artificial intelligence, 1975
- Leslie Valiant (professor 1973–1974), machine learning, 2010

=== Kyoto Prize recipients ===
- Takeo Kanade (professor), information science, 2016

=== Wolf Prize recipients ===
- Krzysztof Matyjaszewski (professor), Wolf Prize in Chemistry, 2011
- John Pople (professor 1964–1993), Wolf Prize in Chemistry, 1992

=== Stockholm Prize in Criminology winners ===
- Alfred Blumstein (professor), operations researcher and criminologist, 2007

=== National Medal of Science recipients ===
- Paul Lauterbur (research associate, Mellon Institute, 1951–1953), Physical Sciences, 1987
- Allen Newell (Ph.D. 1957, professor), Mathematical, Statistical, and Computer Sciences, 1992
- Herbert A. Simon (professor), Behavior and Social Sciences, 1986

=== National Medal of Technology recipients ===
- Watts Humphrey (professor), software engineering, 2003
- Paul Lauterbur (research associate, Mellon Institute, 1951–1953), magnetic resonance technology, 1988
- Mary Shaw (professor), software engineering, 2014

=== MacArthur Fellows ===
- Terrance Hayes, professor of poetry (2001–2013)
- Yoky Matsuoka, assistant professor affiliated with the Robotics Institute, the Department of Mechanical Engineering, and the Center for the Neural Basis of Cognition (2001–2006), 2007
- Anna Deavere Smith, acting instructor (1970–1971), 1996
- Dawn Song (M.S. 1999), professor of computer science (2002–2007), 2010
- Luis von Ahn (Ph.D. 2005), assistant professor of computer science, 2006

=== Members of National Academy of Sciences ===
- John Anderson (professor), Psychology, 1999
- Marlene Behrmann (professor 1993–present), Psychology, 2015
- Gordon Bell (professor 1966–1972), Computer and Information Sciences, 2007
- Brian Berry (professor 1981–1986), Human Environmental Sciences, 1975
- Manuel Blum (professor), Computer and Information Sciences, 2002
- Richard Duffin (professor 1946–1988), Applied Mathematical Sciences, 1972
- Stephen Fienberg (professor), Applied Mathematical Sciences, 1999
- Robert Griffiths (professor), Computer and Information Sciences, 1987
- Walter Kohn (professor 1950–1960), Physics, 1969
- Paul Lauterbur (research associate, Mellon Institute, 1951–1953), Physics, 1985
- Robert Lucas Jr (professor 1963–1974), Economic Sciences, 1981
- James G. March (professor 1953–1964), Social and Political Sciences, 1973
- James McClelland (professor 1984–2006), Psychology, 2001
- Franco Modigliani (professor 1952–1960), Economic Sciences, 1973
- Allen Newell (Ph.D 1957, professor), Computer and Information Sciences, 1972
- Robert Parr (professor 1948–1962), Chemical Sciences, 2004
- Kathryn Roeder (professor 1994–present), Statistics and Computational Biology, 2019
- Dana Scott (professor), Computer and Information Sciences, 1988
- Herbert A. Simon (professor), Computer and Information Sciences, 1967
- Otto Stern (professor 1933–1945), Physics, 1945
- Harrison White (professor 1957–1959), Social and Political Sciences, 1975
- Lincoln Wolfenstein (professor), Physics, 1978

=== Members of National Academy of Engineering ===
- Hubert Aaronson (B.S. 1948, Ph.D. 1954, professor), Materials Engineering, 1997
- John L. Anderson (professor), Chemical Engineering, 1992
- Nadine Aubry (professor), Mechanical Engineering, 2011
- Egon Balas (professor, 1967–2019), Industrial, Manufacturing & Operational Systems Engineering, 2006
- Gordon Bell (professor 1966–1972), Computer Science & Engineering, 1977
- Daniel Berg (professor 1977–1983), Special Fields & Interdisciplinary Engineering, 1976
- Lorenz Biegler (professor), Chemical Engineering, 2013
- Jacobo Bielak (professor), Civil Engineering, 2010
- Manuel Blum (professor), Computer Science & Engineering, 2006
- Alfred Blumstein (professor), Industrial, Manufacturing & Operational Systems Engineering, 1998
- Randal Bryant (professor), Computer Science & Engineering, 2003
- George Bugliarello (professor 1959–1969), Civil Engineering, 1987
- Edmund M. Clarke (professor), Computer Science & Engineering, 2005
- Jared L. Cohon (professor), Civil Engineering, 2012
- Gérard Cornuéjols (professor), Industrial, Manufacturing & Operational Systems Engineering, 2016
- Ignacio E. Grossmann (professor), Chemical Engineering, 2000
- Chris T. Hendrickson (professor), Civil Engineering, 2011
- Takeo Kanade (professor), Computer Science & Engineering, 1997
- Mark Kryder (professor), Electronics Engineering, 1994
- Krzysztof Matyjaszewski (professor), Materials Engineering, 2006
- Tom M. Mitchell (professor), Computer Science & Engineering, 2010
- C. D. Mote, Jr. (professor 1965–1967), Mechanical Engineering, 1988
- Allen Newell (Ph.D 1957, professor), Computer Science & Engineering, 1980
- Alan Perlis (B.S. 1943, professor), Computer Science & Engineering, 1977
- Richard Rashid (professor, 1979–1991), Computer Science & Engineering, 2003
- Bhakta B. Rath (professor), Materials engineering, 2008
- Raj Reddy (professor), Computer Science & Engineering, 1984
- Daniel P. Siewiorek (professor), Computer Science & Engineering, 2000
- Alfred Spector (professor, 1981–1992), Computer Science & Engineering, 2004
- Guy L. Steele Jr. (professor 1980–1994), Computer Science & Engineering, 2001
- Sridhar Tayur (professor), Industrial, Manufacturing & Operational Systems Engineering, 2017
- Joseph F Traub (professor 1971–1979), Computer Science & Engineering, 1985
- Manuela M. Veloso (professor), Computer Science & Engineering, 2022
- William Wulf (professor 1968–1981), Computer Science & Engineering, 1993

=== Other prominent faculty ===
- Igor Ansoff (professor), "father of strategic management" and professor of Industrial Administration
- Jerome Apt (professor), former NASA astronaut and now professor of technology; executive director of Carnegie Mellon Electricity Industry Center, Graduate School of Industrial Administration
- Elizabeth Bailey (professor 1983–1991), former dean and professor of Economics, Industrial Administration and Public Policy, Graduate School of Industrial Administration, now John C. Hower Professor of Business and Public Policy at Wharton School of the University of Pennsylvania
- Lenore Blum (professor), renowned for being a National Science Foundation Career Advancement Award winner and for her contributions to computer science, wife of Manuel Blum
- Peter Braam (professor), computer scientist, founder of Lustre file system, Intermezzo file system
- Kathleen Carley (professor), computational sociologist and pioneer of dynamic network analysis
- William W. Cooper (professor), professor of operations research and accounting at the Tepper School of Business and founding dean of the Heinz College
- Lorrie Cranor (professor), expert in information privacy and Chief Technologist of the Federal Trade Commission
- Edward Creutz (professor), physics, the Manhattan Project
- Anthony Daniels (adjunct professor), actor, portrayed C-3PO in the Star Wars films
- Robyn Dawes (professor), pioneer in the field of mathematical psychology
- Scott Dodelson (professor, 2017–present), astrophysicist and former Fermilab scientist
- David Farber (professor, 2003–present), co-creator of ARPANET and former chief technologist for the FCC
- Richard Florida (professor, 1987–2005), economist and author of Rise of the Creative Class
- David Garlan (professor, 1990–present), pioneer in software architecture and self-adaptive software systems
- Francesca Gino, Italian-American behavioral scientist
- James Goodby (professor, 1989–present), Distinguished Service Professor of Engineering and Public Policy, former U.S. Foreign Service officer including US ambassador to Finland (1980–1981)
- William D. Haseman (faculty member, 1975–1980), IBM Professor of Information Technology Management at the University of Wisconsin-Milwaukee, founding director of the Center for Technology Innovation in Milwaukee, and author
- John Heinz III (faculty member, 1970–1971), Senator from Pennsylvania
- Robert Hess (1938–1994), president of Brooklyn College
- Israel Hicks (1943–2010), stage director who presented August Wilson's entire 10-play Pittsburgh Cycle
- Henry Hornbostel (professor), helped found the Carnegie Mellon School of Architecture; designed the original buildings on campus
- Watts Humphrey (professor), former vice president of IBM, fellow of Software Engineering Institute
- Jeffrey Hunker (professor), senior director for Critical Infrastructure for the United States National Security Council (1999–2001), deputy assistant to the secretary of commerce (1996–1998), senior Department of Commerce official for environmental policy (1996–1998), former senior policy advisor to the secretary of commerce (1993–1996), former dean of the Heinz College
- Robert Kaplan (professor), co-creator of the Balanced Scorecard
- Michael Keaton (adjunct professor), actor known for films such as Beetlejuice, Batman, and Batman Returns
- Roberta Klatzky (professor), cognitive scientist and leading researcher in haptics
- Mordecai Lawner, actor and former faculty member for the theater program
- Jennifer Lerner, decision scientist and psychologist in the Department of Social and Decision Sciences
- Golan Levin, new media artist and current faculty member of the School of Art
- Margot Livesey, author of six novels, short stories, and essays on fiction
- George Loewenstein (professor), pioneer in the field of Behavioural Economics and faculty in the Department of Social and Decision Sciences
- Brian MacWhinney (professor), leading language acquisition researcher and creator of CHILDES database
- Allan Meltzer (professor), chairperson of a special U.S. congressional commission that studied how the World Bank and the International Monetary Fund operated; it made its recommendations for changes in March 2000 in its report to the U.S. Congress
- Britt Ransom (associate professor), artist and sculptor
- Richard Rashid (professor, 1979–1991), computer scientist, Microsoft Research SVP
- Robert V. Rice (professor), biochemist and leading researcher in smooth muscle myosin
- Scott Sandage (professor), noted cultural historian in the Dietrich College of Humanities and Social Sciences
- Robert Schmertz (professor), folk artist and professor of architecture
- Walter Dill Scott (professor, 1916–1918), pioneer in applied psychology, president of the American Psychological Association, president of Northwestern University
- Mel Shapiro (head of Drama Department), Tony Award-winning writer and director
- Robert S. Siegler (professor), Teresa Heinz Professor of Psychology at Carnegie Mellon University and recipient of the American Psychological Association's 2005 Distinguished Scientific Contribution Award
- Daniel Sleator (professor), Paris Kanellakis Award-winning professor of computer science known for inventing data structures such as the splay tree
- Alfred Spector (professor), vice president of Research and Special Initiatives at Google
- Latanya Sweeney (professor), former chief technologist of the Federal Trade Commission
- Joel A. Tarr (professor), noted environmental historian in the Dietrich College of Humanities and Social Sciences
- Joe William Trotter Jr. (professor), eminent scholar of African American labor and urban life in the Dietrich College of Humanities and Social Sciences, and elected member of the American Academy of Arts and Sciences
- Honus Wagner, baseball and basketball coach, one of the first five members of the Baseball Hall of Fame
- Arnold R. Weber (professor and provost), professor in economics and public policy at Carnegie Mellon and president of the University of Colorado and Northwestern University
- Jerome Wolken (1917–1999), biophysicist and head of biology department
- Clarence Zener (professor, 1968–1993), theoretical physicist, namesake of the Zener diode, Zener voltage, and Zener pinning

== Presidents of Carnegie Mellon University ==
The following persons have served as president of Carnegie Mellon University:

| No. | Image | President | Term start | Term end | Ref. |
|---|---|---|---|---|---|
President of Carnegie Technical Schools (1900–1912)
| 1 | | Arthur Hamerschlag | 1903 | 1922 | |
Presidents of Carnegie Institute of Technology (1912–1967)
| 2 | | Thomas Baker | 1922 | 1935 | |
| 3 | | Robert Doherty | 1936 | 1950 | |
| 4 | | John Warner | 1950 | January 31, 1965 | |
Presidents of Carnegie Mellon University (1967–present)
| 5 | | Guyford Stever | February 1, 1965 | January 31, 1972 (Note: Resigned to head NSF.) | |
| interim | | Edward R. Schatz | February 1, 1972 | June 30, 1972 | |
| 6 | | Richard Cyert | July 1, 1972 | June 30, 1990 | |
| 7 | | Robert Mehrabian | July 1, 1990 | June 30, 1997 | |
| 8 | | Jared Cohon | July 1, 1997 | June 30, 2013 | |
| 9 | | Subra Suresh | July 1, 2013 | June 30, 2017 | |
| interim | | Farnam Jahanian | July 1, 2017 | March 8, 2018 | |
| 10 | | Farnam Jahanian | March 8, 2018 | present | |

Table notes:

== Founders and major benefactors of Carnegie Mellon University ==
- Andrew Carnegie, industrialist and philanthropist who founded and endowed the university as the Carnegie Technical Schools in 1900
- William S. Dietrich II, steel industrialist whose gift prompted the renaming of the College of Humanities and Social Sciences to the Dietrich College of Humanities and Social Sciences
- Teresa Heinz, and the Heinz family, heirs to the H.J. Heinz Company fortune; political family who renamed the School of Urban and Public Affairs to the Heinz College after United States senator H. John Heinz III
- David Tepper, billionaire Wall Street hedge fund manager whose gift renamed the Graduate School of Industrial Administration to the Tepper School of Business

The Mellon Family of Pittsburgh:

- Andrew W. Mellon, United States secretary of the treasury 1921–1932; co-founded the Mellon Institute of Research in 1913
- Paul Mellon, philanthropist, horse breeder, facilitator of the merger between the Carnegie Institute of Technology and the Mellon Institute to form Carnegie Mellon University
- Richard B. Mellon, president of Mellon Bank; co-founded the Mellon Institute of Research in 1913
- Richard King Mellon, president and chairman of Mellon Bank, known for his urban renewal program in Pittsburgh and the founder of the School of Urban and Public Affairs
- William Larimer Mellon, Sr., founder of Gulf Oil and the Graduate School of Industrial Administration

== Fictional alumni ==
- Eleanor Bartlet, first daughter of the United States in The West Wing
- Ben Bruckner, main character in Queer as Folk
- Delilah Fielding-McGee, Department of Defense employee and the girlfriend/wife of Timothy McGee in NCIS, as revealed in S22 E17
- Theodore Donald Finch, a computer hacker in The Core
- Doctor Colette Green, research associate from the PC game Half-Life: Decay
- Dr. Bunsen Honeydew, scientist from The Muppet Show who graduated from "Carnegie-Melonhead University"
- Brian Kinney, main character in Queer as Folk
- Gabriel LaRoche, NCIS deputy director in NCIS, as revealed in S22 E17
- Johanna 'Jo' Mitchell, main character of film Mean Girls 2
- Randall and Beth Pearson, characters on This is Us, met while attending the school
- Sebastian Shaw, the Black King of the Hellfire Club of the Marvel Universe (Earth-616)
- Bethany Sloane, main character of the film Dogma
- Jaime Sommers, title character of The Bionic Woman

== See also ==
- Category:Carnegie Mellon University faculty
