= Biegler =

Biegler is a surname. Notable people with the surname include:

- Franz Biegler (1894–?), Austrian footballer
- George W. Biegler (1869–1929), United States Army captain
- Lorenz Biegler
- Michael Biegler (born 1961), German handball coach
- Steven Biegler (born 1959), American priest

== Fictional characters ==
- Lieutenant Biegler (Cadet Biegler) from The Good Soldier Švejk
