= Kim Anderson =

Kim Anderson may refer to:

- Kim Anderson (American football) (born 1957), American football player
- Kim Anderson (basketball) (born 1955), American basketball coach
- Kim Anderson (cyclist) (born 1968), American female cyclist
- Kim Anderson (singer) (born 1981), bassist for the band Flee the Seen
- Kim Anderson, the former husband of Stevie Nicks (born 1948)
- Kim Anderzon (1943–2014), Swedish actress
- Kim Anderson (professor) (born 1964), Canadian professor
- Kimberly W. Anderson, American chemist

== See also ==
- Kim Andersson (born 1982), Swedish handball player
- Kim W. Andersson (born 1979), Swedish illustrator
- Kim Andersen (disambiguation)
