= Tom Szkutak =

American businessman

- Education: Boston University
- Occupation: Businessman
- Employer: Amazon (2002—2015)

Tom Szkutak was Chief Financial Officer (CFO) and senior vice president at Amazon.com. Szkutak joined Amazon.com in October 2002 after 20 years at General Electric. On September 3, 2014, it was announced Szkutak will be leaving Amazon in June 2015 to pursue other interests and spend more time with his family. He was succeeded by Brian Olsavsky in late 2015.

Before joining Amazon.com, Szkutak served as CFO for GE Lighting. Prior to CFO position, Szkutak oversaw the GE Plastics finance operations for Europe, the Middle East, Africa and India. In addition, he was executive vice president of finance for GE Investments in Stamford, Connecticut.

Szkutak received a BS, magna cum laude, in finance from Boston University.

== Awards and recognition ==
In 2014, AdvisoryCloud ranked Tom Szkutak as a Top CFO on its Top Financial Executive List.
