= Kim Andersen =

Kim Andersen may refer to:

- Kim Andersen (cyclist) (born 1958), former professional Danish road bicycle racer and current cycling team directeur sportif
- Kim Andersen (jockey) (born 1963), jockey in Scandinavian horse racing
- Kim Andersen (sailor) (born 1957), president of World Sailing
- Kim Edberg Andersen (born 1973), Danish politician
- Kim Andersen (politician) (born 1957), Danish politician for Venstre

== See also ==
- Kim Anderson (disambiguation)
- Kim Andersson (born 1982), Swedish handball player
