= John Swearingen =

American business executive

John E. Swearingen
- Born: John Eldred Swearingen; September 7, 1918; Columbia, South Carolina, U.S.
- Died: September 14, 2007 (aged 89)
- Education: University of South Carolina (BS); Carnegie Institute of Technology (MS)
- Occupation: Business executive
- Years active: 1939–1987
- Employer(s): Standard Oil Company (Indiana) / Amoco, Continental Illinois Bank (interim)
- Known for: Chairman and CEO of Standard Oil Company (Indiana), later Amoco
- Notable work: Think Ahead (memoir, 2004)
- Title: Chairman and CEO, Standard Oil Company (Indiana); Chairman and CEO, Continental Illinois Bank
- Board member of: Chase Manhattan Bank; First National Bank of Chicago; Sara Lee Corporation; Lockheed Corporation; McGraw Wildlife Foundation
- Parent(s): John E. Swearingen Sr., Mary Hough Swearingen
- Awards: Herbert Hoover Humanitarian Award (1980); Charles F. Rand Memorial Gold Medal (1980); Washington Award (1981); API Gold Medal for Distinguished Achievement (1983)

John Eldred Swearingen (1918–2007) was an American petroleum industry executive who was chief executive officer and chairman of Standard Oil Company (Indiana), later known as Amoco, for 23 years. He was a spokesperson during the energy crisis of the 1970s and played a role in stabilising Continental Illinois Bank during a financial crisis.

== Early life and education ==
John Eldred Swearingen was born on September 7, 1918, in Columbia, South Carolina, to John E. Swearingen (Sr.) and Mary Hough Swearingen. His father was the state superintendent of education while also managing farming operations. Swearingen enrolled at the University of South Carolina at the age of 16 on a scholarship and graduated Phi Beta Kappa in 1938 with a bachelor's degree in chemical engineering. He then pursued further studies at Carnegie Tech (now Carnegie Mellon University), earning a Master of Science degree in chemical engineering in 1939.

== Career ==
In 1939, during the Great Depression, Swearingen began his career with Standard Oil Company (Indiana) as a chemical engineer at its research center in Whiting. At the outset of World War II, he contributed to the company's conversion to producing aviation fuel and TNT, which exempted him from military service. Following the war, he led a team of researchers studying the economics of crude oil, natural gas, and gasoline. His presentations to the corporate executive committee accelerated his advancement, including a 1947 transfer to Tulsa, Oklahoma, to work in the company’s hydrocarbon exploration and production subsidiary. By 1950, he was appointed division manager in Oklahoma City, and in 1951, he returned to Chicago as the general manager of production. Swearingen was named a director in 1952, became president in 1958, and was appointed CEO in 1960. He was CEO and chairman of the board until his retirement in 1983. During his tenure, Standard Oil (Indiana) expanded its international hydrocarbon exploration and production efforts, and its net earnings increased substantially, establishing it among the top firms in the Fortune 500. The company later evolved into Amoco in 1985. Swearingen chaired the National Petroleum Council (1974–75) and the American Petroleum Institute (1978–79), and was a spokesperson for the industry during the energy crisis of the 1970s. Following his retirement from Amoco, Swearingen was called upon by the Federal Deposit Insurance Corporation in 1984 to rescue Continental Illinois Bank, which was experiencing severe financial difficulties. As chairman and CEO, he stabilized the bank, restructured its management, and recruited new executives before retiring for a second time in 1987.

== Board memberships and honors ==
Throughout his career, Swearingen was on the boards of several major corporations and institutions, including Chase Manhattan Bank, First National Bank of Chicago, Sara Lee Corporation, Lockheed Corporation, and the McGraw Wildlife Foundation. He was a life trustee of Carnegie Mellon University and Northwestern Memorial Hospital in Chicago. His professional and humanitarian achievements were recognized with numerous awards, including the Herbert Hoover Humanitarian Award (1980), the Charles F. Rand Memorial Gold Medal from the American Institute of Mining, Metallurgical, and Petroleum Engineers (1980), the Washington Award from the Western Society of Engineers (1981), and the Gold Medal for Distinguished Achievement from the American Petroleum Institute (1983). In 1987, the University of South Carolina honored him by dedicating its new College of Engineering facility as the John E. Swearingen Engineering Center. His memoir, Think Ahead, was published in 2004.

== Death ==
John E. Swearingen died on September 14, 2007, at the age of 89.
