= Rob Linsenmeier =

Rob Linsenmeier is a researcher and Professor at Northwestern University, and lives in Chicago. He is Professor Emeritus of Biomedical Engineering and Neurobiology & Physiology. He has taught Animal Physiology in the Biology Program.

Linsenmeier was educated at Carnegie Mellon University, Northwestern University and the University of California, San Francisco.

He has received funding for his work from the National Eye Institute. His work has been on the oxygenation of the retinas of cats, which serves as a good model for the human retina. He was the winner of the 2007 Theo C. Pilkington Outstanding Educator Award. He is also a fellow of the American Institute for Medical and Biological Engineering.

In 2007, he and Professor Ann McKenna set up the Northwestern Center for Engineering Education Research (NCEER).

He is married to Joan A. W. Linsenmeier, who has worked in the Psychology Department and the Dean's office in the Weinberg College of Arts and Sciences at Northwestern; they have three children.
