= Leslie John =

Harvard Business School tenured professor, scientist, and author

Leslie K. John
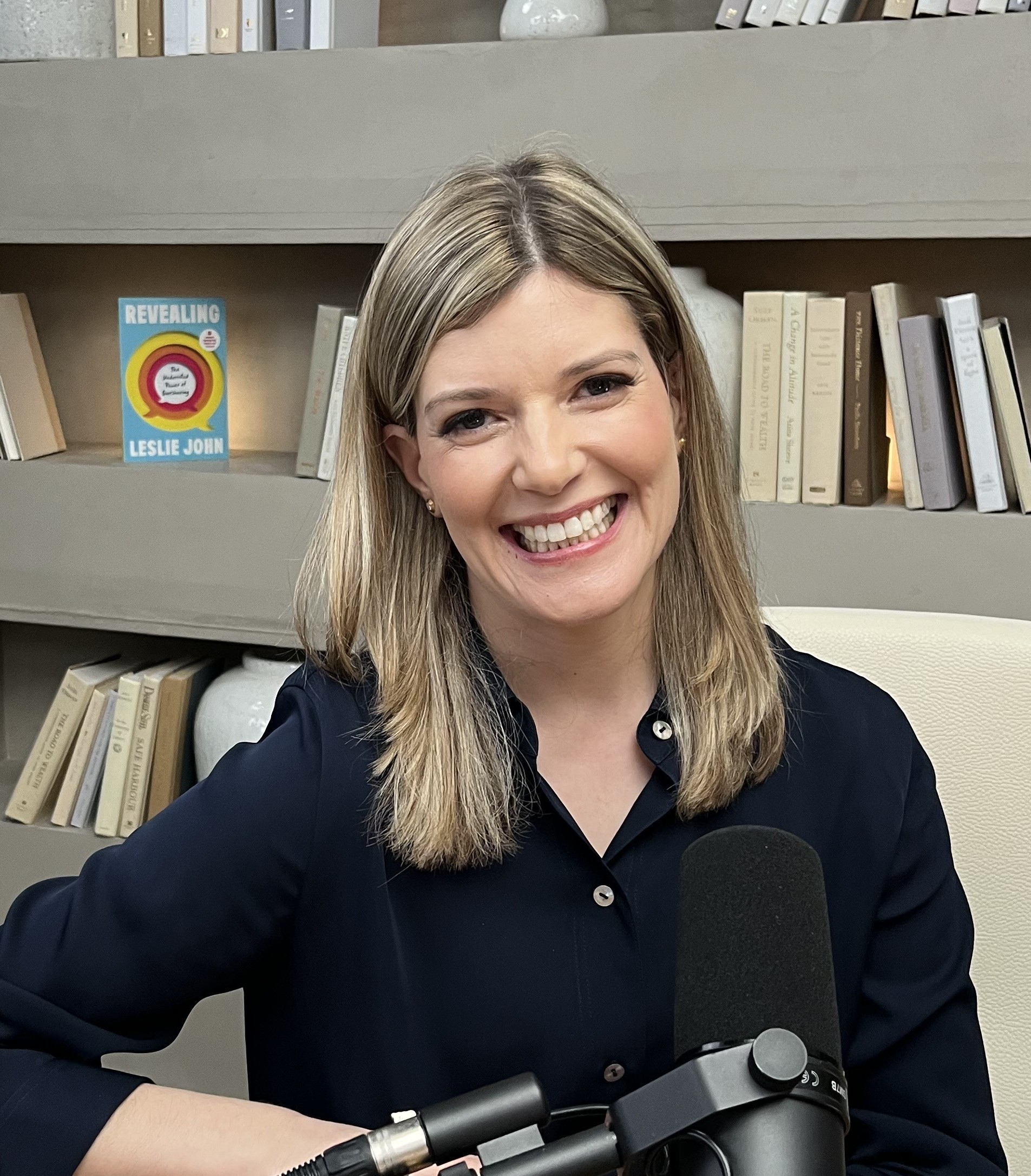
- John during podcast appearance
- Education: Carnegie Mellon University (M.Sc. Ph.D.); University of Waterloo (B.A.)
- Occupations: Professor and Author
- Employer: Harvard Business School
- Scientific career
- Fields: Behavioral economics Behavioral science
- Doctoral advisor: George Loewenstein
- Website: proflesliejohn.com

Leslie K. John is a Canadian and American academic, behavioral scientist, and popular science author of Revealing: The Underrated Power of Oversharing. She is the James E. Burke Professor of Business Administration at Harvard Business School, where she studies how people make decisions.

== Early life and education ==
John was a professionally trained ballet dancer prior to embarking on her academic career. She trained at the National Ballet School of Canada, Royal Winnipeg Ballet School, and John Cranko Ballet School in Germany.

When she retired from ballet, John earned a B.A. with Honors in Psychology & Arts and Business from the University of Waterloo in 2006. She graduated from Carnegie Mellon University with an M.Sc. in Psychology & Behavioral Decision Research and a Ph.D. in Behavioral Decision Research in 2011.

== Career ==
John joined the faculty of Harvard Business School in July 2011 as an assistant professor. She was promoted to associate professor in 2016 and awarded academic tenure and promotion to professor in 2021.

John is a frequent keynote speaker and consultant, working with clients such as Goldman Sachs, JPMorgan Chase, Weight Watchers International, McKinsey & Company, and PepsiCo. Her work has been published and cited in many selective academic journals and popular media sources.

John's work and research has been featured in The Wall Street Journal, Harvard Business Review, Wired Magazine, The New York Times, Financial Times, NPR, The Economist, Bloomberg Businessweek, Business Insider and Los Angeles Times as well as popular media shows including: Hidden Brain, Harvard Business Review IdeaCast Podcast,10% Happier with Dan Harris (journalist), and others.

John's debut book, Revealing: The Underrated Power of Oversharing, was published on February 24, 2026. In advance of publication, Revealing received praise from Arthur C. Brooks, Adam Grant, Katy Milkman, and others while being cited by The Wall Street Journal, Time (magazine), The Independent, The Guardian, making Grant's list of new books for 2026, and the "Must Read Books for February 2026" list from the Next Big Idea Club.

== Research ==
John's research focuses on how people make decisions and the result of those decisions. She studies privacy decision making, examining the factors that influence when individuals choose to share or protect personal information, and how they respond to organizations' and employers' use of their data.

John's research has been published in academic journals including, Journal of Experimental Psychology: Applied, Organizational Behavior and Human Decision Processes, Psychological Science, Journal of Marketing Research, Proceedings of the National Academy of Sciences of the United States of America, Management Science, JAMA Network Open, and many others. She was previously the co-editor of Current Opinion in Psychology (Elsevier): Privacy and Disclosure, Online and in Social Interactions and has sat or is presently on the editorial boards of Journal of Marketing, Journal of Consumer Research, Journal of Marketing Research, and Social Psychological and Personality Science.

== Awards and honors ==
- 2016 Wired Innovation Fellow
- 2017 Marketing Science Institute Young Scholar
- 2018 Michael P. O’Donnell Paper of the Year, American Journal of Health Promotion
- 2018 Finalist for the HBR McKinsey Award – HBR Article – "The Surprising Power of Questions"
- 2023 Marketing Science Institute Scholar

== Books ==
- Revealing: The Underrated Power of Oversharing (Penguin Random House, 2026)
