= Jacqueline Thurston =

American artist

- Born: 1939 (age 86–87); Cincinnati, Ohio US
- Education: Carnegie Mellon University, Stanford University
- Known for: Photography, drawing, writing, poetry
- Awards: Fulbright Scholar, National Endowment for the Arts
- Website: Jacqueline Thurston

Jacqueline Thurston (born 1939) is an American visual artist and writer, based in California. She is most known for evocative photographs that explore the human psyche, the nature of illusion, life and death, and primal forces of nature. Her work also extends to drawings, performance, prose and poetry. Her black and white photographic series of the 1970s and 1980s were identified as early examples of a movement toward "psychological documentary" and noted for their ambiguity, sense of stillness and silence, and nuanced use of tone, texture and light to convey mood. In the 1990s, she began to work in color, frequently pairing photographs with the written word, in talismanic "photo objects," artist books and her book and series, Sacred Deities of Ancient Egypt (2019). These works explored shamanistic connections to nature, the creative process in relation to memory, dream and autobiography, and the psychoanalytic roots of symbol and metaphor.

Jacqueline Thurston, Hathor as Goddess of Love, "Sacred Deities of Ancient Egypt series," Cibachrome print, 2009.

Thurston has received a Fulbright and grants from the National Endowment for the Arts. Her work has been exhibited at the San Francisco Museum of Modern Art, San Jose Museum of Art, Bibliothèque nationale de France, and Bibliotheca Alexandrina, and belongs to the collections of those museums as well as the Los Angeles County Museum of Art and Carnegie Museum of Art, among others. Thurston is based in Palo Alto, California and is professor emerita of art at San Jose State University.

== Early life and career ==
Jacqueline Beverly Thurston was born in Cincinnati, Ohio in 1939 and grew up in rural western Pennsylvania. As a child, she regularly took art lessons at the Carnegie Museum of Art in Pittsburgh and encountered its nature dioramas, an experience she later revisited in a well-recognized photographic series. Thurston majored in painting at Carnegie Mellon University, graduating with a BFA in 1961 after studying with industrial designer and artist Robert Lepper. In 1962 she earned an MA in painting from Stanford University, then taught there briefly before joining the art faculty at San Jose State University in 1965. She co-authored the book Optical Illusions and the Visual Arts with Robert Carraher in 1966, which led her to pursue photography as her primary medium in the late 1960s.

In the first half of her career, Thurston appeared in group shows at the Oakland Museum, George Eastman House, Seattle Art Museum, de Saisset Museum, Bibliothèque nationale de France, and San Francisco Museum of Modern Art. She has had solo exhibitions at Triangle Gallery (1963, 2005; San Francisco), Susan Spiritus Gallery (1976, 1986, 2002; Newport Beach), Montalvo Arts Center (1999), San Jose Museum of Art (2005), Hearst Museum of Anthropology (2019) and Art Museum of the University of Memphis (2021), and appeared in later group shows at Bibliotheca Alexandrina and the Orange County Museum of Art.

== Work and reception ==
=== Black and white photographic series ===
Jacqueline Thurston, Radiation Treatment, "Vital Signs" series, gelatin silver print, 1976.

In the 1970s, Thurston focused on black and white photography. Her poetic "Nocturnal Suite" consisted primarily of outdoor, nighttime scenes: miniature golf courses, filling stations, car washes, underpasses and subterranean corridors, construction sites and solitary figures. San Francisco Chronicle critic Thomas Albright wrote that its stark shadows, dislocations of scale and use of the unnatural glows and radiance of artificial light gave a "modish, haunted ambiguity to commonplace images," achieving "a nuance of tone and texture that does for night something of what Atget did for early dawn."

Critics situated Thurston's subsequent "Vital Signs" series within a newly developing photographic genre—"psychological documentary"—which explored interior experience (of artist and subject), in this case through everyday hospital and clinic situations involving birth, death and survival. They portrayed patients and procedures with a quiet clarity, fragility and directness that writers described as honest and sometimes chilling (e.g., Radiation Treatment, 1976, an image of a patient lying on his stomach with a horror-movie-like mask covering the face). Small in size (some only 4" square), yet striking for their staging, attention to gesture, ordered compositions and lighting, these images were noted by Artweek's Dorothy Burkhart for a "jewel-like quality reminiscent of the Flemish miniaturist Jan van Eyck"; also noted was an aura-like effect that suggested a mystical force beyond the edges of the images. In the series' 1970s showings, reviews identified themes of vulnerability, hope, compassion and a wonder at modern technology's capacity to heal and sustain life. Exhibited at the San Jose Museum of Art three decades later, the series was interpreted as expressing disquiet at the submission of bodies to medical machinery that might seem foreign, even unsympathetic to human suffering.

In her "Circus" (1979) and "Dioramas" (1986) series, Thurston combined photography and written reflections. The "Dioramas" comprised 17 black-and-white photographs taken at major U.S. natural history museums with text that contemplated the polemics of display and representation and beliefs about life, death and immortality, while conveying compassion for humans and animals through their lyricism. In the images, Thurston used lighting, reflection and framing to belie the transparency and authenticity of museum exhibition and expose how the reconstructed "natural" environments function to mask the charged conditions of animal capture and eventual display. According to Artweek's Rebecca Palmer, "in image after image, [a] shifting duality of space exists," suggesting the possibility of both subject (e.g., a mysterious mountain lion, an Arapaho spirit dancer) and viewer occupying different, multiple space and time frames.

Jacqueline Thurston, Song of the Bear, "Cycle of Songs" series, Cibachrome photographic print, letterpress printing on handmade paper and handcrafted wooden box, 1991.

=== Later photography and drawing series ===
In the 1990s Thurston's interest in poetry played an increasing role, leading to collaborative performances sponsored by Stanford's Center for Computer Research in Acoustics and Music and a body of small-scale sculptural objects pairing her own verse with her photographic prints. The "Cycle of Songs" series (Montalvo Art Center, 1999) was a ten-year exploration of the feminine spirit embodied in the natural world. It consisted of "photo-objects" combining color Cibachrome images of carefully lit tableaux and original poems letterpress printed on handmade paper in handcrafted wooden containers that like Russian icons could be ritualistically opened and closed. Song of the Shaman and Song of the Bear focused on the element of earth and explored shamanic women in touch with the primal forces of nature; Song of the Moon featured an arrangement of iridescent seashells on a shiny black background, a graphite sketch and a poem about the moon's changing influence. Reviews compared the simple elegance of the photographs to Shaker furniture and Japanese temples, while noting the enigmatic and mythic quality of the imagery (textual and visual), which was drawn from dreams, memories and the talismanic qualities of the still-life objects.

In her "Passages" series (Triangle Gallery, 2005), Thurston returned to drawings (in pastels, graphite, gesso and powdered pigments) that expressed a connection to the natural world anchored in childhood while recognizing the recent death of one of her brothers. She explored themes similar to those of the "Songs" and "Passages" series in two limited-edition artist books, Shadowland (2016) and Hymn to Hands (2017), which paired her Cibachrome photographs with her poetry and prose.

Thurston's late career has focused on photography and writing examining the mythology and iconography of ancient Egyptian gods and goddesses, resulting in a photographic portfolio and book, both titled, Sacred Deities of Ancient Egypt. The work began with a Fulbright Fellowship to Egypt she received in 2006, during which she traveled alone and began photographing the feminine figures on monuments in the pantheon with a handheld camera, without access to a tripod or a flash. Over subsequent trips, these initial interpretive portraits expanded to include research into and writing about such subjects as the archetypal nature and interrelatedness of the divine feminine and divine masculine, the presence of dualities and paradoxes within single Egyptian deities, and their relationship to the multiplicity of the human personality (e.g., Hathor as Goddess of Love, 2009). Art historian Susan Landauer wrote that this work, "takes us on a personal journey to explore both the meaning—always with an eye toward contemporary relevance—and astonishing beauty of Egyptian art."

== Teaching and writing ==
Thurston's lifelong thematic concerns have inspired her writings, courses and lectures on the role of memories, dreams and autobiographical stories in art, the psychological dimensions of metaphor, and the cosmology of ancient Egypt. After beginning her teaching career at Stanford University, she taught for over forty years in the School of Art and Design at San Jose State University (SJSU) and has been professor emerita since 2006. She also taught in the psychology department at Sonoma State University and the global studies department at SJSU, and lectured at the C. G. Jung Institute in San Francisco, other Jungian institutes, and the American Research Center in Egypt. In 2007 and 2008, she was a member of the faculty of Soliya Connect, an international web-based program designed to increase understanding among university students in the U.S., Europe, and the Middle East.

Thurston's two trade books are: Optical Illusions and the Visual Arts (1966, with Robert Carraher), a creative guide that collected wide-ranging examples of visual illusions from painting, illustration, photography and graphic design; and Sacred Deities of Ancient Egypt (2019). The latter book has inspired numerous lectures and an exhibition that Thurston co-curated with Egyptologist Lorelei H. Corcoran, "Writing in Three Dimensions: Myth and Metaphor in Ancient Egypt" (Art Museum of the University of Memphis, 2021), which featured photographs and antiquities from the museum's collection.

== Recognition ==
Thurston's work belongs to the public collections of the Bainbridge Island Museum of Art, Bibliotheca Alexandrina, Bibliothèque nationale de France, Buffalo AKG Art Museum, Carnegie Museum of Art, Center for Creative Photography (Tucson), George Eastman Museum, Library of Congress, Los Angeles County Museum of Art, Orange County Museum of Art, San Francisco Museum of Modern Art, and San Jose Museum of Art, as well as several university museums. She has received grants from the National Endowment for the Arts (1976, 1977) and was a Fulbright Scholar to Egypt in 2006.
