= Steven Song =

Korean-American architect

Steven Phillip Song is a Korean-American architect and real estate investor. Song, as a founding principal of the design firm SCAAA, first came to recognition through collaborations with his mentors, the architects and theoreticians Robert Venturi and Denise Scott Brown. Song is also the CEO of Axle Companies, a family office that invests in real estate and food companies. Song is on the board of directors of the Hammer Museum, the Executive Council of the Clinton Foundation Health Access Initiative, and the Board of Trustees of SCI-Arc (Southern California Institute of Architecture). In 2025, Song founded the AI real estate platform Diald AI.

== Education ==
Song is a graduate of Carnegie Mellon University, the School of Architecture. He then completed his Master of Architecture degree from the University of Pennsylvania.

== Theoretical Writings ==
In 2007, Song wrote Shifting Paradigms: Renovating the Decorated Shed, together with Sun-Young Park. The article explores and furthers ideas discussed in Venturi and Scott Brown's latest book, Architecture as Signs and Systems: For a Mannerist Time published by Harvard University Press.

In July 2007, the article was presented at the 5th International Conference on New Directions in the Humanities held at The American University of Paris. The article, since then, has been revised and appeared at international venues including an American Architectural forum Archinect, and a South-Korean Architectural magazine SPACE.

Song supervised the translation and publication of "Architecture as Signs and Systems: For a Mannerist Time" in South Korea.

In January 2010, an international group of architects, artists, writers, scholars and students convened at Yale University to re-evaluate Venturi and Scott Brown's theories and investigate their cross-disciplinary significance and potential from both historical and contemporary perspectives. The Architecture after Las Vegas symposium revolved around themes and provocations inherent in "Learning from Las Vegas", a text written by the pair that continues to inspire and provoke artists, planners, designers, and architects more than forty years after its first publication.

Following the symposium, Song published Learning from ‘Learning-From. The review essay recapitulates some of the discussions that happened during and after the symposium, focusing particularly on topics and themes that call for further inquiry.

Song wrote Architecture in the Givenness: Toward the Difficult Whole Again in 2011. The article was featured in two parts by Archinect.

== Recognition as an architect ==
Venturi and Scott Brown wrote in the introduction of the article in SPACE magazine, "In the 1960s and '70s we recommended changes to keep the Modern architecture we love responsive to its times. Forty years later we are happy to read this author's reappraisal of what we said. Steven Song puts aside the debris of misunderstanding that accompanied the first reception of our ideas and sets them back along the tracks we had intended. Then he adapts and expands our thesis to meet conditions that young architects in practice today will face. In doing so, he gives us hope that the newest generation of architects, as they again reformulate Modernism, will maintain and strengthen its good base—what a gift to two old architects!"

In April, 2009, at the end of their lecture at the Architectural Association in London, Venturi and Scott Brown introduced Song as one of the architects of the new generation who are carrying their ideas forward. Scott Brown listed Song's article in her latest book "Having Words".

Song was quoted in "Re-imagining outdoor learning spaces: Primary capital, co-design and educational transformation," a proposal written by BECTA (the British Educational and Communications Technology Agency) and Futurelab. as part of a research and development program, which focuses on the use and utility of space for play and learning for children.

Herald Business Korea featured three articles on Song and his apprenticeship with Venturi and Scott Brown in July, 2009.

In their interview with Museo Magazine in 2010, Scott Brown and Venturi said, ”...and Steven Song, whose Shifting Paradigms: Renovating the Decorated Shed takes our ideas into global urbanism and new communication technologies.”

== Selected bibliography ==
- Song, Steven Phillip, “Shifting Paradigms: Renovating the Decorated Shed,” SPACE, No.

496, March 2009, pp. 117–129 (modified from article previously published online w/ same title at Archinect, May 15, 2008)

- Hartman, Pat, "Venturi, Scott Brown and the Future of Architecture," Architectural Graphics Standards, June 18, 2008;
- Lee, Y.R., “Architect of the New Generation, Steven Song, to create a think tank of

Architecture,” Herald Business, July 14, 2009; (http://www.heraldbiz.com/SITE/data/html_dir/2009/07/14/200907140668.asp)

- Lee, Y.R., “Architecture without consideration for people is a building without life,” Herald

Business, July 14, 2009; (http://www.heraldbiz.com/SITE/data/html_dir/2009/07/14/200907140634.asp)
