= Ronald D. Macfarlane =

American Academic

- Born: February 21, 1933; Buffalo, New York
- Education: B.A. 1954 University at Buffalo; M.S. 1957 Carnegie-Mellon University; Ph.D. 1959 Carnegie-Mellon University
- Known for: Mass Spectrometry
- Awards: Guggenheim Fellow; Distinguished Contribution in Mass Spectrometry Award; Distinguished Achievement in Research Award; ACS Nuclear Chemistry Award
- Scientific career
- Fields: Chemist
- Workplaces: Texas A&M University

Ronald D. Macfarlane (born February 21, 1933, Buffalo, New York) is distinguished professor of Chemistry at Texas A&M University. In 1991, he received the Inaugural Award of the American Society for Mass Spectrometry's Distinguished Achievement Award.

== Early life and education ==
- 1954 University at Buffalo, New York - B.A. Chemistry
- 1957 Carnegie-Mellon University, Pennsylvania - M.S. Chemistry
- 1959 Carnegie-Mellon University, Pennsylvania - Ph.D. Chemistry

== Research interests ==
- Separations Methods for Medical Diagnosis
- Ultra-Sensitive Mass Spectrometry
- Is researching the new methods of Conceptual Learning

== Awards ==
- Guggenheim Fellowship, 1968
- Distinguished Achievement in Research Award
- ACS Nuclear Chemistry Award
- 1990 ASMS Distinguished Contribution in Mass Spectrometry Award
