= Millicent Sullivan =

American chemist

- Education: Princeton University (B.S.); Carnegie Mellon University (Ph.D.)
- Known for: Targeted drug delivery, polymeric biomaterials
- Awards: Fellow of the American Institute for Medical and Biological Engineering (2017); Fulbright Program Fellowship (2020); NSF CAREER Award
- Scientific career
- Fields: Chemical engineering, Biomolecular engineering
- Workplaces: University of Delaware
- Academic advisors: Emily Helene Sage (postdoctoral)

Millicent Sullivan is an American chemical engineer and the Alvin B. & Julie O. Stiles Professor of Chemical & Biomolecular Engineering and department chair at the University of Delaware. She is a Fellow of the American Institute for Medical and Biological Engineering. Her research considers the development of polymeric materials for targeted drug delivery and the mechanisms that underpin cell – drug interactions.

== Early life and education ==
Sullivan completed her undergraduate studies at Princeton University. She moved to Carnegie Mellon University for her graduate research, where she focussed on chemical engineering. Sullivan was a Ruth L. Kirschstein postdoctoral fellow at the Benaroya Research Institute. At Benaroya Sullivan worked alongside the biochemist Emily Helene Sage.

== Research and career ==
In 2006 Sullivan joined the University of Delaware. Sullivan is interested in how therapeutics, including nucleic acid treatments and conventional pharmaceuticals, interact with abnormally behaving cells. Targeted drug release offers the potential to improve the prognosis of various medical conditions. At the University of Delaware she was awarded an National Science Foundation CAREER Award that allowed her to study the interaction of cells with gene delivery systems. She makes use polymer-base biomaterials to package DNA-based therapeutics.

She was selected to attend the National Academy of Engineering Frontiers Symposium in 2010 and was the first woman to be the chair of the Department of Chemical and Biomolecular Engineering at University of Delaware. Alongside drug delivery, Sullivan looks to better understand the process of wound healing. She makes use of advanced gene therapies to help people with chronic, non-healing conditions. She has published over 70 scholarly articles that have accrued over 2,000 citations.

== Awards and honours ==
- 2011: Outstanding Junior Faculty
- 2013: Georgia Tech Frontiers in Bioengineering Young Investigator
- 2017: Elected Fellow of the American Institute for Medical and Biological Engineering
- 2020: Fulbright Program Fellowship

== Select publications ==
- Kelley, Elizabeth G.; Albert, Julie N. L.; Sullivan, Millicent O.; Epps, III, Thomas H. (2013). "Stimuli-responsive copolymer solution and surface assemblies for biomedical applications". Chemical Society Reviews. 42 (17): 7057–7071. doi:10.1039/c3cs35512h. ISSN 0306-0012. PMC 3703495. PMID 23403471.
- Walsh, J. W.; Hoffstad, O. J.; Sullivan, M. O.; Margolis, D. J. (2016-01-10). "Association of diabetic foot ulcer and death in a population-based cohort from the United Kingdom". Diabetic Medicine. 33 (11): 1493–1498. doi:10.1111/dme.13054. ISSN 0742-3071. PMID 26666583.
- Ow Sullivan, M M; Green, J J; Przybycien, T M (2003-09-22). "Development of a novel gene delivery scaffold utilizing colloidal gold–polyethylenimine conjugates for DNA condensation". Gene Therapy. 10 (22): 1882–1890. doi:10.1038/sj.gt.3302083. ISSN 0969-7128. PMID 14502217.

== Personal life ==
Sullivan plays the violin.
