= Brian Olsavsky =

American business executive

- Education: Pennsylvania State University (BS); Carnegie Mellon University (MBA)
- Occupation: Business executive
- Years active: 1989–present
- Employer: Amazon (2002–present)
- Title: Chief financial officer of Amazon
- Board member of: Carnegie Mellon University
- Spouse: Susan Olsavsky
- Children: 3

Brian T. Olsavsky is an American business executive who has served as chief financial officer (CFO) and Senior Vice President of Amazon since 2015.

== Early life and education ==
Olsavsky grew up in Hershey, Pennsylvania, and is the youngest of four, along with his twin. His father was an engineer. He attended Hershey High School, where he served as senior class president. He earned a Bachelor of Science degree in mechanical engineering from Pennsylvania State University in 1985. After graduation, he worked for two years as a production supervisor at Glad plastics manufacturing plant in Connecticut operated by Union Carbide. He later earned a Master of Business Administration in finance from Carnegie Mellon University's Tepper School of Business in 1989.

== Career ==
Olsavsky began his corporate finance career in 1989 at BFGoodrich in Akron, Ohio, working under the company's treasurer. He spent five years there. Later, he joined Fisher Scientific International, which was expanding through acquisitions. Based initially in New Jersey and later in Pittsburgh, he held finance and senior logistics management roles. He remained at Fisher Scientific for seven years.

In April 2002, Olsavsky joined Amazon as Vice President of Finance. He led the finance team for Worldwide Operations, overseeing financial planning for fulfillment and distribution. From 2007 to 2010, he served as Vice President of Finance for Amazon's North America retail division and worked on mergers and acquisitions.

In June 2015, Olsavsky was appointed CFO for Amazon's Global Consumer Business, succeeding Thomas Szkutak. At the same time, he assumed the role of Senior Vice President. He oversees the finances of its international retail, marketplace, and fulfillment operations. His role has additionally expanded to focus on investments of new AI technology.

During his tenure, Amazon has completed multiple acquisitions, including Whole Foods Market, Souq, PillPack, Ring, Zoox, and MGM Studios.

== Awards and affiliations ==
Olsavsky joined the Board of Trustees of Carnegie Mellon University in 2024. He was additionally on the Advisory Council of Plymouth Housing through 2023.

The Puget Sound Business Journal named him as one of 16 financial executives recognized as "CFO of the Year" in 2025.

== Personal life ==
Olsavsky is married to Susan, a Pittsburgh native who he met at Penn State, and they have three children.
