= Madhavi Vuppalapati =

Madhavi Vuppalapati (born 23 March 1972) is founder, CEO, and Chairperson of Prithvi Information Solutions (“Prithvi”). She is married and has one child and lives in Seattle, Washington. A graduate of Carnegie Mellon University in Pittsburgh, Madhavi holds a master's degree in Computational Mechanics. Madhavi founded the telecom and IT services multinational Prithvi in 1998, and together with her brother Satish Vuppalapati, took the company public in India 7 years later. She is the only female CEO amongst the top 50 Indian IT and telecom services companies.

== Early life and education ==
Born in Chirala, Andhra Pradesh, India to Ramarao Vuppalapati, an industrialist and professor of physics, and Murthy Devi, a homemaker, Madhavi is the second of 3 children. She attended St. Anthony's High School, where she was the top student in her class. She went on to study computer science at Osmania University in Hyderabad, where she graduated in 1993 with a Bachelor of Engineering degree. Madhavi went on to attend Carnegie Mellon University, graduating in 1995 with a master's degree in Computational Mathematics.

== Career ==
Madhavi joined Alcoa as a contract design engineer shortly after graduating, and began working on various assignments in the Pittsburgh area. After being laid off three times in three years due to project cancellations and a sketchy economy, a time she attributes to being the turning point in her career, Madhavi decided to go into business for herself. She founded Prithvi Information Solutions in 1998, and together with several friends from CMU oriented the company toward providing software R&D and data analytics services. Initially to float the business, Prithvi engaged in consulting work which it further expanded to software and IT services provided from the Prithvi's India facility. The company grew quickly and went public in 2005 on revenues of $60 M.
In 2006 Madhavi returned to her alma mater to help Turing Award winner Dr. Raj Reddy establish the Global Innovation Center in conjunction with Carnegie Mellon University in Pittsburgh.

== Entrepreneurship ==
As an entrepreneur herself, Madhavi supports entrepreneurship through her involvement with The Indus Entrepreneurs (TIE) and personal mentoring of five craft-based microbusinesses (see Philanthropy and Charitable Works below). She served on the Boards of TIE Pittsburgh from 2006 to 2008, and TIE Seattle from 2010.

== Recognition ==
- Business Today awarded Madhavi as one of "The 10 rising stars to represent the epitome of today’s women, for whom nothing is impossible".
- Madhavi was selected by the Indian School of Business to meet with U.S. President George W. Bush as part of a young entrepreneurs summit.
- In 2009, Madhavi was recognized by the Federation of Andhra Pradesh Chambers of Commerce and Industry (FAPCCI) by awarding her the Best Woman CEO.

== Controversy ==
On September 6, 2013, United States District Court Western District of Washington at Seattle entered a judgment against Prithvi Solutions Inc. ordering them to pay over $17 million to Kyko Global Inc. in a lawsuit filed by the latter. To recover the penalty, Madhavi Vuppalapati received court's notice for sale of personal property on February 12, 2014. The court directed the Sheriff to auction and sell her 2006 Lexus RX4005D, along with her jewelry and miscellaneous household items. An arrest warrant was issued against Vuppalapati on 16th Oct 2014 by The King County Court, Washington.

On September 10, 2013, Prithvi Catalytic, a subsidiary of Prithvi Solutions Inc., voluntarily filed for Chapter 11 Bankruptcy after missing multiple payroll deadlines for contract and internal employees, primarily due to the judgement favoring Kyko Global Inc. As a part of the bankruptcy, the Court appointed, with Kyko's consent, a chief restructuring officer to oversee PCI's operations. This officer was the controller to PCI, David Amorose, who was tasked with leading reorganization efforts to maintain existing business with key customers, even after re-branding to "Abilius, Inc." However, the accusations of fraud against Madhavi Vuppalapati and damaged reputation of PCI among its clients resulted in significant loss of revenue. Ultimately, Kyko and debtors attempted a suit to recoup losses from clients, competitors, and former PCI executives. In 2022 all the parties have settled the prolonged litigation
