= Kimberly W. Anderson =

American chemist

Kimberly W. Anderson is an American chemist. She is the Gill Eminent Professor of Chemical Engineering and Associate Dean for Administration and Academic Affairs in the College of Engineering at the University of Kentucky.

== Education and career ==
Anderson studied chemical engineering at Youngstown State University and received her PhD in chemical engineering and bioengineering from Carnegie Mellon University. She joined the University of Kentucky in 1987 as an assistant professor in the Department of Chemical Engineering and faculty associate in the Center of Membrane Sciences. She was the department's director of graduate studies (1993–1996) and later served in the Department of Biomedical Engineering. She was associate dean for administration and academic affairs in the College of Engineering from 1996–1999.

== Awards and honors ==
- 2015 – Inducted in the American Institute for Medical and Biological Engineering
- 1991 – Excellence Award in Undergraduate Education, University of Kentucky

== Selected publications ==
- Brugge, Joan S.; Erikson, R. L. (1977). "Identification of a transformation-specific antigen induced by an avian sarcoma virus". Nature. 269 (5626). Springer Science and Business Media LLC: 346–348. Bibcode:1977Natur.269..346B. doi:10.1038/269346a0. ISSN 0028-0836. PMID 198667. S2CID 4174483.
- Brugge, Joan S.; Erikson, E.; Erikson, R.L. (1981). "The specific interaction of the Rous sarcoma virus transforming protein, pp60src, with two cellular proteins". Cell. 25 (2). Elsevier BV: 363–372. doi:10.1016/0092-8674(81)90055-6. ISSN 0092-8674. PMID 6269742. S2CID 10076530.
- Bolen, Joseph B.; Thiele, Carol J.; Israel, Mark A.; Yonemoto, Wes; Lipsich, Leah A.; Brugge, Joan S. (1984). "Enhancement of cellular src gene product associated tyrosyl kinase activity following polyoma virus infection and transformation". Cell. 38 (3). Elsevier BV: 767–777. doi:10.1016/0092-8674(84)90272-1. ISSN 0092-8674. PMID 6091900. S2CID 25578406.
- Thomas, Sheila M.; DeMarco, Michael; D'Arcangelo, Gabriella; Halegoua, Simon; Brugge, Joan S. (1992). "Ras is essential for nerve growth factor- and phorbol ester-induced tyrosine phosphorylation of MAP kinases". Cell. 68 (6). Elsevier BV: 1031–1040. doi:10.1016/0092-8674(92)90075-n. ISSN 0092-8674. PMID 1312392. S2CID 14656745.
- Golden, A; Brugge, J S (1989). "Thrombin treatment induces rapid changes in tyrosine phosphorylation in platelets". Proceedings of the National Academy of Sciences. 86 (3): 901–905. Bibcode:1989PNAS...86..901G. doi:10.1073/pnas.86.3.901. ISSN 0027-8424. PMC 286586. PMID 2464830.
- Debnath, Jayanta; Mills, Kenna R.; Collins, Nicole L.; Reginato, Mauricio J.; Muthuswamy, Senthil K.; Brugge, Joan S. (2002). "The Role of Apoptosis in Creating and Maintaining Luminal Space within Normal and Oncogene-Expressing Mammary Acini". Cell. 111 (1). Elsevier BV: 29–40. doi:10.1016/s0092-8674(02)01001-2. ISSN 0092-8674. PMID 12372298. S2CID 51808881.
- Schafer, Zachary T.; Grassian, Alexandra R.; Song, Loling; Jiang, Zhenyang; Gerhart-Hines, Zachary; Irie, Hanna Y.; Gao, Sizhen; Puigserver, Pere; Brugge, Joan S. (19 August 2009). "Antioxidant and oncogene rescue of metabolic defects caused by loss of matrix attachment". Nature. 461 (7260). Springer Science and Business Media LLC: 109–113. Bibcode:2009Natur.461..109S. doi:10.1038/nature08268. ISSN 0028-0836. PMC 2931797. PMID 19693011.
- Muranen, Taru; Selfors, Laura M.; Worster, Devin T.; Iwanicki, Marcin P.; Song, Loling; Morales, Fabiana C.; Gao, Sizhen; Mills, Gordon B.; Brugge, Joan S. (2012). "Inhibition of PI3K/mTOR Leads to Adaptive Resistance in Matrix-Attached Cancer Cells". Cancer Cell. 21 (2). Elsevier BV: 227–239. doi:10.1016/j.ccr.2011.12.024. ISSN 1535-6108. PMC 3297962. PMID 22340595.
