= Lorenz Biegler =

American chemical engineer

- Education: PhD. (Chemical Engineering 1981), MS. (1979), BS. (1977)
- Alma mater: University of Wisconsin, Illinois Institute of Technology
- Known for: IPOPT, Systematic methods for chemical process design, Nonlinear programming: concepts, algorithms, and applications to chemical processes
- Awards: Humboldt Prize, INFORMS Computing Society Prize, Presidential Young Investigator Award
- Scientific career
- Fields: Optimization, Chemical engineering
- Workplaces: Carnegie Mellon University
- Doctoral advisor: Dick Hughes

Lorenz Theodor Biegler is the professor of Covestro University Professor, in the Chemical Engineering department at Carnegie Mellon University. He was previously the department head of Chemical Engineering at Carnegie Mellon from 2013 to 2018. His research interests lie in optimization of differential and algebraic systems, computer aided process engineering (CAPE), reactor network synthesis, and algorithms for constrained, nonlinear process control. He has written two widely used textbooks, and over 400 scientific publications.

== Work ==
In 1985 Biegler was awarded the Presidential Young Investigator Award, which lead to him starting the Center for Advanced Process Decision-Making at Carnegie Mellon University, along with Ignacio Grossmann and Art Westerberg. Biegler has played a major role in the computer aided process engineering, has received various awards including the Computing in Chemical Engineering Award from the American Institute of Chemical Engineers, an honorary doctorate from Technische Universität Berlin, the INFORMS Computing Society Prize for developing IPOPT, an open source program for large-scale nonlinear optimization.

Biegler was elected a member of the National Academy of Engineering in 2013 for contributing to large-scale nonlinear optimization theory and algorithms for application to process optimization, design and control.
