= Godspell (1971 Off-Broadway Cast) =

Cast recording by The Cast of Godspell (1971 Off-Broadway)
- Released: July 1971
- Recorded: 1971
- Genre: Musical theatre
- Label: Bell Records; BELL 1102; Arista/BMG Records; 07822-14001 (reissued 1974)
- Producer: Stephen Schwartz

Professional ratings
Review scores
Source	Rating
AllMusic	4/5 stars

Godspell (1971 Off-Broadway Cast) is the original cast recording of the Cherry Lane Theatre production of Godspell. It produced a radio hit in the summer of 1972 with "Day By Day" with Robin Lamont on the lead vocal. The image of the face on the album cover was designed by David Byrd.

== Track listing ==
Music and new lyrics by Stephen Schwartz except as indicated.

1. "Prepare Ye the Way of the Lord" – 2:03
2. "Save the People" – 3:24
3. "Day by Day" – 3:16
4. "Learn Your Lessons Well" – 1:25
5. "Bless the Lord" – 3:01
6. "All for the Best" – 2:31
7. "All Good Gifts" – 3:33
8. "Light of the World" – 2:59
9. "Turn Back, O Man" – 4:20
10. "Alas for You" – 2:01
11. "By My Side" (lyric by Jay Hamburger / music by Peggy Gordon) – 2:42
12. "We Beseech Thee" – 3:37
13. "On the Willows" – 3:07
14. "Finale" – 5:40
15. "Day By Day (Reprise)" – 1:56

== Cast ==
- Lamar Alford – piano, vocals
- Peggy Gordon – guitar, vocals
- David Haskell – shofar, vocals
- Joanne Jonas – vocals
- Robin Lamont – vocals
- Sonia Manzano – vocals
- Gilmer McCormick – guitar, vocals
- Jeffrey Mylett – guitar, concertina, recorder, vocals
- Stephen Nathan – ukulele, vocals
- Herb Braha – vocals

Five members of the 1971 Off-Broadway cast — David Haskell, Joanne Jonas, Robin Lamont, Gilmer McCormick, and Jeffrey Mylett — recreated their roles in the 1973 film version of Godspell and performed in the film's accompanying soundtrack album.

== Band ==
- Steve Reinhardt – keyboards
- Jesse Cutler – acoustic and lead guitar, bass
- Richard LaBonte – rhythm guitar, bass
- Ricky Shutter – drums, percussion

== Musical production personnel ==
- David Byrd – design
- Stephen Schwartz – arranger, producer, musical director
- Charles Haid – associate producer
- John-Michael Tebelak – director, concept
- Beverly Weinstein – art direction

== Recording personnel ==
- Elvin Campbell – audio engineer
- Bill Inglot – remastering
- Ken Perry – remastering

== Charts ==
Chart (1971/72)	Position
Australia (Kent Music Report)	30
United States (Billboard)	34

== Certifications ==
Organization	Level	Date
RIAA – U.S.	Gold	December 12, 1972
