= Greatest Hits (Colleen Hewett album) =

Greatest hits album by Colleen Hewett
- Released: May 1974
- Recorded: 1971–1973
- Label: Festival Records

Colleen Hewett chronology
Colleen Hewett (1972)	Greatest Hits (1974)	M'Lady (1974)

Greatest Hits is the first greatest hits album by Australian recording artist Colleen Hewett. The album was released in May 1974 by Festival Records.

== Background ==
In 1971, Hewett was signed to Festival Records and released a number of successful singles and a self titled debut album in 1972, which peaked at number 28 on the Australian charts. Hewett also starring role in the stage production of Godspell, which opened at the Playbox Theatre in Melbourne in November 1971 and won the TV Week's Queen of Pop in 1972 and 1973. In January 1974, it was announced Hewett had signed with Atlantic Records, as a result, Festival Records issued a 'greatest hits', despite Hewett having only released one album to date.

== Track listing ==
Vinyl/Cassette

Side A

1. "Day by Day"
2. "Superstar"
3. "Waltzing Matilda"
4. "Can't Sit Down"
5. "By My Side"
6. "I'll Be Seeing You"

Side B

1. "Wish to Wish"
2. "Carry That Weight"
3. "Sit Yourself Down"
4. "More Today Than Yesterday"
5. "Danny Boy"
6. "Day by Day" (Godspell version)
