= Calumet High School (Chicago) =

Calumet High School (Perspectives)
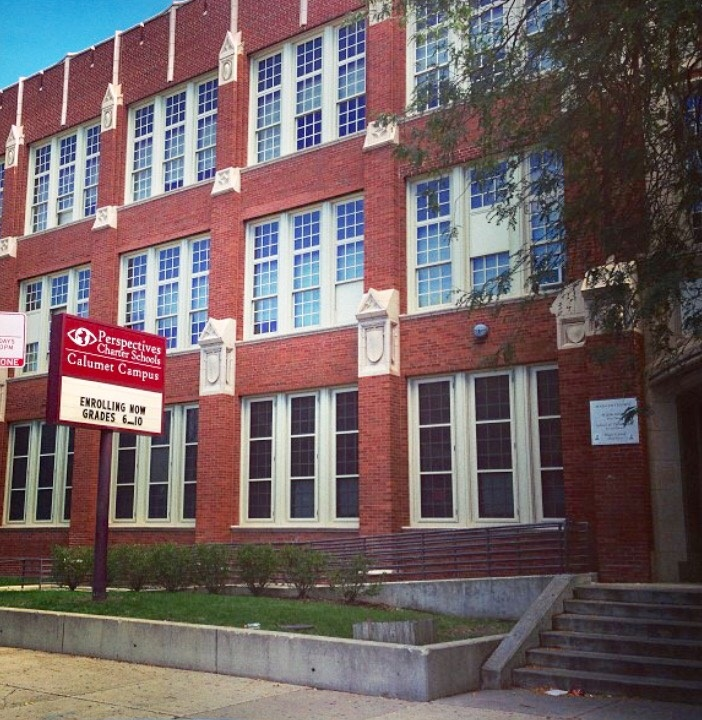
- Main entrance, 2016.

Location
- 8131 S. May Street; Chicago, Illinois 60620; United States
- 41.7459°N 87.6518°W

Information
- School type: Public; Secondary; Charter
- Opened: 1900; 2006 (Leadership); 2007 (Technology)
- Status: Vacant
- Closed: June 2020
- School district: Chicago Public Schools
- CEEB code: 140708 (Leadership); 140944 (Technology)
- Principal: Sarah Severson (Leadership); Erin Powell (Technology)
- Grades: 6–12(Leadership); 9–12 (Technology)
- Gender: Coed
- Enrollment: 487 (Leadership; 2016–17); 372 (Technology; 2016–17)
- Campus type: Urban
- Colors: Maroon; Columbia Blue; White
- Song: "Calumet we're ever loyal to our own Maroon and Blue."
- Athletics conference: Chicago Public League
- Team name: Warriors
- Yearbook: Temulac
- Website: perspectivescs.org pcsedu.org

Calumet High School–Perspectives was a public four-year charter high school and middle school located in the Auburn Gresham neighborhood on the south side of Chicago, Illinois, United States. Opening as Calumet Township High School in 1889, it became a Chicago Public School in 1900 and closed in 2006. From 2006 until 2020, the building was used by two charter schools under Perspective Charter Schools.

== History ==
The school opened as Calumet Township High School in 1889. The school operated at first in a former elementary school on the city's east side, but the Chicago Board of Education eventually decided that a new building needed to be built to house the school. The new school building, at 81st and May Streets, was constructed during January 1925 and completed in 1926. It opened for students for the 1926–27 school year. The school closed after the 2005–2006 academic year due to poor performance and low enrollment. As a part of the Chicago Public Schools Renaissance 2010 program, the Calumet High School building was home to two charter schools: Calumet – Perspectives Leadership Academy, which was located on the third floor, and Calumet – Perspectives High School of Technology, which was located on the second floor.

=== Closure ===
At the end of the 2019–2020 school year, both schools closed at the location.

== Other information ==
Before its 2006 closure, the school was named Calumet Career Prep Academy High School. The school was used as the filming location of the 1999 drama film Light It Up.

== Athletics ==
Calumet competes in the Chicago Public League (CPL) and is a member of the Illinois High School Association (IHSA). The school sport teams are nicknamed The Warriors (formerly Indians). The boys' basketball team were regional champions in 2012–13.

== Notable alumni (1900–2006) ==
- Chaka Khan (attended), – Grammy Award-winning R&B singer.
- James Young (Class of 1968), – Musician, guitarist and songwriter for the rock band Styx.
- Kirby Puckett (Class of 1978), – Baseball player, Major League Baseball Hall-of-Fame outfielder.
- Monique D. Davis (Class of 1955), – Politician, Democratic member of the Illinois House of Representatives.
- Marsha Warfield (Class of 1971), – actress, comedian, talk show host (Night Court, The Marsha Warfield Show).
- Jamie Foster Brown (Class of 1964), – magazine publisher.
- Stella Foster (Class of 1963), – Journalist, columnist for Chicago Sun-Times.
- Georgie Anne Geyer (Class of 1952), – renowned newspaper journalist and columnist.
- Tony Hinkle (Class of 1917), – basketball coach, University of Chicago and Butler University.
- Merrell Jackson, (Class of 1971) – actor best known for "Godspell".
- Martin Joyce – United States Air Force.
- Tommy Sands (attended), – actor and teen idol hitmaker, notably with "Teen-Age Crush" in 1957.
- Earl Eby (attended), – Athlete, participated in the 1920 Olympic Games, taking second for the USA in the 800 meters, and finishing fourth as a part of the 1600 relay.
- Richard Trentlage (Class of 1947), – Musician, composer of the "Oscar Mayer Weiner Jingle", "McDonald's is your kind of place!", "Buckle up for safety, buckle up!" and many other mindsticking, advertising ditties.
