= Tsu =

Tsu or TSU may refer to:

== People ==
- Tsu (surname) (Chinese: 祖), romanized Zu in Mandarin pinyin
- Andrew Tsu (朱友渔; 1885–1986), Chinese Anglican bishop
- Irene Tsu (born 1944), Chinese American actress
- Raphael Tsu (born 1931), Chinese American physicist
- Susan Tsu, American costume designer

=== Characters ===
- Tsuyu Asui, from My Hero Academia

== Places ==
- Tin Shui stop, a Light Rail stop in Hong Kong
- Tsu, Mie, a city in Japan
- Tsu Domain, a Japanese domain of the Edo period
- Tsu Station, in Tsu, Mie Prefecture, Japan

== Universities ==
=== Georgia ===
- Tbilisi State University

=== Philippines ===
- Tarlac State University

=== Russia ===
- Tambov State University
- Tomsk State University
- Tula State University

=== Taiwan ===
- Taiwan Shoufu University

=== Turkmenistan ===
- Turkmen State University, in Ashgabat

=== United States ===
- Tarleton State University, in Stephenville, Texas
- Tennessee State University, in Nashville, Tennessee
- Texas Southern University, in Houston, Texas
- Texas State University, in San Marcos, Texas
- Trinity Southwest University, in Albuquerque, New Mexico
- Tri-State University, now Trine University, in Angola, Indiana
- Truman State University, in Kirksville, Missouri

== Other uses ==
- Tsū, a Japanese aesthetic ideal
- Tsu (kana), つ or ツ, one of the syllables of the Japanese hiragana and katakana syllabaries
- Tsū (social network), a social networking platform now known as display!
- The Sunshine Underground, an English indie rock band
- Taiwan Solidarity Union, a political party in Taiwan
- Toy Soldiers Unite, an online community and artistic network
- Trade Services Utility, a banking initiative
- Tribal Students Union, a student organisation in Tripura, India
- Truly Strong Universities, a ranking of Japanese universities
- Tsou language, an Austronesian language of Taiwan
- "TSU" (song), by Drake from his 2021 album Certified Lover Boy
