= Colleen Hewett (album) =

Studio album by Colleen Hewett
- Released: October 1972
- Recorded: Armstrong Studios
- Label: Festival Records
- Producer: Johnny Young

Colleen Hewett chronology
Colleen Hewett (1972)	Greatest Hits (1974)

Singles from Colleen Hewett
- 1. "Superstar" / "More Today Than Yesterday" Released: June 1971; 2. "Day By Day" / "By My Side" Released: November 1971; 3. "Carry That Weight" / "Danny Boy" Released: July 1972; 4. "Waltzing Matilda" / "Mother" Released: 1973; 5. "A Wish to Wish" / "I've Got Love" Released: 1973

Colleen Hewett is the debut studio album by Australian recording artist Colleen Hewett. The album was released in October 1972 by Festival Records

== Background ==
In 1967 Hewett joined a vocal trio called the Creations with whom she toured Australia. In 1970 she embarked on a solo career under the management of Danny Finley who was later to become her husband. Her big break came later in the year when she won the Bandstand 1970 Best Female Newcomer of the Year award. She was signed to Festival Records and released Joe Cocker's "Superstar" as her debut single as suggested by Johnny Young. Hewett scored a starring role in the stage production of Godspell, which opened at the Playbox Theatre in Melbourne in November 1971. Colleen recorded and released "Day by Day" from Godspell as her second single. The song sold over 50,000 copies and was certified gold. In between her theatre commitments, Hewett recorded her debut album. It was ultimately released in October 1972. By the end of 1972, Hewett won the TV Week's Queen of Pop, and Go-Set's Best Female singer.

== Track listing ==
Vinyl/ Cassette (SFL 934633)

Side A

1. "Day by Day" (Stephen Schwartz)
2. "Mother" (John Lennon)
3. "I've Got Love"
4. "Don't Play That Song (You Lied)"
5. "Danny Boy" (Fred Weatherly)
6. "Carry That Weight" (Lennon-McCartney)

Side B

1. "Superstar"
2. "Help"
3. "Stay With Me Baby" (Jerry Ragavoy, George David Weiss)
4. "Reverend Lee"
5. "So Long Ago"
6. "I'll Be Seeing You"

== Charts ==
Chart (1972)	Peak position
Australian (Go-Set Chart)	28
