= Ka-Boom! (off-Broadway musical) =

Off-Broadway musical that ran at the Carter Theatre in New York City in 1980

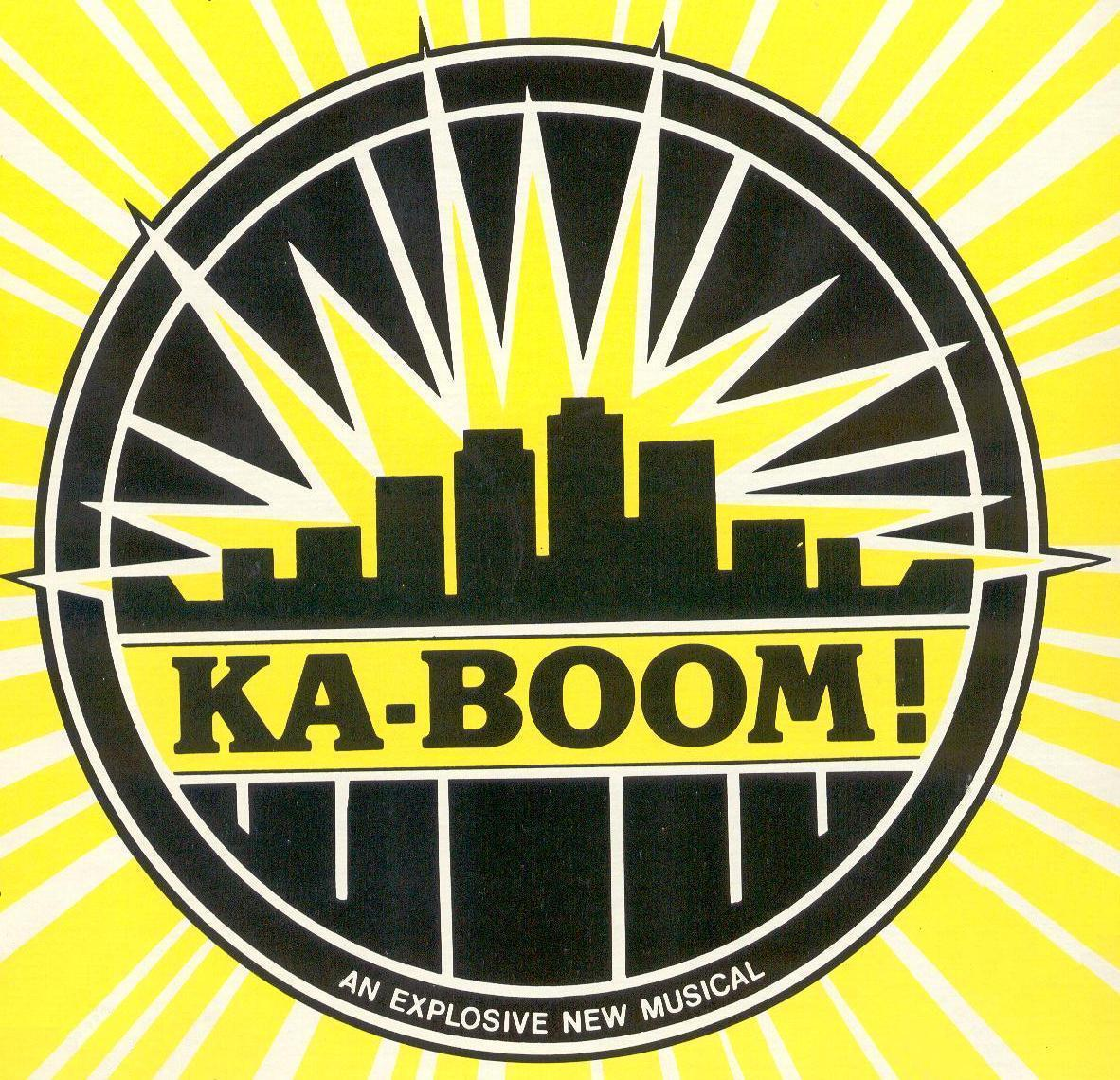
”Ka-Boom!” logo

Ka-Boom! was an off-Broadway musical that ran at the Carter Theatre in New York City in 1980. Directed by Godspell co-creator John-Michael Tebelak, with book and lyrics by Bruce Kluger and music by Joe Ercole, the two-act musical told the story of the five sole survivors of a nuclear holocaust that had destroyed the world, who were spared by God so that he could audition them for his new show, Creation, Part Two.

== Plot ==
Ka-Boom! opens with its characters on their knees, singing in prayer. We quickly discover that they are the five sole survivors of a nuclear war that has destroyed all of humanity. They are: Tony, a showy Las Vegas lounge singer who was performing at the Sands Hotel when the blast hit; Jasmine, a cynical writer whose resume included jobs at The New Yorker and The Village Voice; Hattie, a stripper who was dancing at her burlesque club, The Ka-Boom Room, when the world ended; June, a perky musical-comedy performer who'd just wrapped up her 17th national tour of Oklahoma!; and Matthew, a confused drama student struggling with his identity. Eventually, a fussy angel (Avery) appears and explains to them that they are to audition for God for his planned second Creation, and that, through their performances, they must demonstrate that they can fulfill God's vision of a new and better world. Most of the play's action revolves around the quintet's efforts to stage a group audition, though their first attempts fail, as the characters succumb to their old vices, such as pride and selfishness. Eventually, the five create an entirely new audition piece that reveals the ways in which they have learned and grown. Avery returns, reveals that he is, in fact, God, and announces that all five survivors have earned their place in the new Creation.

== Musical numbers ==
The Ka-Boom! score, written by Joe Ercole, with lyrics by Bruce Kluger, was an eclectic collection of songs, ranging in style from jazz and pop to Broadway and gospel.

=== Act I ===
- "Overture/Prologue" (Orchestra)
- "Now We Pray" (Ensemble)
- "Oh, Lord!" (Ensemble)
- "A Little Bit O' Glitter" (Tony)
- "Maybe For Instance" (Jasmine)
- "With a World to Conquer" (Hattie)
- "Smile" (June)
- "Let Me Believe in Me" (Matt)
- "Believe Us/Receive Us" (Ensemble)
- "A Few Get Through" (Jasmine)
- "The Ballad of Adam and Evie" (Tony, Hattie)
- "Give Me a 'G'" (June)
- "Finale" (Ensemble)
- "Maybe For Instance" (Reprise; Jasmine)
- "The Soft Spot" (Tony, Jasmine)
- "You Are You" (Ensemble)
- "The Light Around the Corner" (Ensemble)

=== Act II ===
- "Believe Us/Receive Us" (Reprise; Ensemble)
- "Those ABC's" (June, Ensemble)
- "Judgement Day" (Tony, Ensemble)
- "Bump and Grind for God" (Hattie, Ensemble)
- "Let Me Believe in Me" (Reprise; Matt, Ensemble)
- "Let the Show Go On!" (Avery, Ensemble)

== Critical reception ==
Ka-Boom! received mostly indifferent to negative reviews. While some critics admired the show's youthful enthusiasm, others found the characters and storyline cliché. John S. Wilson of The New York Times described Ka-Boom! as a mixture of Godspell, Jesus Christ Superstar and Babes in Arms, while calling the characters "lightly sketched stereotypes" and the play itself "bogged down in the message of salvation" that the creators wanted to deliver. Ka-Boom! closed on January 19, 1981, after a run of 16 previews and 70 performances.

== Production staff and cast ==
Ka-Boom! was produced by Jim Payne, in association with Sherie Seff and Bruce Kluger. The production's creators were Bruce Kluger (book and lyrics), Joe Ercole (music and orchestrations), John-Michael Tebelak (director), Nina Faso (associate director), Lynne Gannaway (choreographer), Ken Holamon (set design), Erica Hollman (costumes), Kirk Bookman (lighting), and John Lehman (musical direction and vocal arrangements).

The original opening night cast included Ben Agresti (Avery/God), Judith Bro (Jasmine), John Hall (Tony), Ken Ward (Matthew), Valerie Williams (Hattie), and Andrea Wright (June). (For the production, Ben Agresti used the pseudonym, Terry Barnes; and Valerie Williams used the pseudonym, Fannie Whitehead.)

The production and creative staff included Jim Payne (general manager), Maureen MacDonald (business manager), Herb Striesfeld (general press representative), Matthew Causey (stage manager), Curtis McKonly (assistant musical director), Margaret Rowan (lighting board operator/electrician), Roger Noonan (treasurer, theatre maintenance), Jean Morris (treasurer, assistant to Mr. Payne), James L'Ecuyer (dance captain), Duke Durfee (technical supervisor), Rob Taylor (production electrician), William Bair (theatre technical director), Arnold Herskovitz (ad representative), Barry Cole and Bruce Kluger (logo design), Ken Howard (photographer), R.A. Boyer (insurance), Lee Benedict (attorney; Gordon, Feinblatt, Rothman, Hoffberger, Hollander).

== Original cast album ==
The original cast album of Ka-Boom! was recorded in New York City in January 1981 and released two months later. It was produced by CYM Records.
