= Rick Shutter =

American drummer

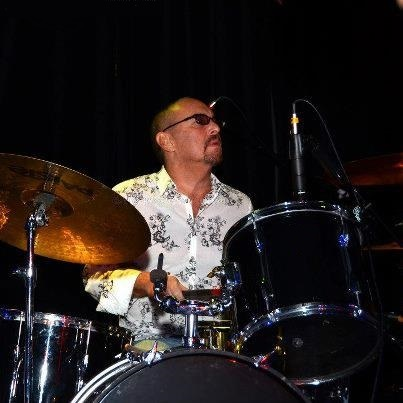
- Rick Shutter performing in September 2012

Background information
- Also known as: Ricky Shutter, Riki Shutter
- Occupations: Drummer, percussionist
- Instruments: drums, percussion
- Years active: 1964–present
- Labels: Arista; Bell; Mercury; RCA; Sony / CBS Records / Columbia Pictures
- Formerly of: The Young Executives
- Website: www.facebook.com/Ricky.Shutter

Rick Shutter is an American drummer and percussionist. He performed in the band for the original New York production of Godspell at the age of 19 and for the cast album of the musical and the soundtrack of the subsequent film adaptation. He has also been credited as Ricky Shutter and Riki Shutter.

== Career ==
Shutter began playing the drums at the age of 8, and in 1964, at the age of 13, he joined The Young Executives (also known as The Executives), a trio of young teenagers from Malverne, New York. Entertainment manager Steve Paul described the musicians as "twelve-year-old kids dressed in business suits". The band was signed by Mercury Records and its 1966 single, Everybody Do the Duck, broke into the national Billboard Hot 100 chart. The B-side was "Come On In Baby". The young band played shows and entertained in celebrity social circles in the New York City metropolitan area and the Hamptons. The teens played with or for such personalities as Leonard Bernstein, Sammy Davis Jr., Andy Warhol, and The Rolling Stones, and in concerts and at clubs such as Steve Paul's The Scene, Arthur, and Westhampton's The Barge (where The Rascals were discovered in 1965.) The band also appeared on the Clay Cole's Diskotek television show. The trio disbanded in 1966.

Shutter continued his career through his teen years. He worked club dates with Steven Scott Music, played the Catskills circuit, and backed up oldies acts such as Bo Diddley, The Shirelles, and Gary U.S. Bonds.

=== Godspell ===
In 1971 at the age of 19, Shutter began playing drums and percussion in the original four-piece band of the New York production of Godspell, whose score was created by Stephen Schwartz. Shutter then played in Godspell's Los Angeles company and on its national tour. (Note: Shutter's replacement in the New York company was Max Weinberg, who left the position when he won the audition to play in the E Street Band for Bruce Springsteen.) He also played on the Godspell cast album and the soundtrack for the ensuing film adaptation. While doing eight performances a week for the show, Shutter also did extensive session work that included demos, spec deals for record labels, and projects by singer-songwriters.

The stage production of Godspell features soft-rock music in a variety of styles. Paul Shaffer, music director of David Letterman's late-night talk shows, described Shutter's "big drums" as being "the defining sound" of the cast album. (Shaffer was the music director of Godspell's Toronto production and participated in the film soundtrack recording sessions). Modern Drummer magazine described Shutter as bringing "serious rock power" to the music.

The cast album was a commercial success, spending months as the only theatrical cast album in the top 100 in sales. Boosted by the strength of its "gargantuan hit single" Day by Day (Note: As of 2010, according to Godspell recordings collector Tom Peters, "It [Day by Day] was the last showtune to chart as performed by the original cast.") (which reached the top 10), the album's sales earned a Gold Record certification from the Recording Industry Association of America (RIAA) and ultimately reached the Platinum sales threshold. The cast album also garnered 1971 Grammy Awards for "Best Score From An Original Cast Show Album". (Note: In 2011, the Grammy Awards category "Best Score From An Original Cast Show Album" was renamed "Best Musical Theater Album.") The film soundtrack, released in 1973, was somewhat different from the cast album and was also a commercial success. The soundtrack reached the Top 40 and remained on the charts for almost a year, earning Gold Record status.

To support the growing franchise, Shutter and the stage ensemble performed in numerous media outlets, including the telecast of the 14th Annual Grammy Awards, ABC's Directions, Midday Live, Good Morning America, The Today Show, The Tonight Show, and video news productions for German television and the Japanese Television Network. Live performances occurred in New York City's Central Park and at Madison Square Garden. The soundtrack was also heard in the documentary The Filming of Godspell, broadcast on CBS.

=== Ongoing career ===
After leaving Godspell, Shutter was a staff session player for various record companies and recording studios; he has been independent since 1984. Shutter has worked on a variety of projects, including commercials and film soundtracks, and has continued to record and perform with regional and national acts. In 2018, Shutter joined Shaffer, Alice Ripley, Ben Vereen, and Don Scardino in a Godspell tribute at The Cutting Room music venue in New York City. The occasion was a benefit concert for the Orphaned Starfish Foundation, one of the charitable causes favored by Schwartz. In 2021, Shutter started playing with The Drifters.

Shutter continues to work with regional projects and bands in New York. In March 2024, he performed at the Long Island Music and Entertainment Hall of Fame preceding the induction ceremony honoring Schwartz. The band, led by Shaffer with Doug Quinn on guitar and Steve Manes on bass, accompanied Broadway vocalists including DeMarius R. Copes, Paul Kreppel, Dale Soules, Carrie St. Louis, Alysia Velez, and Teal Wicks. In April 2026, Shutter joined Shaffer, the Average White Band, Shemekia Copeland, Tom Chapin, Oz Noy, Carla Thomas, Vaneese Thomas, and others to perform at the Capitol Theatre in a concert that benefitted ALS United Greater New York.

Shutter endorses DW Drums, Evans Drumheads, GMS Drums, Humes & Berg drum cases, LP (Latin Percussion), and ProMark drumsticks.

== Selected credits ==
Albums

- Godspell (Bell, 1971) - original cast recording
- Godspell: Original Motion Picture Soundtrack - (Bell, 1973)
- Pepper (RCA, 1977) - Pepper
- Varela (Sunlost, 1977) - Varela
- Rock On: 1972 Chartbusters (MCA, 1996) - compilation includes Day by Day
- Test of Time (Gourmet, 2008) - Jesse Cutler
- Godspell: 40th Anniversary Cast Recording (SME, 2011)

Singles

- Everybody Do the Duck (Mercury, 1966) - The Young Executives
- Day by Day (Bell, 1972) - Godspell cast recording
- Beautiful City (Bell, 1973) - Godspell film soundtrack
- So Wild (RCA, 1977) - Pepper
- You're the One (1982) - The Chaperones

Film and television soundtracks

- Godspell
- The Filming of Godspell
- John Wayne: The Duke Lives On

Television appearances

- Grammy Awards
- The Tonight Show
- The Today Show
- Good Morning America
- Midday Live
- Directions
- Clay Cole's Diskotek
- Wonderama
- German television
- Japanese Television Network

== Awards ==
Year of Release	Work	Award	Category
1971	Godspell cast album	Grammy	Best Score From Original Cast Show Album
1971	Godspell cast album	Gold Record	
1973	Godspell film soundtrack	Gold Record	
