= M'Lady =

Studio album by Colleen Hewett
- Released: June 1974
- Studio: Bill Armstrong Studios, Melbourne
- Genre: Pop
- Label: Atlantic Records
- Producer: Mike Brady

Colleen Hewett chronology
Greatest Hits (1974)	M'Lady (1974)	Colleen (1983)

Singles from M'Lady
- 1. "Pippin'" / "I Can't Fly" Released: February 1974; 2. "I Believe When I Fall In Love" / "Seldom Seen Sam" Released: July 1974; 3. "If You Could Read My Mind" / "Haven't We Met Before" Released: 1975

M'Lady is the second studio album by Australian recording artist Colleen Hewett. The album was released in June 1974 by Atlantic Records

== Background ==
After having released her debut self titled album in October 1972 on the Festival Records label and winning Australia's Queen of Pop in 1972 and 1973, Hewett signed with Atlantic Records in January 1974 to record and release her second studio album. The album included the finale of Pippin which Hewett starred in throughout 1974.

== Track listing ==
Vinyl/ Cassette (SD 60000)

Side A

1. "I Believe When I Fall In Love" (Stevie Wonder, Yvonne Wright)
2. "If You Could Read My Mind" (Gordon Lightfoot)
3. "I'll Be Gone" (Mike Rudd)
4. "Here, There and Everywhere" (Lennon–McCartney)
5. "Seldom Seen Sam" (Terry Smith, J.W. Hopkinson)
6. "Pippin" (finale) (Stephen Schwartz)

Side B

1. "For The Good Times" (Kristoffer Kristofferson)
2. "I Can't Fly" (Colleen Hewett)
3. "Keep The Customer Satisfied" (Paul Simon)
4. "Haven't We Met Before" (Danny Beckerman)
5. "Butter Egg Man" (Percy Venable)
6. "Pinball Wizard" (Pete Townshend)

== Charts ==
Chart (1974)	Peak position
Australian Albums (Kent Music Report)	44
