= Godspell (film) =

1973 film by David Greene

- Theatrical release poster
- Directed by: David Greene
- Screenplay by: David Greene; John-Michael Tebelak
- Based on: Godspell; Stephen Schwartz; John-Michael Tebelak; Gospel of Matthew; Matthew the Apostle
- Produced by: Edgar Lansbury
- Starring: Victor Garber; David Haskell
- Cinematography: Richard Heimann
- Edited by: Alan Heim
- Music by: Stephen Schwartz
- Distributed by: Columbia Pictures
- Release dates: March 21, 1973 (New York); May 10, 1973 (Cannes)
- Running time: 102 minutes
- Country: United States
- Languages: English; Hebrew; Spanish
- Budget: $1.3 million
- Box office: $1.2 million (US/Canada rentals)

Godspell (full title: Godspell: A Musical Based on the Gospel According to St. Matthew) is a 1973 American musical comedy-drama film, an adaptation of the 1971 Off-Broadway musical Godspell (in turn based on the Gospel of Matthew), created by John-Michael Tebelak with music and lyrics by Stephen Schwartz.

Directed by David Greene with stars Victor Garber (in his film debut) as Jesus and David Haskell as Judas/John the Baptist, the film is set in contemporary New York City. Tebelak is credited as co-writer of the screenplay and served as creative consultant, although Greene said Tebelak did not write the screenplay.

== Plot ==
The voice of God opens the film, declaring his omnipotence: "My name is Known: God and King. I am most in majesty, in whom no beginning may be and no end." In New York City, John the Baptist arrives and calls a youthful cast of disciples to Central Park, beckoning them to "Prepare Ye, The Way of the Lord." He baptizes his congregation in the Bethesda Fountain. Jesus arrives and John baptizes Jesus, and the cast sings "Save The People" with Jesus.

They arrive at a scrapyard, where Jesus declares he came not to "abolish the law and the prophets but to complete." Jesus explains to the cast that those who keep the law will earn the highest place in the Kingdom of Heaven. The cast then acts out two parables, including the Pharisee and the Publican about a self-righteous Pharisee who thanks God he is not like other men, and the Parable of the Unforgiving Servant, which tells of a master who cancels his servant's debt. The servant then demands another man repay his owed debt in full. The master, hearing this, condemns the servant to prison. Jesus explains the moral: "Forgive your brothers from your heart."

The cast then sings "Day by Day." After this, Jesus explains to his disciples to "turn to them the other cheek," "hand over your coat" when they ask for your shirt, and walk with anyone for two miles. Jesus then teaches that no man can serve two masters (God and money). They arrive at the Andrew Carnegie Mansion and sing "Turn Back, O Man." The cast next performs the Parable of the Good Samaritan, with Jesus concluding his message is to do good deeds in secret.

Judas recites the parable of Lazarus and the rich man. On Earth, a rich man lives in luxury while Lazarus lives in poverty. Upon dying, Lazarus is rewarded in heaven. The rich man dies and is sent to hell, where he begs Abraham to have Lazarus warn his living brothers about their eternal fate. Abraham declines, stating if they are not convinced by Moses and the Prophets, they will never be convinced by Lazarus. The cast proceeds to sing "Bless the Lord."

Jesus and the disciples recite the Beatitudes. Judas directs the final beatitude regarding persecution at Jesus, and Jesus quickly changes the subject by instead singing "All for the Best." Jesus teaches his next moral to pray for your enemies and bless those who persecute you. This is followed by the cast performing the Parable of the Sower, to which Jesus explains the seed is the Word of God. A disciple then tells a story of a man who spent a lifetime acquiring treasures, and then dies before he can enjoy them. Jesus subsequently explains that God provides for all, to which the cast sings "All Good Gifts."

At the Cherry Lane Theatre, the cast performs the parable of The Prodigal Son, complete with clips from several silent films. The cast next performs "Light of the World," explaining that Christ's Light shines in each person. Aboard a vessel ship, the Pharisees ask Jesus multiple questions, including should they pay taxes to the government. Jesus answers to give respectively to God and men which is theirs'. The Pharisees leave and Jesus accuses them of being liars and hypocrites.

Jesus predicts his impending death, to which the cast consoles him by singing "By My Side." During the song, Judas foretells his betrayal of Jesus. They arrive on land and sing "Beautiful City." At the Last Supper, Jesus tells them that one of them will betray him. Jesus tells Judas to do what he must do and Judas leaves. Jesus breaks the bread and shares the wine, and recites the traditional Seder blessings. As Jesus blesses each disciple, the song "On the Willows" plays. Jesus then leaves and prays to God that the cup will pass from him. Jesus returns to find his disciples are sleeping. He wakes them up, but they all fall asleep again. Jesus warns them they will all betray him three times.

Judas returns with the police and embraces Jesus. Jesus is then held to an electric fence (representing the Cross), where he dies. The disciples carry Jesus's body as they reprise "Day by Day."

== Cast ==
- Victor Garber as Jesus Christ
- Katie Hanley as Katie, a diner waitress
- David Haskell as John the Baptist and Judas Iscariot
- Merrell Jackson as Merrell, a garment trader
- Joanne Jonas as Joanne, a ballet dancer
- Robin Lamont as Robin, a window shopper
- Gilmer McCormick as Gilmer, a model
- Jeffrey Mylett as Jeffrey, a taxi driver
- Jerry Sroka as Jerry, a parking attendant
- Lynne Thigpen as Lynne, a college student

Garber, Haskell, Jonas, Lamont, McCormick and Mylett had performed in one, or more, of the original 1970 Carnegie Mellon creation or the earliest commercial productions: 1971 Off-Broadway, 1971 Melbourne, and 1972 Toronto.

== Musical numbers ==
1. "Prepare Ye the Way of the Lord" - John the Baptist
2. "Save the People" - Jesus
3. "Day by Day" - Robin Lamont
4. "Turn Back, O Man" - Joanne Jonas
5. "Bless the Lord" - Lynne Thigpen
6. "All for the Best" - Jesus, Judas
7. "All Good Gifts" - Merrell Jackson
8. "Light of the World" - Jerry, Gilmer, Jeffrey, Robin
9. "Alas for You" - Jesus (Tebelak voices the Pharisee Monster)
10. "By My Side" - Katie
11. "Beautiful City" - Company
12. "Beautiful City" (Instrumental Reprise)
13. "On the Willows"
14. "Finale" - Jesus
15. "Day by Day" (Reprise) - Company

== Differences from the musical ==
The song "Beautiful City" was written for and first included in the film, while the songs "Learn Your Lessons Well" and "We Beseech Thee" were omitted. The melody for "Learn Your Lessons Well" is used briefly in an early scene of the film and again as incidental music, and snippets of both "Learn Your Lessons Well" and "We Beseech Thee" are heard in the scene inside Cherry Lane Theatre when Jesus plays their melodies on the piano during the story of The Prodigal Son.

While the play requires very little stage dressing, the film places emphasis on dramatic location shots in Manhattan. Except for the opening scenes and the final scene, the city streets and parks are devoid of people other than the cast. Locations include the following:

- The Brooklyn Bridge, where John the Baptist walks down the pedestrian walkway while humming "Prepare Ye the Way of the Lord" in the opening sequence;
- Bethesda Fountain in Central Park, in which the new disciples are baptized by John while singing "Prepare Ye";
- The long approaches of the Hell Gate Bridge on Randall's Island, where the disciples switch to their colorful clothing after baptism near the start of the film, and where they carry Jesus' body through the arches, creating a barrel-vaulted cathedral effect, after his crucifixion on a chain-link fence.
- The Soldiers' and Sailors' Monument on Riverside Drive;
- The Andrew Carnegie Mansion, in which they sing "Turn Back, O Man";
- Times Square, where Jesus and Judas are silhouetted by a screen of lights as they dance to "All For the Best";
- The central fountain at Lincoln Center, where Jesus and Judas dance on the fountain's stone lip as they sing "All for the Best";
- The top of the North Tower of the World Trade Center, which was nearing completion at the time of the film's production;
- A bird's-eye view of Fifth Avenue from above and behind St. Patrick's Cathedral, looking down on the Tishman Building during "Beautiful City";
- The exterior and interior of the Cherry Lane Theatre – where the first musical version of Godspell began its off-Broadway run the year before the film was shot – where the story of The Prodigal Son is told.

Vocally, the chorus is very much in the same style, but solo parts are, at times, more lyrical. Notably, in "All Good Gifts," whereas Lamar Alford had used a dramatic tenor voice, Merrell Jackson uses a lighter voice and falsetto for the high ornament, which creates a joyous effect.

Regarding the band, all four of the musicians from the original stage production and cast album were retained for the film recording. These musicians were Steve Reinhardt on keyboards, Jesse Cutler on acoustic and lead guitar and bass, Richard LaBonte on rhythm guitar and bass, and Ricky Shutter on drums and percussion. Reviewer William Ruhlmann explains that by having a larger budget than had been available for the stage, Schwartz was able to expand the line-up by adding key studio personnel such as lead guitarist Hugh McCracken (on "Prepare Ye (The Way of the Lord)"), keyboardist Paul Shaffer, bass player Steve Manes, a horn section, and six strings.

Ruhlmann describes Schwartz as being "better able to realize the score's pop tendencies than he had on the cast album... this was a less complete version of the score, but it was much better performed and produced, making this a rare instance in which the soundtrack album is better than the original cast album."

== Reception ==
The film was entered into the 1973 Cannes Film Festival.

Godspell received generally positive reviews in 1973. On Rotten Tomatoes the film has an approval rating of 63% based on reviews from 16 critics.

As star Victor Garber wrote in a 2026 article in Vulture, "Godspell opened in March 1973 to pretty good reviews and disappointing box office. It was overshadowed completely by the film adaptation of Jesus Christ Superstar ... released a few months after our film, to big crowds and grosses. Having recently watched our film for the first time in decades, I can see why it didn’t set the world alight. The stage is a better delivery system for a modular show of parables than a film. There is no compelling plotline to give the movie momentum, and there are slack moments when the set pieces simply don’t work. This wasn’t the funny Godspell of Toronto but an earnest expression of early-’70s youthful utopianism. But when the musical numbers work — as in 'Save the People' and 'Beautiful City,' a new song that Stephen Schwartz wrote especially for the film — the movie soars. What I see is a group of talented young people who committed themselves completely to the material, to moving effect."

== See also ==
- List of American films of 1973
- Godspell (1971 Off-Broadway Cast)
- Jesus Christ Superstar
  - Jesus Christ Superstar (film)
