= Colleen Hewett =

Australian singer and actress

- Born: 16 April 1950 (age 76); Bendigo, Victoria, Australia
- Occupations: Singer; recording artist; theatre performer; television actress
- Years active: 1962–present

Colleen Hewett (born 16 April 1950) is an Australian singer and actress.

Hewett's top 40 singles on the Kent Music Report include "Super Star", "Day by Day" (both 1971), "Carry That Weight" (1972), "Dreaming My Dreams with You" (1980) and "Gigolo" (1981). Her version of "Day by Day" peaked at No. 1 on the Go-Set National Top 40 Singles Chart and was certified as a gold record.

At the TV Week King of Pop Awards she was voted Queen of Pop in both 1972 and 1973.

Apart from being a staple in theatre roles, she is probably best known for her brief tenure as guest character Sheila Brady in the international hit TV series Prisoner, known internationally as Prisoner: Cell Block H.

== Early years ==
Colleen Hewett was born on 16 April 1950 in Bendigo. She has a sister, Glenys Hewett, who was a pop vocalist from the early sixties to mid-seventies. Glenys did release one single in 1973 on the RCA label, "C’est La Vie", with B-side "Captain Como".

== Career ==
=== 1962–1970: Career beginnings ===
Hewett began her music career at the age of 12 when she sang with the Esquires at the Bendigo YMCA. At about 13 years old she appeared on the TV pop music series The Go!! Show. Fifty years later she recalled "I wasn't of an age at that stage where I could go out on tour with anybody ... I came down from Bendigo with a band I was working with there ... then I came down again around my 14th birthday and did a solo spot on it ... they were just cover versions. I was just a little singer from Bendigo who came down on the train with the boys and did this amazing show that everybody watched."

From 1964 to 1966 she regularly performed with the Esquires and, in 1967, joined a vocal trio, the Creations, with her sister Glenys and Michelle Kennedy. That group also backed various solo singers including Billy Adams and then Buddy England and toured Australia. By April that year, with Kennedy, she joined a soul-based group, Dice, which were renamed the Laurie Allen Revue. Other members were Laurie Allen (ex-Bobby & Laurie) on lead vocals, lead guitar and organ; Harry Henri on guitar (soon replaced by Phil Manning); Barry Rodgers on bass guitar (soon replaced by Wayne Duncan); and Gary Young on drums.

In April 1967, Allen had told Go-Set: "I realized just a three piece group couldn't give me the sound I wanted, so I added two girl vocalists, [Hewett] and [Kennedy], they are an act in themselves and combined to give us a distinctive sound which can't be done by any Australian group." As a member of the Laurie Allen Revue, Hewett recorded on three singles; "Beautiful Brown Eyes" (August 1967), "Any Little Bit" (April 1968) and "As Long as I Got You" (June 1968). By mid-1968, Hewett had joined Ian Saxon and the Sound, with Saxon on lead vocals; Geoff Oakes on saxophone; Graeme Trottman on drums. In 1969, Hewett left the group and was replaced on vocals by Marlene Richards (ex-Ivan Dayman Band) before the group recorded their debut single, "Home Cookin'" (1970).

=== 1970–1983: "Day by Day" to Queen of Pop ===
Hewett started her solo music career in 1970, appearing regularly on TV pop music series, Bandstand. Her popularity with viewers resulted in her winning Best Newcomer Female Singer at the Bandstand Awards in December. She signed with Festival Records and her debut single, which was a cover version of Delaney and Bonnie's track, "Super Star" was released in June 1971. It reached No. 30 on the Go-Set National Top 40 Singles chart.

From 15 November 1971 to 22 July 1972 Hewett acted in the Australian musical theatre version of Godspell, at the Playbox Theatre, Melbourne. She recorded two versions of the show's tune, "Day by Day". The first on Godspell – Original Australian Cast had Johnny Young producing the cast album, which appeared in March 1972. The second version was produced by Ian "Molly" Meldrum and was issued as her second single, in November 1971. It peaked at No. 1 on the Go-Set charts and was certified as a gold record with shipment of over 50,000 copies. In April 1972 Hewett was the featured artist on a half-hour TV special performing "Day by Day", "By My Side", "Hey Jude" and "Jesus Christ Superstar".

After leaving Godspell, Hewett toured Australia performing in clubs and during TV appearances. Her debut self-titled album appeared in October 1972 and provided her next single, "Carry That Weight" – a cover of The Beatles track – which reached No. 29. She toured the United States and United Kingdom at the end of the year. At the TV Week King of Pop Awards she was voted Queen of Pop in both 1972 and 1973.

In January 1974, it was announced that Hewett had been signed to Atlantic Records. She released her second studio album M'Lady in June 1974. She travelled to the USA in 1975, after her contract with Pippin expired. In the US Colleen found it difficult to make progress and eventually returned to Australia in May 1977. In September 1977, Colleen was chosen for a lead role in a new ABC-TV series called The Truckies

In late 1979 she issued "Dreaming My Dreams with You" – originally by Waylon Jennings – which reached No. 2 on the Australian Kent Music Report Singles Chart. It was produced by Roger Savage and Robie G. Porter for Wizard Records. In November that year she performed "Day by Day" at the Mushroom Records-sponsored, The Concert of the Decade, which appeared on the Various Artists' album of the same name in January the following year. Her version of "Wind Beneath My Wings" was released in February 1983, which did not reach the top 50. During the federal election campaign from February to March that year, Hewett provided lead vocals for the Liberal Party's theme song, "We're not Waiting for the World".

=== 1984–present: Later work ===
Hewett was a guest vocalist with The Incredible Penguins in 1985 for a cover of "Happy Xmas (War Is Over)", a charity project for research on little penguins, which peaked at No. 10 on the Australian Kent Music Report in December.

In January 1992 she appeared in the theatre version of Return to the Forbidden Planet. In the 1990s she was working at radio station, Gold-FM.

From 3 August to 14 September 2006 she played Marion Woolnough, the mother of Peter Allen, in the Australian tour of The Boy From Oz headlined by Hugh Jackman. She also had a role as Matron "Mama" Morton in the musical Chicago with Caroline O'Connor and Craig McLachlan. In 2008, she played Johnny O'Keefe's mum in Shout! The Legend of The Wild One. In the 2011 movie The Cup she plays Pat Oliver, the mother of jockeys Jason and Damien Oliver.

In May 2015, Hewett released her first album in 14 years, titled Black & White. The album included the first single "Shut Up and Let Me Breathe" which is about domestic violence. The album debuted at number 1 on the ARIA Jazz and Blues Chart.

=== Theatre and television ===
On 31 March and 1 April 1973, Hewett had the role of "The Mother" (Mrs Walker) in the local version of the Who's rock opera Tommy. The other Australian artists were Daryl Braithwaite (as Tommy), Bobby Bright, Linda George, Jim Keays, Ian Meldrum (as "Uncle Ernie" in Sydney) Doug Parkinson, Wendy Saddington, Broderick Smith, Billy Thorpe and Ross Wilson. Hewett's other musical theatre credits include Pippin (February 1973 to August 1974). Hewett's role was Catherine, who is described as "a wealthy, pretty widow with a young son". While performing in Pippin, she and her co-star John Farnham (title role) also hosted a TV variety show, It's Magic, moving between the studio during the day and the theatre at night.

From the 1970s to the early 1990s, Hewett also acted in TV dramas: Matlock Police (1973), Homicide (1974–76), The Truckies (1977–78), Carson's Law, Division 4, Young Ramsay (1977), Cop Shop, Prisoner (1984–85) and The Flying Doctors (1991).

== Personal life ==
Hewett married Danny Finley (ex-MPD Ltd drummer) in 1970. He was also her manager and agent during the 1970s and 1980s. From 1978, Finley also managed John Farnham; in mid-1979 Hewett, Finley and Farnham were partners in a restaurant, Backstage, in Melbourne. Farnham described the venture "[they] were putting their names on the line for a product they had complete trust in. They would have complete control of the restaurant, but would leave the menu management to the master chef". However the venture was "ill-fated" and became a "near disaster" financially. In October 1980, Finley assisted Johnny Young on his Young Talent Time program and related TV ventures. Hewett and Finley divorced. She later recalled "I suppose you expect there to be something terrible or a nasty fight, but there wasn't ... I pulled the pin." Finley subsequently became her manager again.

Hewett was married and divorced a second time; her second husband (whom she referred to as "the Frenchman") had died by 2013. For her third marriage, in 2002 to Ian Aiken, a former Australian businessman: they generally lived in Fiji. In early 2006, Aiken left Hewett and they subsequently divorced with Aiken remarrying his former wife of 30 years, Eva Aiken; Aiken died in Fiji in early 2008.

Hewett is the great-granddaughter of Edward Rollins, an Australian middleweight boxer who ran away from his native Guyana in the 1860s and first arrived in Australia via Britain in 1881. Her grandmother on her maternal side is of African American descent.

As of 2000, Hewett has been in semi-retirement, spending time in Melbourne, Bendigo and Fiji with family and friends.

== Discography ==
=== Albums ===
List of albums, with selected chart positions
Title	Album details	Peak chart positions
Title	Album details	KMR
Colleen Hewett	Released: October 1972; Format: LP; Label: Festival Records	28
Greatest Hits	Released: May 1974; Format: LP; Label: Festival Records	—
M'Lady	Released: June 1974; Format: LP; Label: Atlantic Records	44
Colleen	Released: May 1983; Format: LP; Label: Avenue Records	48
Power of Love	Released: June 1986; Format: LP; Label: J&B Records	—
Tenterfield Dreams: The Musical Journey of Peter Allen	Released: June 1997; Format: CD; Label: MRA (MR60102)	53
Bulamama	Released: December 2001; Format: CD; Label: Colossal Records	—
Black & White	Released: 22 May 2015; Format: CD; Label: Bilarm Music Pty Ltd	—
"—" denotes releases that did not chart or were not released in that country.

=== Soundtrack albums ===
List of soundtrack albums, as lead artist, with selected chart positions and certifications
Title	Details	Peak chart positions
Title	Details	KMR
Godspell – Original Australian Cast	Released: March 1972; Label: Festival Records; Format: LP	18
Pippin (with Johnny Farnham)	Released: July 1974; Label: EMI; Format: LP	60

=== Singles ===
Year	Title	Peak chart positions		Album
Year	Title	Go-Set	KMR	Album
1971	"Super Star"	30	32	Colleen Hewett
1971	"Day by Day" (with Boys of the St Paul's Cathedral Choir)	1	2	Colleen Hewett
1972	"Carry That Weight"	29	29	Colleen Hewett
1973	"Waltzing Matilda"	—	80	Colleen Hewett
1973	"A Wish to Wish"	—	—	Colleen Hewett
1973	"Sit Yourself Down"	—	94	Greatest Hits
1974	"Pippin (Finale)"	—	—	Pippin – Original Australian Cast
1974	"I Believe When I Fall in Love"	—	51	M'Lady
1974	"If You Could Read My Mind"	—	—	M'Lady
1979	"Dreaming My Dreams with You"	—	2	'Non-album single'
1981	"Gigolo"	—	28	'Non-album single'
1982	"Hearts"	—	—	Colleen
1983	"The Wind Beneath My Wings"	—	52	Colleen
1983	"I Hope I Never"	—	—	Colleen
1984	"If You Ever Feel the Need"	—	72	'Non-album single'
1996	"Street Angel"	—	—	Tenterfield Dreams: The Musical Journey of Peter Allen
2000	"Reconciliation"	—	—	Bulamama
2015	"Shut Up and Let Me Breathe"	—	—	Black & White
"—" denotes a recording that did not chart or was not released in that territory.

== Theatre Appearances ==
- Godspell (1971–1972)
- Pippin (1973–1974)
- Return to the Forbidden Planet (1992)
- The Boy From Oz (2006)
- Chicago (2007)
- Shout! The Legend of the Wild One (2008)

== Awards and nominations ==
=== Go-Set Pop Poll ===
The Go-Set Pop Poll was coordinated by teen-oriented pop music newspaper, Go-Set and was established in February 1966 and conducted an annual poll during 1966 to 1972 of its readers to determine the most popular personalities.

Year	Nominee / work	Award	Result
1970	herself	Girl Vocal	3rd
1971	herself	Best Girl Vocal	3rd
1972	herself	Best Female	3rd

=== King of Pop Awards ===
The King of Pop Awards were voted by the readers of TV Week. The King of Pop award started in 1967 and ran through to 1978.

Year	Nominee / work	Award	Result
1972	herself	Queen of Pop	Won
1973	herself	Queen of Pop	Won

=== Countdown awards ===
Countdown was an Australian pop music TV program on national broadcaster ABC-TV from 1974 to 1987. It presented music awards from 1979 to 1987, initially in conjunction with the magazine TV Week. The awards were a combination of popular-vote and peer-voted awards.

Year	Nominee / work	Award	Result
1979	herself	Most Popular Female Performer	Nominated

== Television and Film Appearances ==
=== Film ===
Film
Year	Title	Role	Type
2011	The Cup	Pat Oliver	Feature film

=== Television ===
Television
Year	Title	Role	Type
1964 - 1965	The Go!! Show	Herself	TV series, 3 episodes
1972	Colleen	Herself sings "Day By Day" / "By My Side" / "Hey Jude" / "Jesus Christ Superstar"	TV special
1972 - 1975	The Graham Kennedy Show	Herself sings "Carry That Weight"	TV series, 15 episodes, Regular
1974 - 1976	Homicide	Debbie Brent / Daphne Day / Nora Fleming	TV series, 3 episodes Guest roles
1978	The Truckies	Carol	ABC TV series, 12 episodes, Lead role
1979	Cop Shop	Jill Wightman / Wendy Bolton	TV series, 4 episodes, Guest roles
1980	Farnham and Byrne	Herself	ABC TV series, 1 episode
1985	Prisoner	Sheila Brady	TV series, 11 episodes, recurring role
1990–1993	Tonight Live With Steve Vizard	Herself – Regular performer	TV series
1993	Halfway Across the Galaxy and Turn Left	Mrs. Roland	TV series, 11 episodes, Regular role
