= Colleen (album) =

Studio album by Colleen Hewett
- Released: 1983
- Recorded: AAV Studios, Australia
- Label: Avenue
- Producer: John Wood, James Barton, Peter Martin, Roger Savage

Colleen Hewett chronology
M'Lady (1974)	Colleen (1983)	Power of Love (1986)

Singles from Colleen
- 1. "Hearts" / "Take Me In Your Arms" Released: September 1982; 2. "Wind Beneath My Wings" / "Constantly" Released: February 1983; 3. "I Hope I Never" / "Sleepless Nights" Released: July 1983

Colleen is the third studio album by Australian recording artist Colleen Hewett. The album was released in 1983 by Avenue Records.

== Track listing ==
1. "When The Feeling Comes Around" (Rick Cunha) - 3:20
2. "Tell Me That You Love Me" (S.Gibb, B.Cason) - 3:20
3. "The Wind Beneath My Wings" (Jeff Silbar, Larry Henley) - 3:20
4. "What Could You Know About Love" (S.Gibb, B.Cason) - 3:05
5. "I Hope I Never" (Tim Finn) - 4:20
6. "Hearts (Our Hearts)" (D.Allen, K.Beal) - 3:13
7. "Dreaming My Dreams with You" (Allen Reynolds) - 3:45
8. "Since I Loved Like That" (Sandy Mason) - 2:15
9. "Gigolo" (R.Soja, F.Dostal) - 3:14
10. "What If You Fell In Love" (Even Stevens) - 3:22
11. "When I Dream" (Sandy Mason) - 3:36
12. "Motion" (Allen Toussaint) - 4:53

== Charts ==
Chart (1983)	Peak position
Australian Albums (Kent Music Report)	48
