= Gilmer McCormick =

American actress and singer (born 1947)

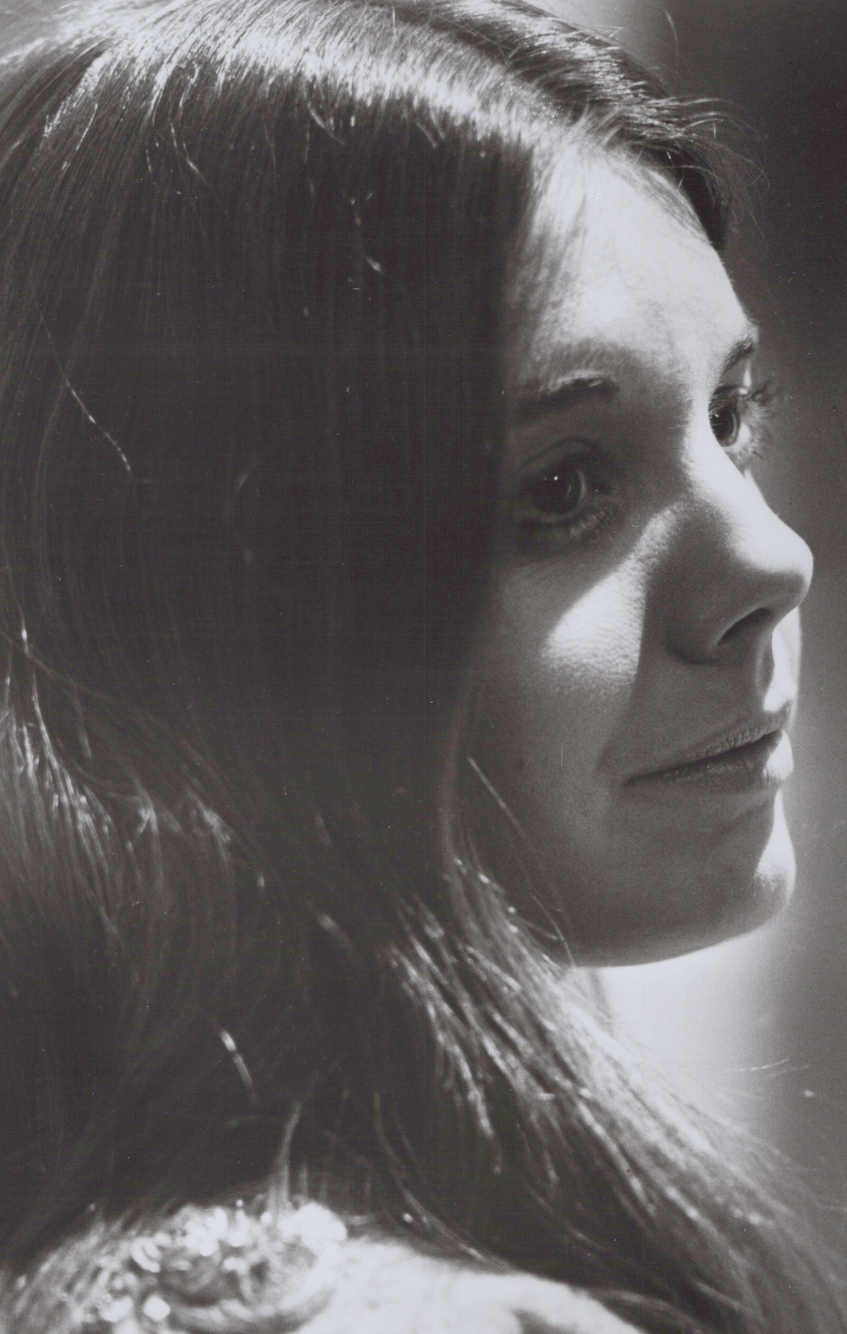
- McCormick in 1970
- Born: Louisville, Kentucky, U.S.
- Education: Carnegie Mellon University
- Occupation: Actress
- Years active: 1970–1985
- Children: 1

Gilmer McCormick is an American actress and singer best known for her performance in the stage and film versions of Godspell in the early 1970s and for her role as Sister Margaret in the 1984 horror film Silent Night, Deadly Night.

== Early life and education ==
McCormick was born in Louisville, Kentucky. In 1965, she graduated from Moravian Academy in Bethlehem, Pennsylvania She attended Carnegie Mellon University in Pittsburgh, where she graduated in 1969.

== Career ==
McCormick originated the role of "Gilmer" in the first New York production of Godspell. She appeared in two films—Squares (1972) and Slaughterhouse-Five (1972)—before joining several of her fellow cast members in the 1973 film version of the musical. Her stage solo "Learn Your Lessons Well" was not included in the movie version, but it can be heard on the 1971 off-Broadway cast recording. Her later film appearances include the Burt Reynolds comedy Starting Over (1979) and the TV movie The Burning Bed (1984), starring Farrah Fawcett.

== Filmography ==
=== Film ===
Year	Title	Role	Notes
1972	Squares	Chase Lawrence	
1972	Slaughterhouse-Five	Lily Rumfoord	
1973	Godspell	Gilmer	
1979	Starting Over	Stephanie	
1984	Silent Night, Deadly Night	Sister Margaret	
1999	A Journey in Faith	Self	

=== Television ===
Year	Title	Role	Notes
1970	NET Playhouse	Princess Thulja	Episode: "The Ceremony of Innocence"
1974	CBS Daytime 90	Susan Banks	Episode: "The Guest Room"
1976	The Adams Chronicles	Marian Hooper Adams	Episode: "Chapter XII: Henry Adams, Historian"
1981	Hill Street Blues	Maureen Macafee	Episode: "Double Jeopardy"
1982	American Playhouse	Grape-buying woman	Episode: "Working"
1984	The Burning Bed	Salesperson	Television film
1985	I Had Three Wives	—N/a	Episode: "You and I Know"
