= Richard D. Trentlage =

- Born: Richard Dale Trentlage; December 27, 1928; Chicago, Illinois, United States
- Died: September 21, 2016 (aged 87) Libertyville, Illinois, United States
- Occupation: Jingle writer

Richard Dale Trentlage (December 27, 1928 – September 21, 2016) was an American jingle writer. He wrote jingles for McDonald's, the National Safety Council, and V8, but he is best known for the long-running jingle for Oscar Mayer wieners. Adver/Sonic Productions was formed by Henry Brandon, Trentlage, and Jack Sherred.

== Early life ==
Trentlage was born in Chicago, Illinois, where he attended Calumet High School. He composed his first jingle in high school, and he played guitar in a band with his brother and a friend. He graduated from Calumet in 1947.

== Career ==
Trentlage later enjoyed playing the banjo ukulele. He went to work in advertising and was employed by large firms that included McCann Erickson.

Trentlage wrote jingles for McDonald's ("McDonald's is your kind of place!"), the National Safety Council ("Buckle up for safety, buckle up!") and V8 ("Wow! It sure doesn't taste like tomato juice."), founding Adver/Sonic Productions. In the late 1990s Trentlage was living in Fox River Grove, Illinois and still writing jingles.

In 1962, Trentlage learned that Oscar Mayer was holding a jingle contest for its hot dogs. With the deadline the next day, he wrote:

Oh, I wish I were an Oscar Mayer wiener / That is what I’d truly like to be
’Cause if I were an Oscar Mayer wiener / Everyone would be in love with me.

For the recording, Trentlage played the banjo ukulele while his son and daughter sang the words and his wife played the standup bass. Trentlage's daughter Linda had a stuffy nose at the time of the recording, and Mayer thought that mothers would identify with children who had stuffy noses.

A year later, Trentlage's submission was selected. Mayer sent Trentlage and his children to a Chicago recording studio, with Linda suffering from a stuffy nose again. After successfully testing it in the Houston market, Oscar Mayer used the jingle in its advertising from 1963 to 2010. The company later credited it with the success of the product's nationwide distribution.

In a 2008 interview he said he was still receiving royalties from the Oscar Mayer jingle, which had helped put his children through college.

== Personal life ==
He was married to his first wife, Vivian Youngs, for 23 years and had five children. After divorcing, he married his second wife, Jackie, in the 1980s.

Trentlage died of heart failure in 2016 at a hospital in Libertyville, Illinois. He was survived by his second wife and several children and stepchildren. His daughter Linda, one of two children featured in the Oscar Mayer jingle, became an educational administrator in Wisconsin.
