= Oscar Mayer =

American meat production company

- Type: Subsidiary
- Founded: 1883; 143 years ago
- Founder: Oscar F. Mayer
- Headquarters: Chicago, Illinois, U.S.
- Parent: Kraft Heinz
- Website: oscarmayer.com

Oscar Mayer is an American meat and cold cut producer known for its hot dogs, bologna, bacon, ham, and Lunchables products. The company is a subsidiary of the Kraft Heinz Company and based in Chicago, Illinois.

== History ==
=== Early years ===
German immigrant Oscar F. Mayer (1859–1955), born in Kösingen, Germany, began working at a meat market in Detroit, Michigan, and later in Chicago, Illinois. In 1883, Mayer and his brother Gottfried leased the Kolling Meat Market on the near-northside of Chicago. The Mayer brothers sold bratwurst, liverwurst, and weißwurst, which were popular in the predominantly German neighborhoods around their Chicago meat market.

As the meat market's popularity grew, it expanded its storefront and participated in sponsoring local events including the 1893 Chicago World's Fair. By 1900, the company had 43 employees and Chicago-wide delivery service. In 1904, Oscar Mayer began branding its meats to capitalize on their popularity, beginning an industry-wide trend. Early company specialties were "Old World" sausages and Westphalian hams, soon followed by bacon and wieners. In 1906, Oscar Mayer & Co. volunteered to join the newly created federal meat inspection program. In 1919, the company made its first major expansion, with the purchase of a processing plant in Madison, Wisconsin. The plant was a profitable, efficient operation, and in 1957 Madison became the corporate headquarters.

=== Kraft ownership ===
For nearly a century, Oscar Mayer remained an independent company owned primarily by descendants of the Mayer brothers who started it. In 1981, Oscar Mayer stockholders elected to sell the company to General Foods. Four years later, Philip Morris acquired General Foods, and in 1989 merged General Foods with the newly acquired Kraft Foods into Kraft General Foods. Shares of Kraft Foods were first offered to the public via an initial public offering in 2001. Altria Group (formerly Philip Morris) spun-off remaining shares of Kraft Foods to Altria shareholders in 2007.

On November 4, 2015, owner Kraft Heinz announced it would move the Oscar Mayer headquarters and the company's U.S. meats business from Madison back to Chicago. The company also announced plans to consolidate its production facilities during the two following years, resulting in the shutdown of seven North American manufacturing facilities: Fullerton, California, San Leandro, California, Federalsburg, Maryland, St. Marys, Ontario, Campbell, New York, Lehigh Valley, Pennsylvania, and Madison.

In August 2017, Bloomberg Businessweek reported that the company planned to spend $10 million to reinvent the hot dog for a more health-conscious consumer.

== Advertisements ==
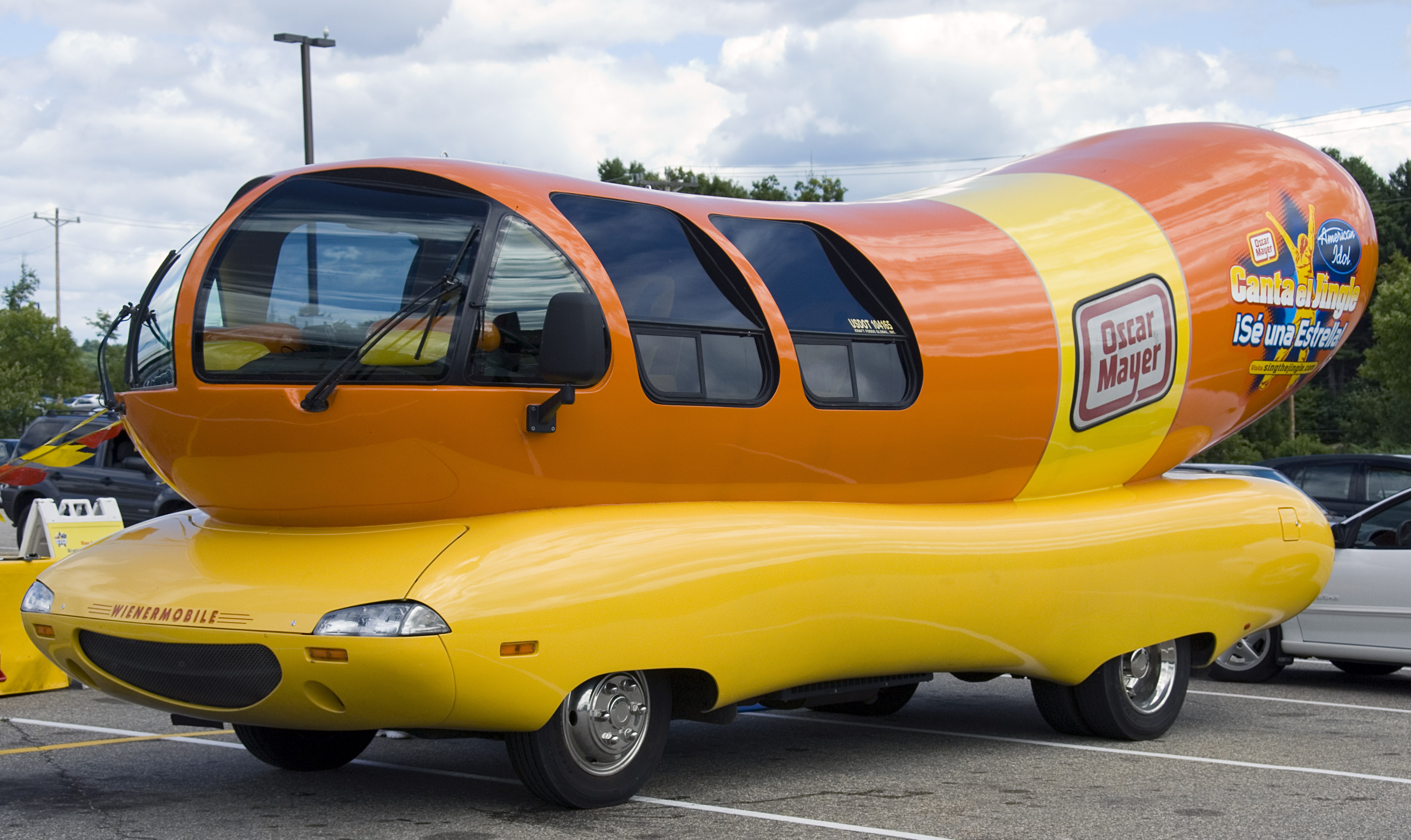
Wienermobile in Gilford, New Hampshire

Oscar Mayer had several advertisements on TV involving young children, including the Oscar Mayer Wiener ad in 1963. The commercial shows a young girl leading a group of children, singing that they'd "love to be an Oscar Mayer wiener". It was written by Richard D. Trentlage.

A 1973 TV commercial featured four-year-old Andy Lambros holding a fishing rod and sandwich while singing, "My bologna has a first name, it's 'O-S-C-A-R'...". It became one of the longest-running TV commercials in the country.

Oscar Mayer is known for its Wienermobile, which has toured the United States for over 80 years. The first Wienermobile was created in 1936. On May 14, 2023, it was announced that the Wienermobile would be renamed the Frankmobile; four months later, this unpopular name change was reversed.

In 2019, Oscar Mayer started sponsoring Ryan Newman in the NASCAR cup series in the number 6 Roush Fenway Racing car. It later announced a two-year extension to the agreement.

On May 23, 2025, Indianapolis Motor Speedway and Oscar Mayer hosted the Wienie 500, a race between six Wienermobiles.
