= Black & White (Colleen Hewett album) =

Studio album by Colleen Hewett
- Released: 22 May 2015
- Label: Bilarm Music Pty Ltd

Colleen Hewett chronology
Bulamama (2001)	Black & White (2015)

Black & White is a studio album by Australian recording artist, Colleen Hewett. The album was released in The album is Hewett's first album in 14 years and sees Colleen singing genres ranging from emotional ballads, country and soulful blues tracks. Lyrically, the album features tracks dealing with family history, her ancestry and experience with domestic violence.

Hewett said; "This album is my best. I know it is because I selected every single song. There are a lot of original songs on it and a lot of storytelling to do with my grandmother and my past. It's very much a blues album."

In 2015, Colleen was proud to be announced Ambassador for the Rotary initiative Violence Free Families and $5 from every sale went towards the foundation.

== Reception ==
Molly Meldrum said; "This is Colleen's best album ever. She is fantastic and I love her…". Jeff Jenkins said; "Her vocal – both nuanced and powerful – is stunning. Put simply, Black & White is a classic". John Laws said "Colleen Hewett is brilliant.. her singing almost rips your heart out".

== Singles ==
The lead single "Shut Up and Let Me Breathe" is a potent song about domestic violence and was written for the Violence Free Families initiative. In an interview with her FanClub, she said "It's saying, just come on, shut up, let me breathe… it's not about the strangulation, it's about wanting personal space. If you’ve had anything emotional: bullying or intimidation, you question yourself, anyone who's had that understands it's not about you it's about me. So the song is not so much about the person who is doing the damage, it's about doubting yourself."

The video for "Shut Up and Let Me Breathe" features cameo appearances from John Farnham, Archie Roach, Rosie Batty, Eddie McGuire, Neil Mitchell, Molly Meldrum and Derryn Hinch.

== Track listing ==
1. "Blues Is My Business"
2. "Rockin' Chair"
3. "Daddy Said"
4. "I Sing the Blues"
5. "Shut Up and Let Me Breathe"
6. "I'm Walkin'"
7. "Starlight"
8. "Shut Your Mouth"
9. "Takin' the Good With the Bad"
10. "The Key"
11. "Headin' Down the Highway"

== Charts ==
=== Weekly charts ===
Chart (2015)	Peak position
Australian Jazz and Blues Albums Chart (ARIA)	1

=== Year-end charts ===
Chart (2015)	Rank
Australian Jazz and Blues Albums Chart (ARIA)	36
