= David Haskell =

American actor

- Born: David Michael Haskell; June 4, 1948; Stockton, California, United States
- Died: August 30, 2000 (aged 52); Woodland Hills, Los Angeles, United States
- Occupation: Actor
- Years active: 1972–1998

David Michael Haskell (June 4, 1948 – August 30, 2000) was an American film, stage and television actor and singer best known for his performance in the musical Godspell.

== Early life ==
David Haskell was born in Stockton, California. David graduated from Terra Linda High School, San Rafael, California, in June 1966.

He attended the College of Marin before transferring to Carnegie Mellon University.

He was also a Past Master Councilor of the Mill Valley Chapter, Order of DeMolay.

== Career ==
Haskell is best remembered for his performance in the 1970s in the New York City, New York, Off-Broadway musical-theatre production Godspell and its subsequent film adaptation (1973) in the dual roles of John the Baptist and Judas Iscariot. He also appeared as Claudio in the Joseph Papp Public Theater/New York Shakespeare Festival off-Broadway theatre production (1976), at the Delacorte Theater, of the play Measure for Measure (circa 1603 or 1604) by William Shakespeare.

He played recurring character Nick Hartley on the soap opera Santa Barbara from 1985-1986, the love interest of the character Kelly Capwell played by Robin Wright. He can also be seen as the doctor who saves the life of the dog Jerry Lee at the end of the 1989 movie K-9.

Haskell also made various guest appearances on several television series from the 1970s to the 1990s. Included in these is a 1973 appearance in The Mary Tyler Moore Show in the fourth season episode, "Cottage for Sale". He played a newlywed home buyer named David Russell. He also appeared on Eight is Enough in 1979 as Ed Gardner in the third season, Episode 22, "The Kid Who Came to Dinner."

== Death ==
David Haskell died on August 30, 2000 of brain cancer, aged 52, in Woodland Hills, a suburb near Los Angeles, California.

== Partial filmography ==
- Godspell (1973) - John the Baptist / Judas Iscariot
- Seems Like Old Times (1980) - Policeman
- Deal of the Century (1983) - Rockwell Official
- Body Double (1984) - Will
- Santa Barbara (1985-1986) - Nick Hartley
- The Boost (1988) - Doctor
- K-9 (1989) - Doctor
