= Godspell =

Musical

- Original cast recording
- Music: Stephen Schwartz
- Lyrics: Stephen Schwartz
- Book: John-Michael Tebelak
- Basis: Gospel of Matthew (primarily)
- Productions: 1971 Off-Broadway; 1971 London; 1976 Broadway; 1988 Off-Broadway; 2000 Off-Broadway; 2001 US Tour; 2007 UK Tour; 2011 Broadway; 2012 US tour

Godspell is a musical in two acts with music and lyrics by Stephen Schwartz and a book by John-Michael Tebelak. The show is structured as a series of parables, primarily based on the Gospel of Matthew, interspersed with music mostly set to lyrics from traditional hymns, with the passion of Christ appearing briefly near the end.

Godspell began as a project by drama students at Carnegie Mellon University and then moved to the off-off-Broadway theater La MaMa Experimental Theatre Club in the East Village of Manhattan. The show was rescored for an off-Broadway production, which opened on May 17, 1971, and became a long-running success. Many productions have followed worldwide, including a 2011 Broadway revival. An abbreviated one-act version of the musical designed for performers aged 18 and under also exists, titled Godspell Junior.

Several cast albums have been released over the years. "Day by Day", from the original cast album, reached #13 on the pop singles chart Billboard Hot 100 in the summer of 1972 and #7 in Canada's RPM 100 Singles chart.

== Characters ==
The show features eight non-Biblical characters, who sing and act out the parables: Gilmer (silly, a great storyteller); Robin (a tomboy); Herb (goofy and entertaining); Jeffrey (happy and excited); Joanne (eager and enthusiastic); Lamar (clumsy and unintentionally funny); Peggy (shy and loyal); and Sonia (dramatic with a put-on sensuality). In the original script, licensed through Theatre Maximus, the "Christ" character and the "John" and "Judas" role are assigned the names of the original performers, Stephen and David. All ten actors are on stage throughout the entirety of the production.

In the revised script used for the 2011 Broadway revival, the names of the cast are again assigned to the non-Biblical roles: Nick, Telly, George, Anna Maria, Lindsay, Uzo, Morgan, and Celisse. Each character is also assigned a few character traits. An ensemble can also be added to the production if needed.

== Casts ==
Since the names of the characters are normally changed to the cast members' names in professional productions, the names here match the character's main solo, excluding Jesus and John/Judas. These are the names the characters are referred to in the licensing of the show.

Notable Casts
| Character | Off-Broadway (1971) | London (1971) | Toronto (1972) | Film (1973) | Broadway (1976) | Broadway (2011) |
|---|---|---|---|---|---|---|
| Jesus | Stephen Nathan | David Essex | Victor Garber | Victor Garber | Don Scardino | Hunter Parrish |
| John the Baptist/Judas | David Haskell | Jeremy Irons | Gerry Salsberg | David Haskell | Tom Rolfing | Wallace Smith |
| "Day by Day" | Robin Lamont | Julie Covington | Andrea Martin | Robin Lamont | Robin Lamont | Anna Maria Perez de Tagle |
| "Learn Your Lessons Well" | Gilmer McCormick | Verity-Anne Meldrum | Gilda Radner | Gilmer McCormick | Marley Sims | Celisse Henderson |
| "Bless the Lord" | Joanne Jonas | Marti Webb | Avril Marie Chown | Lynne Thigpen | Valerie Williams | Lindsay Mendez |
| "All Good Gifts" | Lamar Alford | Tom Saffery | Rudy Webb | Merrell Jackson | Lamar Alford | Telly Leung |
| "Light of the World" | Herb Braha | Deryk Parkin | Eugene Levy | Jerry Sroka | Laurie Faso | George Salazar |
| "Turn Back, O Man" | Sonia Manzano | Gay Soper | Jayne Eastwood | Joanne Jonas | Lois Foraker | Morgan James |
| "By My Side" | Peggy Gordon | Jacquie-Ann Carr | Valda Aviks | Katie Hanley | Elizabeth Lathram | Uzo Aduba |
| "We Beseech Thee" | Jeffrey Mylett | Neil Fitzwiliam | Martin Short | Jeffrey Mylett | Bobby Lee | Nick Blaemire |

Notable replacements include: Corbin Bleu as Jesus (Broadway 2011), Sonia Manzano (Broadway 1976), Don Scardino (Toronto 1972), Dave Thomas (Toronto 1972), and Victor Garber (Off-Broadway 1972).

== Synopsis ==
=== Act I ===
The show opens with the "Opening (Monologue)", as God's voice, spoken by Jesus, declaring his supremacy: "My name is Known: God and King. I am most in majesty, in whom no beginning may be and no end." The cast then enters and takes the roles of various philosophers who sing their philosophies, first alone, then in cacophonous counterpoint ("Prologue: Tower of Babble").

In response, John the Baptist enters blowing a shofar to call the community to order. He then beckons them to "Prepare Ye, The Way of the Lord!" and baptizes the cast ("Prepare Ye"). John gives a short sermon, as Jesus watches quietly. Jesus then announces his presence and says that he also wishes to be baptized. John instead asks to be baptized by Jesus. Jesus explains that "We do well now to conform with all that God requires" and is baptized by John. The cast enters and sings with Jesus ("Save the People").

In his first parable, Jesus explains that he has come "not to abolish the law and the prophets, but to complete." Jesus explains to the cast that those who adhere to the law of God will earn the highest place in the Kingdom of Heaven. He tells them the parable of the Widow and the Judge, demonstrating that God is a just jurist who will support those who cry out to him.

The cast begins to understand Jesus's teachings and take it upon themselves to tell the story of the Pharisee and the Publican praying in the temple: "Every man who humbles himself shall be exalted!"

As Jesus teaches the law of the offering gifts at the altar, the cast makes offerings of themselves. They are taught that to approach God's altar, they must be pure of heart and soul. They then act out the Parable of the Unforgiving Servant, a story of a master and a servant who owes him a debt. The servant asks his master for pity in repaying the debt, and the master absolves it. The servant then turns to a fellow servant who "owed him a few dollars" and demands that it be paid in full. The master, hearing this, then condemns the servant to prison. Jesus explains the moral: "Forgive your brothers from your heart." The character telling the parable sings "Day by Day", and the cast joins in. After the song, Jesus teaches that if one part of you offends God, it is better to lose it than to have the whole of the body thrown into hell.

The cast then plays charades to finish several statements posed by Jesus, including "If a man sues you for your shirt..." and "If a man asks you to go one mile with him...." The cast then performs the Parable of the Good Samaritan as a play-within-a-play. Jesus explains the need to "love your enemies" and "not make a show of religion before men". He says: "God will reward a good deed done in secret" ("Shhh! It's a secret!").

The cast then performs the parable of Lazarus and the rich man. On earth, the rich man feasts, and Lazarus begs and is ignored. Upon dying, Lazarus is rewarded with Heaven, while the rich man is in Hell. The audience is told to "Learn Your Lessons Well" or be faced with eternal damnation. When the rich man asks Abraham if he would send Lazarus back from the dead to warn his brothers of their impending doom, Abraham tells him no: "If they do not listen to Moses and the Prophets, they will not be convinced even if someone should rise from the dead."

Jesus teaches that no man can serve two masters (God and money). A member of the cast tells a story of a man who spent a lifetime acquiring the good things in life, then dies before he has the time to enjoy them. This character sings "Bless the Lord," then Jesus tells the cast not to worry about tomorrow: "Tomorrow will take care of itself. Today has problems of its own."

In an antiphonic chorus, the cast recites the Beatitudes. Judas directs the final beatitude regarding persecution at Jesus, and Jesus quickly changes the subject ("Did I ever tell you that I used to read feet?"). Jesus then persuades the cast that it is "All for the Best" and heaven contains the ultimate reward as Jesus and Judas do a soft shoe together.

This is followed by the parable of the Sower of the Seeds, which Jesus tells them represent the Word of God ("All Good Gifts").

By this point in the musical, the group has transformed from a ragtag cast into a community of love and caring. They march as soldiers in the military, signifying their ability to think as one. With Jesus as the drill sergeant, they perform the Parable of the Prodigal Son. The cast sings "Light of the World" about Christ's Light and how it shines in each person.

=== Intermission ===
Jesus thanks the audience for coming and announces a 10-minute intermission.

There is audience interaction during intermission. In the original production, the cast joined the audience for wine and bread. In the 2011 Broadway revival, the audience was offered wine onstage.

The second act then opens with one or more cast members singing "Learn Your Lessons Well", calling the audience back to their seats.

=== Act II ===
After the reprise of "Learn Your Lessons Well", a member of the cast sings "Turn Back, O Man", imploring humankind to give up its temporal pursuits and turn to God. Jesus then says: "This is the beginning."

Several members of the cast then begin to question Jesus's authority, and he responds with yet another parable. He is asked, "What is the greatest commandment?" and responds, "You shall love the Lord your God with all your heart and all your soul... And the second is like it: 'You shall love your neighbor as yourself.'" The Pharisees continue to question him, and he laments "Alas for You" and calls them hypocrites. Members of the cast gather, join in Jesus's song, and throw garbage at the Pharisees.

Jesus predicts that he will not be seen for quite a while, while standing at the "Wailing Wall", and predicts great wars and famines. He reminds the cast and audience of the time of Noah and teaches that faith can calm the storm. The cast is told: "Keep awake, then. For the Son of Man will come at a time when you least expect it."

One woman in the cast is shunned as an adulteress. Jesus says: "Let the one of you who is faultless cast the first stone." Her accusers then bow their heads and walk away. Jesus walks over to her and asks: "Woman... where are they now? Has no one condemned you?" The woman answers: "No one, sir." He tells her: "Then nor shall I. You may go, but do not sin again." As she watches Jesus walk from her, she entreats him to remain ("By My Side"). During this song, Judas foretells his upcoming betrayal of Jesus.

In one of the lighter moments in the second act, Jesus tells how he will separate men as a shepherd separates his flock into sheep and goats. The sheep will enter heaven while the goats must suffer eternal damnation. "We Beseech Thee" cry the goats, begging for mercy.

After the song, the cast reminds each other to take things "Day by Day", as they remove their clown makeup, face paint, or object. They assemble for the Last Supper and Jesus tells them that one of them will betray him. Each member of the cast asks, "Is it I?" ending with Judas: "Rabbi... can you mean me?" Jesus tells him to do quickly what he must do and Judas runs off. Jesus breaks the bread and shares the wine, while saying the traditional Hebrew Seder blessings. He tells his followers that they will dine together in the Kingdom of Heaven. The band sings "On the Willows", which is about what has been sacrificed. In the song, Jesus blesses each member of the cast. He asks that they wait for him as he goes into the Garden of Gethsemane to pray.

In the garden, Jesus implores God to let the burden be lifted from his shoulders if there is another way. Jesus returns to his followers to find them all asleep. He begs them to stay awake, but they all fall asleep again and Jesus warns them they will all betray him three times (a reference to the apostle Peter). Jesus then prays to God that if his death cannot pass him by, then His will must be done. He is then tempted by Satan (usually played by the apostles), but orders him away.

Judas returns to betray Jesus, but has a moment where he cannot bring himself to do it. He tries to leave but finds himself boxed in by invisible walls, except for one path which leads to Jesus. Jesus encourages Judas to do what he has come to do, and Judas grabs Jesus to bring him to be crucified. The community starts to attack Judas, while Jesus tells them to stop, as all who live by the sword will one day die by it. Judas (usually alone, as a representation of the others arresting Jesus) ties Jesus upon an electric fence (representative of the cross) as Jesus berates him for arresting him at night, but then says that it had to happen to fulfill the prophets' writings.

The "Finale" begins, loud and in B minor, with Jesus wailing, "Oh, God, I'm bleeding," and the community answers: "Oh, God, You're bleeding." Jesus dies and the music ends. The women of the cast sing "Long Live God", and the men join in with "Prepare Ye the Way of the Lord" in counterpoint. The cast removes Jesus from the fence and carries him out, either offstage or through the aisles. The cast then finishes with a reprise of "Prepare Ye the Way of the Lord".

== Musical numbers ==
=== Off-Broadway production ===
Act I

- "Prologue / Tower of Babble" – Company
- "Prepare Ye the Way of the Lord" – David and Company
- "Save the People" – Stephen and Company
- "Day by Day" – Robin and Company
- "Learn Your Lessons Well" – Gilmer
- "Bless the Lord" – Joanne and Company
- "All for the Best" – Stephen and David
- "All Good Gifts" – Lamar and Company
- "Light of the World" – Herb and Company

Act II

- "Learn Your Lessons Well (Reprise)" – Lamar and Company
- "Turn Back, O Man" – Sonia and Company
- "Alas for You" – Stephen
- "By My Side" – Peggy and Company
- "We Beseech Thee" – Jeffrey and Company
- "On the Willows" – Band
- "Finale" – Company

=== 2011 Broadway revival ===
Act I

- "Tower of Babble" – cast
- "Prepare Ye" – John the Baptist and cast
- "Save the People" – Jesus and cast
- "Day by Day" – Anna Maria and cast
- "Learn Your Lessons Well" – Celisse and cast
- "Bless the Lord" – Lindsay and cast
- "All for the Best" – Jesus, Judas and cast
- "All Good Gifts" – Telly and cast
- "Light of the World" – George and cast

Act II

- "Turn Back, O Man" – Morgan, Jesus, and cast
- "Alas for You" – Jesus
- "By My Side" – Uzo and cast
- "We Beseech Thee" – Nick and cast
- "Beautiful City" – Jesus
- "On the Willows" – Judas and the Band (or ensemble)
- "Finale" – Jesus and cast

=== Tower of Babble ===
"Tower of Babble," the show's opening number, has often been omitted in productions. The song consists of the eight disciples (or soloists) acting out as philosophers, each singing about their various philosophies. They grow increasingly irritated with each other, sing in contradiction, and eventually run out of words. "Prepare Ye" follows this prologue.

In the original productions, the philosophers were Socrates (Jeffrey Mylett), Thomas Aquinas (Peggy Gordon), Martin Luther (Lamar Alford), Leonardo da Vinci (Gilmer McCormick), Edward Gibbon (Sonia Manzano), Jean-Paul Sartre (Joanne Jonas), Friedrich Nietzsche (Robin Lamont), and Buckminster Fuller (Herb Braha). In the 2001 revival, Luther, Gibbon, Nietzsche, and Fuller were replaced by Galileo Galilei, Jonathan Edwards, L. Ron Hubbard, and Marianne Williamson, respectively. The 2011 revival retains Galileo, Hubbard, and Williamson, but restores Gibbon and replaces Leonardo with Georg Hegel.

On many early cast recordings, including the original off-Broadway recording and the original London recording, the prologue was omitted to produce an album that could sell as a pop album. This omission was for marketing purposes and not meant to diminish the number's importance, as Stephen Schwartz has repeatedly said. As a consequence, some audiences have gotten the impression that this number was added later.

=== Beautiful City ===
"Beautiful City" was written in 1972 as part of the film and rewritten in 1993 after the Rodney King riots in Los Angeles. In the film, it follows "Alas for You" and "By My Side", omitting the parable typically found in between these two numbers.

In the decades since the film's release, many directors have chosen to use the lyrics from the original film version, sometimes to replace the "Day by Day" reprise, "Tower of Babble", like the prologue, or adding it the end of the musical as an additional scene depicting the Resurrection.

The 2011 Broadway revival places "Beautiful City" after "We Beseech Thee" and just before the Last Supper, sung by Jesus as a slow ballad. This production used the revised 1993 lyrics and is included on its cast recording, along with a cover by John Ondrasik of Five For Fighting as a bonus track.

Some productions use both the original upbeat film version as a prologue as well as the ballad version, either in its original place just before the Last Supper whereupon the "Day by Day" reprise is used as the Resurrection, or as an epilogue depicting the resurrection itself.

In Music Theatre International's Broadway Junior series, which edits popular musicals to one act appropriate for a middle school cast, "Beautiful City" is included in the show. Godspell Junior contains most of the first act and almost none of the second act. "By My Side" is omitted entirely. "Beautiful City" is placed at the beginning of the second act and is immediately followed by the Last Supper, the Betrayal, and the Crucifixion.

== Production history ==
=== 1970: Carnegie Mellon University ===
John-Michael Tebelak wrote the first version of Godspell as his master's thesis at Carnegie Mellon University. The Carnegie Mellon cast included (listed in speaking order): Andrew Rohrer, Mary Mazziotti, Martha Jacobs, Robin Lamont, Robert Miller, Sonia Manzano, Stanley King, Randy Danson, James Stevens, and David Haskell with original music by Duane Bolick. Ted Danson has mentioned that he was cast in this original production on several occasions but had to leave the production due to a case of Bell's palsy. This version was performed at Carnegie Mellon in 1970 by students from Carnegie Mellon's Theatre Department.

=== 1971: La MaMa and off-Broadway ===
The show was then brought to the attention of producers Edgar Lansbury (brother of Angela Lansbury), Joseph Beruh, and Stuart Duncan by Carnegie Mellon alumnus and associate producer Charles Haid, who wanted to transfer the show to off-Broadway. The show was first produced at La Mama as a play with original music for eight songs by Duane Bolick, Jeffrey Mylett, who added one of his songs ("The Raven and The Swan") and Peggy Gordon and Jay Hamburger, who added "By My Side". The producers then hired Stephen Schwartz, another Carnegie Mellon alumnus, to re-score the show. Schwartz's score incorporated a variety of musical genres, including pop, folk rock, gospel, and vaudeville. "By My Side", written by Carnegie Mellon students Jay Hamburger and Peggy Gordon, was kept from the original score. As in the original score, most of the lyrics not written by Schwartz were from the Episcopal hymnal. The show opened as a musical at the Cherry Lane Theatre on May 17, 1971. It transferred to the Promenade Theatre three months later, and closed on June 13, 1976, after 2,124 performances at the Promenade. This production was directed by Tebelak, and the original cast included Lamar Alford, Peggy Gordon, David Haskell, Joanne Jonas, Robin Lamont, Sonia Manzano, Gilmer McCormick, Jeffrey Mylett, Stephen Nathan, and Herb Braha (Simon). The band included Jesse Cutler on guitar and bass, Richard LaBonte on bass, Stephen Reinhardt on keyboards, and Ricky Shutter on drums and percussion. In late 1971, LaBonte was replaced by bassist Steve Manes when two of the original musicians, Shutter and LaBonte, went with the majority of the original cast to The Mark Taper Forum in Los Angeles to open the show there. With the exception of LaBonte, they all returned to the Promenade in January 1972.

=== 1971: Australia ===
The first production after the off-Broadway show opened at the Playbox Theatre in Melbourne, Australia on November 15, 1971. The cast included Colleen Hewett, Collette Mann, Christopher Pate, and George Spartels. The producers, Aztec Services and Williamson Edgley Theatres, opened a second production in Sydney on April 10, 1972. Peta Toppano, John Waters, and Marty Rhone were in the Sydney production. Melbourne played 504 performances and Sydney played 507 before the two companies went on tour, performing another 700 shows.

=== 1971: London ===
Godspell opened at The Roundhouse theatre in Chalk Farm, London on November 17, 1971. This London production featured Jacquie-Ann Carr, Julie Covington, David Essex, Neil Fitzwiliam, Jeremy Irons, Verity-Anne Meldrum, Deryk Parkin, Tom Saffery, Gay Soper, and Marti Webb. After a successful run at the Roundhouse Theatre, the production transferred to the Wyndham's Theatre, also in London, on January 26, 1972. with Barry Stokes.

=== 1972: Washington, D.C. ===
The Washington, D.C. production of Godspell, at Ford's Theater, ran from 1972 into 1973. The cast consisted of Bartley Braverman, Scotch Byerley, Baillie Gerstein, Tony Hoty, Maggie Hyatt, Doris Jamin, Irving Lee, Dean Pitchford, John-Ann Washingson and Lynne Thigpen.

=== 1972: Chicago ===
The 1972–1973 Chicago production played at the Studebaker Theatre, with a cast of Richard Gilliland (Jesus), Joe Mantegna (Judas), JoAnn Brown-El, Sammy Chester, Karla DeVito, Carol McGill, Jim Parks, Tricia Smith, Dan Stone, and Fran Uditsky.

=== 1972: Toronto ===
The 1972–1973 Toronto production opened at the Royal Alexandra Theatre and was intended to be a run of a few dozen performances for a subscription audience. The cast was drawn entirely from local performers, instead of a touring cast. After an enthusiastic response from the audience, the scheduled run at the Royal Alexandra ended and the show moved uptown to the Bayview Playhouse in Leaside. The Bayview Playhouse production ran until August 1973, with a then-record run of 488 performances.

The Toronto production launched the careers of many actors, including Victor Garber, Eugene Levy, Andrea Martin, Gilda Radner, Dave Thomas, Jayne Eastwood and Martin Short, as well as the show's musical director, Paul Shaffer. Howard Shore played saxophone for this production.

You Had To Be There: How the Toronto Godspell Ignited the Comedy Revolution, Spread Love & Overalls, and Created a Community That Changed the World (In a Canadian Kind of Way), a documentary film by Nick Davis about the 1972 Toronto production, premiered at the 2025 Toronto International Film Festival.

=== 1973: Maseru ===
Godspell opened in Maseru, Lesotho in 1973 and ran for five months. When Des and Dawn Lindberg brought the show to the University of the Witwatersrand (Johannesburg), it was immediately banned on the grounds of blasphemy. The ban was widely recognized as a political response to the depiction of racial mixing, which presented a direct challenge to apartheid in South Africa.

The Lindbergs challenged the ban in the Supreme Court and won their case. As a result, Godspell toured South Africa for two years and opened doors to all races on both sides of the footlights. This production was both a theatrical triumph and a political and legal breakthrough.

=== 1974: Spain ===
A Spanish version debuted in 1974 in the Teatro Marquina, Madrid, produced by Manuel Collado. The libretto was translated by José Luis Martín Descalzo and the lyrics by José María Pemán. It was directed by John-Michael Tebelak himself.

=== 1974: Tehran ===
The Tehran production was staged at the Iran-America Society by the Masquers theater group, under the direction of Pat Zich, with musical direction by Richard and Georgia Bassett. The cast, crew and musicians were drawn from American, British and Iranian students, teachers and expatriates. The production ran for 7 days in April 1974.

=== 1976: Broadway ===
The first Broadway production opened on June 22, 1976, at the Broadhurst Theatre. It was directed by John Michael Tebelak, with Steve Reinhardt as musical director, costumes by Susan Tsu, lighting by Spencer Mosse, and sound by Robert Minor. The opening cast featured Lamar Alford, Laurie Faso, Lois Foraker, Robin Lamont, Elizabeth Lathram, Bobby Lee, Tom Rolfing, Don Scardino, Marley Sims, and Valerie Williams. Kerin Blair, Bob Garrett, Michael Hoit, and Kitty Rea were understudies. The band consisted of Paul Shaffer (keyboards, conductor), Mark Zeray (guitar), Chris Warwin (bass), and Michael Redding (percussion).

The show transferred to the Plymouth Theatre, then to the Ambassador Theatre, where it closed on September 4, 1977, after 5 previews and 527 performances.

=== 1981: La MaMa revival ===
Ten years after the original production of Godspell and twenty years after the theater's founding, the musical was revived at La MaMa Experimental Theatre Club in Manhattan. Tebelak directed the 1981 production, with Robert Stecko as musical directed. The cast included Lamar Alford, Kerin Blair, R. Bruce Connelly, Michael Hoit, Paul Kreppel, Sonia Manzano, Melanie Mayron, Marilyn Pasekoff, Leslie Ann Ray, and Jeremy Sage, with Danny Rutigliano as understudy. John Michael Tebelak then flew to Los Angeles where a west coast tenth anniversary reunion production was staged featuring original cast members Peggy Gordon, Stephen Nathan, Herb Braha, Jeffrey Mylett, Gilmer McCormick and David Haskell, with Marley Sims, Patti Mariano, Jeannie Lange, Bob Garrett and original musical director Stephen Reinhardt.

=== 1988: Off-Broadway ===
The Lamb's Theatre revival ran from June 12 through December 31, 1988. It was directed by Don Scardino, with Steven M. Alper as musical director and Doug Besterman as assistant musical director, and with new musical arrangements by Steven M. Alper and Doug Besterman. Costumes were by David C. Woolard, lighting was by Phil Monat, and sound was by T. Richard Fitzgerald. The cast included Trini Alvarado, Anne Bobby (credited as Anne Marie Bobby), Bill Damaschke, Laura Dean, Angel Jemmott, Eddie Korbich, Mia Korf, Robert McNeill, Harold Perrineau, (credited as Harold Perrineau Jr.), and Jeffrey Steefel.

=== 2000: Off-Broadway ===
Godspell was revived off-Broadway at the York Theatre from August 2 to October 7, 2000. Cast members included Shoshana Bean, Tim Cain, Catherine Cox, Will Erat, Barrett Foa, Lucia Giannetta, Capathia Jenkins, Chad Kimball, Leslie Kritzer and Eliseo Roman.

=== 2001: North American tour ===
From September 29 to June 3, 2001, a production of Godspell toured the United States and Canada. The production was directed by Stephen Schwartz's son Scott Schwartz, while the music was arranged by Alex Lacamoire. The cast included Todd Buonopane, Joseph J. Carney, Jessica Carter, Sharon Francis, Esteban Girón, Sarah Hubbard, Natalie Joy Johnson, Kevin Smith Kirkwood, Lauren Lebowitz, Sal Sabella, and Michael Yuen.

=== 2007: UK tour ===
On 24–29 September at The Palace Theatre, Manchester, and then until 1 December 2007 touring UK, played a Godspell production directed by Paul Kerryson and scored by Stephen Schwartz. The cast included Ryan Molloy, Katy-Jo Howman, Stephen Gately, Tiffany Graves.

=== 2011: Broadway revival ===
The first Broadway revival opened for previews on October 13, 2011, at the Circle in the Square Theatre, and officially opened on November 7, 2011, to mixed reviews. Theatre review aggregator Curtain Critic gave the production a score of 63/100, based on the opinions of eighteen critics. The production featured Hunter Parrish, Wallace Smith, Anna Maria Perez de Tagle, Celisse Henderson, Telly Leung, George Salazar, Morgan James, Uzo Aduba, Nick Blaemire, and Lindsay Mendez, and was directed by Daniel Goldstein, choreographed by Christopher Gattelli, and produced by Ken Davenport. On April 17, 2012, Corbin Bleu took over the role of Jesus. The 2011 cast recording was released digitally on December 20, 2011, and in stores on January 31, 2012. The production closed on June 24, 2012.

=== 2016: São Paulo ===
2016 production of Godspell in Brazil opened at Teatro das Artes, directed by Dagoberto Feliz. It received great reviews such as from O Estado de São Paulo: "Best Off-Broadway from 2016". This production featured Leonardo Miggiorin, Beto Sargentelli, Gabriela Medvedovski, Matheus Severo, Artur Volpi, Juliana Peppi, Rafael Pucca, Nathália Borges, Mariana Nunes, Fernanda Cascardo, Pri Esteves, Pedro Navarro e Adler Henrique.

=== 2020: Berkshire Theatre Group ===
Godspell became the first live show to be approved by the Actors' Equity Association during the COVID-19 pandemic. This production, which was performed in a tent in the Berkshire Theatre Group's parking lot, featured Nicholas Edwards, Tim Jones, Alex Getlin, Michael Wartella, Zach Williams, Dan Rosales, Brandon Lee, Emily Koch, Isabel Jordan, Najah Hetsberger and Kimberly Emmanuel. Instead of the standard opening to the show, which features the song, "Tower of Babble," the actors of the show shared how their lives were uniquely impacted by the pandemic. The show, which had the audience sitting ten feet away from the actors on stage (who were socially distanced themselves) required that every audience member wear a facial covering for the duration of the performance. This production brought up the possibility of more socially distanced theatrical productions in the future. The show ran from August 6, 2020, until September 20, 2020.

=== 2022: Spain ===
In November 2022, Godspell returned to the Spanish stage with a new production directed by Emilio Aragón and produced by Antonio Banderas, in collaboration with Teatro del Soho CaixaBank and Estudio Caribe. The show opened on November 3, 2022, at the Teatro del Soho in Malaga and ran until January 8, 2023. In 2023 Concord Theatricals Recordings released a Spanish cast recording. The album is available on digital platforms and in physical format.

== Adaptations ==
=== Godspell, Jr. ===
Part of Music Theatre International's Broadway Junior series, Godspell Junior is a revised script to be performed by a younger cast. Godspell Junior contains much of the first act and very little of the second. In the hour-long one-act show, four songs are cut: "Turn Back, O Man", "Alas for You", "By My Side", and "On the Willows". "Beautiful City" with updated lyrics is a part of the show, placed at the beginning of the second act, and is immediately followed by the Last Supper, the Betrayal, and the Crucifixion.

=== 1973 film ===
Poster for Godspell by David Byrd in the Cherry Lane Theatre

A film version of the musical was released in 1973, set in modern New York and featuring Victor Garber (from the first Canadian cast) as Jesus, David Haskell (from the original cast) as John the Baptist/Judas, and Lynne Thigpen. Tebelak co-wrote the screenplay and served as creative consultant for the film. The song "Beautiful City" was written for and first included in the film. "Prologue: Tower Of Babel" was omitted, and "Learn Your Lessons Well" and "We Beseech Thee" were reduced to minor interludes. Original cast members Robin Lamont, Gilmer McCormick, Joanne Jonas, and Jeffrey Mylett also appear in the film.

== Controversy ==
The hippie clothing the cast wears in the play has caused some controversy. In his "Notes on the Script" (1999), Schwartz wrote, "There are often misconceptions about the concept of the clown analogy in Godspell. For instance, sometimes cast members are thought to be 'hippies' or 'flower children'. The concept was derived by John-Michael Tebelak from a book by Harvey Cox, a professor at Harvard Divinity School, entitled Feast of Fools."

=== Ending interpretation ===
There has also been controversy over Godspell's lack of any obvious depiction of the resurrection of Jesus. This notably mirrors similar criticism leveled at the 1970 rock opera Jesus Christ Superstar, which also did not directly allude to the resurrection. Rather than depicting the resurrection, the "Finale" of Godspell portrays Jesus dying; to end the show, the cast is typically directed to walk off through the audience, carrying his body above their heads. Schwartz noted in the Music Theatre International script that the moment when the body of Jesus is raised aloft in the finale (at which moment the cast sings "Prepare Ye"), or the curtain call where all, including Jesus, return to the stage, can be viewed as symbolic representations of the resurrection. While Schwartz agrees either interpretation is valid, he argues that showing the event of a resurrection is tangential to the point of the musical: The changes Jesus wrought on the community of his followers is the main thrust of Godspell, not the fate of Jesus himself, Schwartz said:

Over the years, there has been comment from some about the lack of an apparent Resurrection in the show. Some choose to view the curtain call, in which Jesus appears, as symbolic of the resurrection; others point to the moment when the cast raise Jesus above their heads. While either view is valid, both miss the point. Godspell is about the formation of a community which carries on Jesus' teachings after he has gone. In other words, it is the effect Jesus has on the others which is the story of the show, not whether or not he himself is resurrected. Therefore, it is very important at the end of the show that it be clear that the others have come through the violence and pain of the crucifixion sequence and leave with a joyful determination to carry on the ideas and feelings they have learned during the course of the show.

— Stephen Schwartz, Libretto Vocal Book, Godspell (2012 libretto)

Godspell was a successful production that began to break down the barriers between rock and roll and Christianity, much like Jesus Christ Superstar. Despite this, the evangelical community, on the whole, disapproved of the genre's perceived irreverent tone and its neglect of central religious doctrine such as the resurrection and Christ's atonement.

== Awards and nominations ==
=== Original Broadway production ===
| Year | Award ceremony | Category | Nominee | Result |
|---|---|---|---|---|
| 1977 | Tony Award | Best Original Score | Stephen Schwartz | Nominated |
