= Martin Joyce =

English footballer

Personal information
- Date of birth: 24 January 1894
- Place of birth: Jarrow, England
- Date of death: 23 January 1960 (aged 65)
- Place of death: South Shields, England
- Height: 5 ft 7 1/2 in (1.71 m)
- Position: Left back

Senior career*
Years	Team	Apps	(Gls)
1919	Durham City		
1919–1921	Jarrow		
1921–1928	Darlington	166	(0)
1928	Durham City	15	(0)
- * Club domestic league appearances and goals

Martin Joyce (24 January 1894 – 23 January 1960) was an English footballer who made 181 appearances in the Football League playing for Darlington and Durham City in the 1920s.

== Life and career ==
Martin Joyce was born on 24 January 1894 in Jarrow, County Durham. He played football for the newly formed Durham City in the Northern Victory League, a competition designed to fill the half-season gap between the end of the First World War and the resumption of national football in 1919. Ahead of the 1919–20 season, he joined North-Eastern League club Palmers (Jarrow) – renamed Jarrow during the season – where he spent two years.

Joyce signed for Darlington ahead of their debut season in the newly formed Football League Third Division North. Mainly used as backup to the veteran Tommy Barbour in the left-back position in 1921–22, he established himself as first choice halfway through the following season. Displaced by Jack O'Donnell in 1924 before the latter's transfer to Everton, Joyce returned to play his part in the team that won the 1924–25 Third Division North title and gained promotion to the Second Division.

A profile in the Derby Daily Telegraph early in the 1925–26 season described him as "only of medium height and weight, but he takes his position well, and is very resourceful in recovering apparently lost positions", although his kicking "might be a little less erratic", and he had "come on by leaps and bounds" since joining the club. Joyce went through that season as Darlington's only ever-present player as they retained their Second Division status, and appeared regularly in 1926–27 as his team were relegated to the Northern Section, taking his six-year career total with Darlington to 166 Football League appearances.

He was listed for transfer, twice failed to obtain a reduction in the fee, and in January 1928 signed for Durham City of the Third Division North, with whom he finished the season.

The 1939 Register records Joyce as a widower with three children of working age, living in Etal Crescent, Jarrow, and working as a labourer in the shipyards. He died in South Shields General Hospital on 23 January 1960 at the age of 65.

== Sources ==
- Dykes, Garth (2010). Durham City FC in the Football League. Nottingham: SoccerData. ISBN 978-1-905891-42-9.
- Tweddle, Frank (2000). The Definitive Darlington F.C. Nottingham: Soccerdata. ISBN 978-1-899468-15-7.
