= Merrell Jackson =

American actor (1952–1991)

- Born: April 26, 1952; Chicago, Illinois, U.S.
- Died: February 23, 1991 (aged 38); U.S.

Merrell Jackson (April 26, 1952 – February 23, 1991) was an American actor who played one of the apostles in the film Godspell (1973). He sang "All Good Gifts".

== Life ==
Jackson graduated from Chicago's Calumet High School in 1971, where he was a soloist for the a cappella chorus, and had leading roles in two stage productions for which he won the "best actor" award. During his senior year he played King Melchior in a school production of the Christmas opera Amahl and the Night Visitors that was shown on local television TV 26, and was an understudy in the Chicago production of the rock musical The Me Nobody Knows. He also sang in the All-City High School Chorus. In the summer of 1971 he was awarded a scholarship to go to the National Youth Chorus Workshop at Wolf Trap American University Academy for the Performing Arts in Washington, D.C., and was one of 25 selected performing arts students who appeared with Lloyd Haynes on the WMAQ-TV musical special The New Performers: Chicagoland '71. His fellow performers voted him "Best Trouper" among the supporting cast members for which he won a $500 scholarship.

He joined the Goodman Theatre's touring company later in 1971, appearing in the children's musical comedy The Magic Isle. He auditioned for the Chicago production of Godspell in May 1972, but was cast in the movie instead, filming in New York from August to November, 1972. He joined the Chicago production in November, but was called back to New York for additional location shots and then continued in the cast until the show's run ended in August 1973.

Jackson then joined Nell Carter in the Chicago cast of the musical Don't Bother Me, I Can't Cope. He was with the national touring company in Baltimore a year later. While living in New York City, Jackson performed with dance companies, appeared in Broadway musicals, and did commercial spots for 7 Up soft drink. He was also a painter.

He has a child named David Clayton Jackson.

Merrell Jackson died of a sudden heart attack on February 23, 1991.
