= Jeffrey Mylett =

American actor and song writer (1949-1986)

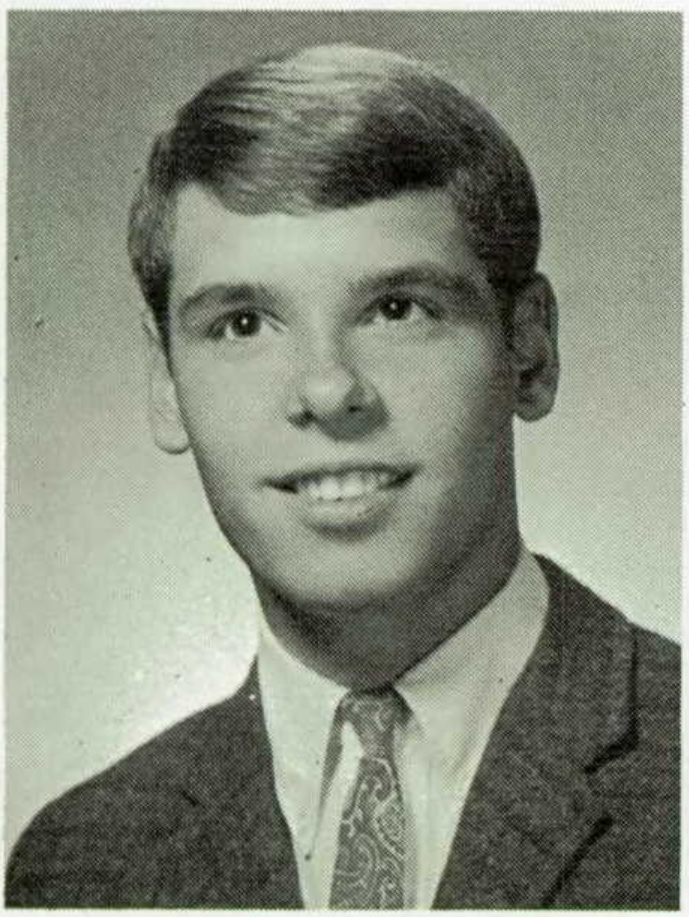
- Mylett's senior portrait c. 1966-1967
- Born: June 8, 1949; North Canton, Ohio
- Died: May 7, 1986 (aged 36); Los Angeles, California
- Occupations: Actor, songwriter

Jeffrey Mylett (June 8, 1949 – May 7, 1986) was an American actor and songwriter. He was best known for his roles in both the stage and film productions of Godspell.

== Personal life ==
Mylett was born in North Canton, Ohio. He attended Hoover High School and studied theater at Carnegie Mellon University.

He followed the spiritual teacher Meher Baba, and he appears in The God-Man, a documentary about Meher Baba produced for Australian television in 1976. In the documentary, Mylett is interviewed and performs his song, "House of the Lord."

Mylett died at the age of 36 in Los Angeles in 1986 as a result of complications of HIV/AIDS.

== Theater, film, and television ==
He appeared in the original off-Broadway production of Godspell in 1971. During the musical's initial two-week run at La MaMa Experimental Theatre Club, the show featured songs by cast members, including two songs by Mylett. A team of producers then transferred the show to commercial theaters and hired Stephen Schwartz to compose a new score. All the original songs were replaced, except for "By My Side" by Jay Hamburger and Peggy Gordon.

Mylett also appeared in Thoughts, written by Godspell castmate Lamar Alford, at La MaMa in 1972 and again in 1973. In 1974, he appeared in the Broadway musical The Magic Show, in which he was Doug Henning's understudy and played Henning's role while he was away. During Mylett's scheduled appearances in the show, the character's name was changed from "Doug" to "Jeff."

In early 1977, he participated in the workshop that created the musical Working. When the show premiered at the Goodman Theatre in Chicago and later on Broadway, the roles Mylett had developed in the workshop were performed by Joe Mantegna.

Mylett recreated his stage role in the 1973 film version of Godspell. He also appeared in the films Money Talks (1972), Brewster's Millions (1985), and My Man Adam (1985).

He hosted The Rock 'n' Fun Magic Show, a 1975 television special featuring music, magic, and comedy. The special featured appearances by Doug Henning, Bill Cosby, and the Hudson Brothers, among others. The series initially intended to follow this special was never produced.
