= Susan Tsu =

American costume designer

Susan Tsu is an American costume designer who, as of 2017, was the Bessie F. Anathan Professor at Carnegie Mellon University and is featured in Who’s Who in Fine Arts Higher Education and Who’s Who of American Women.
