= John-Michael Tebelak =

American dramatist

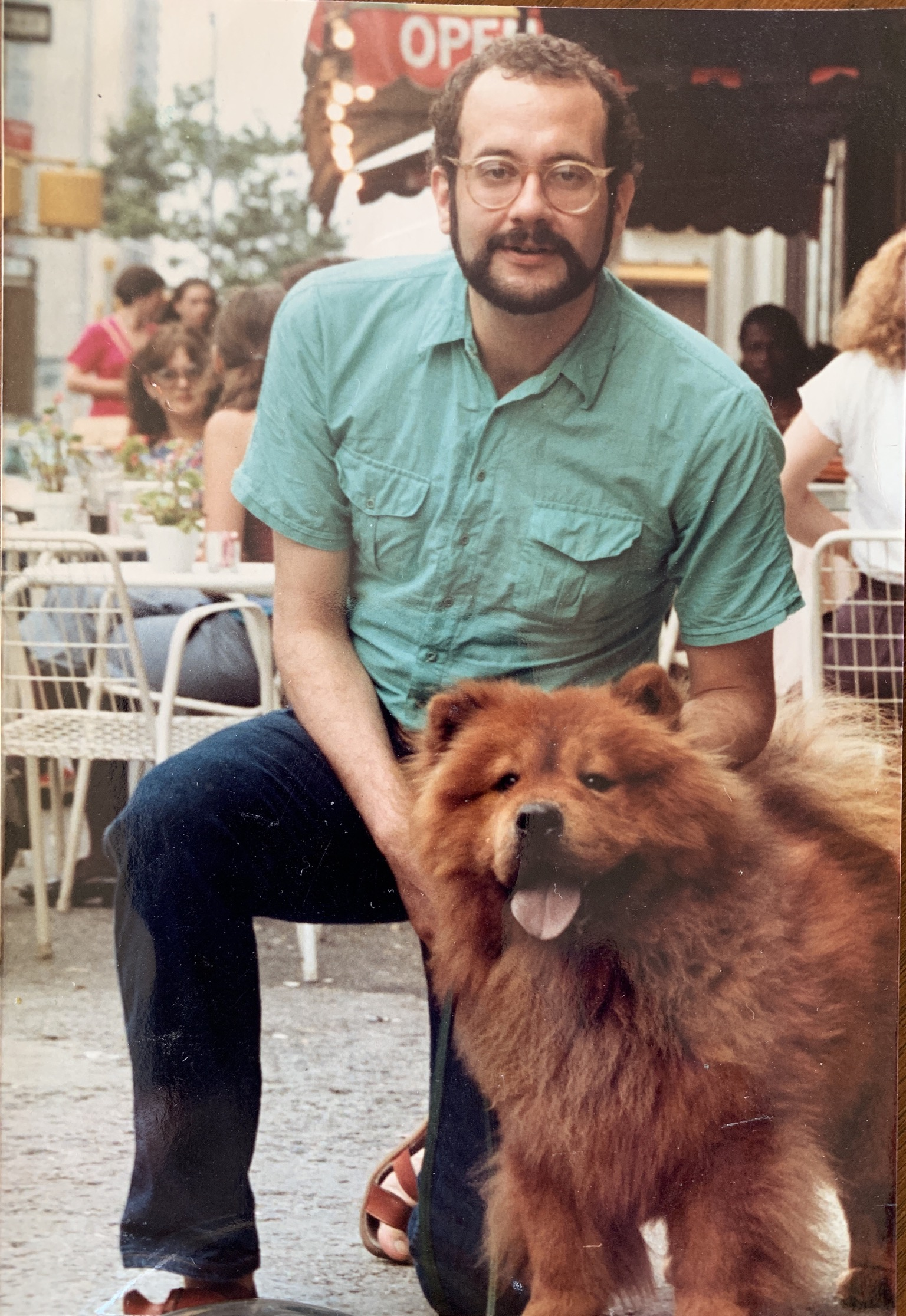
- Tebelak in New York City, 1982
- Born: September 17, 1949; Berea, Ohio
- Died: April 2, 1985 (aged 35); New York City
- Education: Carnegie Mellon University (MFA)
- Occupations: Writer, director
- Writing career
- Notable work: Godspell

John-Michael Tebelak (September 17, 1949 – April 2, 1985) was an American playwright and director. He is best known for creating the musical Godspell, based on the Gospel of Saint Matthew, with the composer Stephen Schwartz, who wrote the music. Some of the lyrics are original to the show, while others were taken from either the Bible or traditional hymns in the 1940 Episcopal hymnal.

== Biography ==
=== Education and Godspell ===
Tebelak was born in Berea, Ohio and graduated from Berea High School in 1966. His parents were Genevieve and John Tebelak, and he had one sister.

He first produced Godspell as his master's thesis, under Lawrence Carra, at Carnegie Mellon University in December 1970. He had been studying Greek and Roman mythology, but became fascinated by the joy expressed in the Gospels, with the deadline for his thesis two weeks away. He attended an Easter Vigil service in 1970 at Pittsburgh's St. Paul Cathedral, wearing his usual overalls and a T-shirt. A police officer frisked him for drugs after the service. He wrote, of this experience, "I left with the feeling that, rather than rolling the rock away from the Tomb, they were piling more on. I went home, took out my manuscript, and worked it to completion in a non-stop frenzy." Though he never completed his coursework at the university, Carnegie Mellon did award him a degree.

He then directed productions of Godspell at La MaMa Experimental Theatre Club, the Cherry Lane Theatre, the Promenade Theatre, and on Broadway. He was named Theatre Man of the Year by Elliott Norton of the Boston Record American, and Most Promising Director of 1971 by the New York Drama Desk. He was also named an Outstanding Ohioan by then-Governor John J. Gilligan. Following the success of Godspell, he contributed funding to a number of productions at La MaMa, including Paul Foster's Silver Queen Saloon (1978); William M. Hoffman's A Book of Etiquette (1978); Steven Margoshes, Gerome Ragni, and James Rado's Jack Sound (1978); Tadeusz Kantor's The Dead Class (1979); Winston Tong in two pieces (1979); Andrei Serban and Elizabeth Swados' Fragments of a Trilogy; Rosalyn Drexler's Vulgar Lives (1979); Meredith Monk's Recent Ruins (1979); and Ron Tavel's Nutrcracker in the Land of Nuts (1979/1980).

=== After Godspell ===
Tebelak directed the Broadway play Elizabeth I in 1972, the off-Broadway play The Glorious Age in 1975, and Ka-Boom! in 1980. He also directed Lope de Vega's Fuenteovejuna in Madrid in 1975. He co-wrote the 1973 film version of Godspell with David Greene.

Tebelak once said that he "walked into a theatre at the age of nine and stayed there." He was a lifelong member of the Episcopal Church, considered becoming a priest, and may have attended an Episcopal seminary for a time. He was dramaturge for the Cathedral of St. John the Divine in New York City and staged liturgical drama there. According to Reverend James Parks Morton, "whether it was a sermon series or a two-day conference on the environment, he turned it into theater."

In 1980, Tebelak was sued in New York State Supreme Court by his former live-in companion, Richard Hannum. Hannum was represented by famed divorce lawyer Marvin Mitchelson, and was working with Norman Mailer on an adaptation of a play about Marilyn Monroe called Strawhead. The lawsuit was an early effort to define the rights of cohabiting homosexual couples.

Tebelak returned to his hometown of Berea, Ohio, to direct the 10th anniversary production of Godspell at the Berea Summer Theater in the summer of 1980. He subsequently directed Cabaret there in the summer of 1981. He directed a revival of Godspell at La MaMa in 1981 and then another revival production billed as the 10th anniversary reunion production in Los Angeles in December 1981 with the majority of his original New York cast. In 1983, he directed Diversions: Or Proof that it is Impossible to Live, based on the life and work of Franz Kafka, written by Aubrey Simpson, and starring Michael Mayer, at La MaMa.

Tebelak died at his home in Manhattan, New York City on April 2, 1985, of a heart attack.

== Filmography ==
| Year | Title | Role | Notes |
|---|---|---|---|
| 1973 | Godspell | Pharisee Monster | (voice role, uncredited) |
