= Day by Day (Godspell song) =

Single by Godspell
- B-side: "Bless the Lord"
- Released: May 1972
- Recorded: 1971
- Genre: Rock
- Length: 3:50
- Label: Bell
- Songwriter: Stephen Schwartz

"Day by Day" is a folk rock ballad from the 1971 Stephen Schwartz and John-Michael Tebelak musical Godspell. It is the third song in the show's score and is reprised as the closing number for the 1973 film version.

== Lyrics ==
The song's refrain follows a prayer ascribed to the 13th-century English bishop Saint Richard of Chichester:

May I know Thee more clearly,
Love Thee more dearly,
Follow Thee more nearly.

The version in Godspell follows more closely the wording in Hymn 429 of the 1940 Hymnal:

Day by day,
Dear Lord, of thee three things I pray:
To see thee more clearly,
Love thee more dearly,
Follow thee more nearly,
Day by day.

"Day by Day" was first a hit in Australia, where both Judy Stone and Colleen Hewett released competing versions of the track in late 1971. Hewett's version reached #2 in the Kent Music Report, while Stone's take reached #25.

In 1972, a version of the song from the album Godspell (1971) by the original off-Broadway cast was released as a single in the US, and attributed simply to the group name "Godspell". Robin Lamont was the lead singer, uncredited. "Day by Day" spent 14 weeks on the Billboard Hot 100, peaking at the #13 position on July 29, 1972. Billboard ranked it as the No. 90 song for 1972.

== Charts ==
=== Weekly charts ===
Godspell

Chart (1972)	Peak position
Canada Top Singles (RPM)	7
US Billboard Hot 100	13
US Easy Listening (Billboard)	8
US Cash Box Top 100	9

Holly Sherwood

Chart (1972)	Peak position
UK Singles (OCC)	29
US Billboard Hot 100	104
US Cash Box Top 100	91

Colleen Hewett

Chart (1972)	Peak position
Australia (Kent Music Report)	2

Judy Stone

Chart (1972)	Peak position
Australia (Kent Music Report)	25

=== Year-end charts ===
Chart (1972)	Rank
Canada	83
US Billboard Hot 100	90
US Cash Box Top 100	66

== Other well-known cover versions ==
- In March 1972, Holly Sherwood released a medley including "Day by Day" as her first single, produced by Tony Orlando for Rocky Road Records. Her version went to number 4 on the US Billboard Bubbling Under the Hot 100 chart, number 91 Cash Box, and number 29 in the United Kingdom.

== In popular culture ==
- In the 2000 film Meet the Parents, Greg Focker (Ben Stiller) is asked by Jack Byrnes (Robert De Niro) to say grace before dinner, resulting in Greg reciting the lyrics from "Day by Day."
