= Lamar Alford =

African-American actor and singer

- Born: Wilkie Lamar Alford; October 11, 1944; Troy, Alabama, U.S.
- Died: March 29, 1991 (aged 46)

Lamar Alford (October 11, 1944 – March 29, 1991) was an American actor and singer.

== Early life ==
Wilkie Lamar Alford was born on October 11, 1944, in Troy, Alabama. He was the youngest of five children (Fletcher, Franklin, Bertha, Stella, and Lamar), and his father was a Baptist minister.

Alford began taking voice lessons in New York City at age 19, and later sang as a tenor with the New York City Opera. Once in New York, he worked extensively at La MaMa Experimental Theatre Club in the East Village of Manhattan. He was a member of the Great Jones Repertory Company, a resident company at La MaMa, during the 1970s. He was also a member of Tom Eyen's Theatre of the Eye Repertory Company.

== Repertory theatre ==
Alford first appeared in a production at La MaMa in 1969. He appeared in multiple Eyen plays that year, including "Four No Plays by Tom Eyen" with the Theatre of the Eye Repertory Company. He also appeared in excerpts from the "Four No Plays" presented alongside excerpts from Why Hanna's Skirt Won't Stay Down and Who Killed My Bald Sister Sophie, both written and directed by Eyen. Eyen dedicated this production to the "West Village raid of June 26, 1969", which would later be known as the Stonewall riots.

He also appeared in Eyen's Caution: A Love Story and Hurricane of the Eye at La MaMa in 1969. That same year, he appeared in Edward de Grazia's The Americans as directed by Martin Brenzell at La MaMa. He also appeared in Donald Julian's In Praise of Folly as directed by Marshall W. Mason and Ching Yeh's Wanton Soup, both at La MaMa in 1969. Alford also wrote the music for Adrienne Kennedy's A Rat's Mass, and appeared in the production at La MaMa in 1969 and again in 1971.

== Acting ==
Lamar made his Broadway debut as Lamar in the 1971 musical Godspell, and sings the solo on the song "All Good Gifts" on the original cast recording.

== Music composer ==
In 1970, he appeared in and composed the music for a production of Arden of Faversham and Alfred Jarry's Ubu as directed by Andrei Serban at La MaMa. That same year, he appeared in and composed the music for Paul Foster's adaptation of Heimskringla as directed by Ching Yeh at La MaMa. He also wrote the music for Antoine Bourseiller's production of Joachim Neugroschel's Baudelaire! at La MaMa in 1970. In April 1970, Alford directed a benefit performance called Bang Too (following a 1965 benefit called BbAaNnGg) at La MaMa. The 1970 benefit featured performances by John Vaccaro's Playhouse of the Ridiculous, Sam Shepard, and O-Lan Johnson, among many others.

== Playwright ==
Alford's own play, Thoughts, was produced at La MaMa in 1972, 1973, and 1974. The 1972 production featured performances by Mary Alice and Jeffrey Mylett, among others. The 1973 production featured a similar cast. Neither Mary Alice nor Mylett appeared in the 1974 production, but Andre de Shields was added to that year's cast. The Jarboro Company took the play on tour to Venezuela in 1974. Alford was also musical director for several productions at La MaMa. These included Wilhelm Pevny's Sprint Orgasmics as adapted by Gitta Honneger and directed by Gotz Fritsch and Andy Robinson's Spring-Voices as directed by Joel Zwick, both in 1969.

In 1975, he appeared in a production of Bertolt Brecht's Good Woman of Setzuan as adapted by Eric Bentley and directed by Andrei Serban, with music by Elizabeth Swados. He appeared in that play again at La MaMa in 1978. He also appeared in Serban and Swados' "Fragments of a Trilogy: The Trojan Women and Electra" at La MaMa in 1978. These Serban/Swados productions were all with the Great Jones Repertory Company.

== Morehouse College ==
In 1982, he became dramatist-in-residence at Morehouse College, a historically black college in Atlanta, Georgia. At Morehouse, he founded the Kings Players, a theatre group.

== Death ==
Alford died at the age of 46 on March 29, 1991, at Crawford Long Hospital.
