= Harsh (given name) =

Harsh is a given name. Notable people with the name include:

- Harsh Chhaya (born 1966), Indian actor
- Harsh Chitale, Indian businessman
- Harsh Gupta (born 1942), Indian earth scientist and seismologist
- Harsh Kumar, Indian ophthalmologist
- Harsh Mahajan (born 1955), Indian politician
- Harsh Mahajan (radiologist), Indian radiologist
- Harsh Mander (born 1955), Indian civil rights activist
- Harsh Mankad (born 1979), Indian tennis player
- Harsh Mayar (born 1998), Indian actor
- Harsh Rajput (born 1987), Indian actor
- Harsh Vardhan (disambiguation), various people
- Harsh Sanghavi, (born 1945) Indian politician
