= Harsh Vardhan =

Harsh Vardhan or Harshavardhan may refer to:

- Harsh Vardhan (Delhi politician) (born 1954), Indian politician who served as Union Minister for Health and Family Welfare
- Harsh Vardhan (Uttar Pradesh politician) (1947–2016), Indian politician
- Harsh Goenka (also known as Harsh Vardhan Goenka, born 1957), Indian industrialist
- Harsh Vardhan Shringla (born 1962), Indian diplomat
- Harsha Vardhan (born 1974), Indian actor in Telugu films
- Harshabardhan, a fictional Indian character created by Shibram Chakraborty
- Harshavardhan or Harsha, 7th-century Indian emperor
- Harshvardhan Chunawala, Indian cybersecurity researcher and technologist
- Harshvardhan Kapoor (born 1990), Indian actor in Hindi films
- Harshvardhan Rane (born 1983), Indian actor in Telugu and Hindi films

== See also ==
- Harsha (disambiguation)
- Harsh (disambiguation)
