= John E. Monnot =

American politician (1865–1910)

Member of the Ohio House of Representatives from the Stark County district
- In office 1888–1892 Serving with George W. Wilhelm and Edward E. Dresbach
- Preceded by: John McBride and Leander C. Cole
- Succeeded by: Benjamin F. Weybrecht and John Thomas

Personal details
- Born: November 30, 1865 Louisville, Ohio, U.S.
- Died: January 7, 1910 (aged 44) Cleveland, Ohio, U.S.
- Resting place: St. John's Catholic Church
- Party: Democratic
- Spouse: Laura M. Barlet (m. 1893)
- Occupation: Politician; lawyer; carpenter; salesman

John E. Monnot (November 30, 1865 – January 7, 1910) was an American politician from Ohio. He was a member of the Ohio House of Representatives, representing Stark County from 1888 to 1892.

== Early life ==
John E. Monnot was born on November 30, 1865, in Louisville, Ohio, to Mary (née Moffatt) and Peter J. Monnot. His father was a French immigrant and worked as a blacksmith and owned a store in Louisville. Monnot grew up in Louisville and attended public and parochial schools there. At 14 years old, he learned the carpenter trade and then worked as a carpenter for several years. He later studied law and was admitted to the bar in March 1887.

== Career ==
After working as a carpenter, Monnot worked at the J. B. McCrea furniture store in Canton for two years. He then worked as a traveling salesman for the Berger Manufacturing Company of Canton. After his admission to the bar, Monnot joined the law firm Case, Monnot, & Whitacre.

Monnot was a Democrat. He was a member of the Ohio House of Representatives, representing Stark County from 1888 to 1892. Due to his young age when elected, Monnot was given the nickname "Young Eagle from Stark County". Monnot served as postmaster of Canton from 1894 to 1898. In 1891, Monnot became secretary of the Canton Board of Trade. He also worked as chairman of the committee of statistics for the board of trade for seven years.

Monnot ran for mayor of Canton twice, but lost. He was also candidate for governor of Ohio. He was one of the organizers of the Canton and Youngstown Railroad.

== Personal life ==
Monnot married Laura M. Barlet, daughter of Peter Barlet, of Canton in 1893. They lived at West Tuscarawas Street in Canton.

Monnot died from pneumonia on January 7, 1910, at Ingleside Hospital in Cleveland. His remains were placed in a vault at St. John's Catholic Church.
