= Harsh =

Harsh may refer to:

- Harsh, Sikar, a village in Rajasthan, India
- Harsh (given name), including a list of people with the name
- Harsh (surname), including a list of people with the name

== See also ==
- Harsha (disambiguation)
- Harshness
