= Edward E. Dresbach =

American politician (born 1863)

Member of the Ohio House of Representatives from the Stark County district
- In office 1890–1892 Serving with John E. Monnot
- Preceded by: John E. Monnot and George W. Wilhelm
- Succeeded by: Benjamin F. Weybrecht, John Thomas, William H. Rowlen

Personal details
- Born: Edward Everett Dresbach; 1863 Pickaway County, Ohio, U.S.
- Party: Democratic
- Occupation: Politician; preacher

Edward Everett Dresbach (born 1863) was an American politician and preacher from Ohio. He served as a member of the Ohio House of Representatives, representing Stark County from 1890 to 1892.

== Early life ==
Edward Everett Dresbach was born in 1863 in Pickaway County, Ohio. He worked on his father's farm until the age of 18. He then attended school in Ada.

== Career ==
Dresbach moved to Wellington and preached there. After one year, he moved to Massillon to take charge of the congregation there.

Dresbach was a Democrat. He served as a member of the Ohio House of Representatives, representing Stark County from 1890 to 1892.

Following his election, his parishioners asked for his resignation. He resigned as preacher on February 1, 1889.
