= Thomas Austin (Ohio politician) =

American politician

Member of the Ohio House of Representatives from the Stark County district
- In office 1896–1896 Serving with George W. Wilhelm
- Preceded by: William H. Rowlen and John Thomas
- Succeeded by: John P. Jones and Jacob B. Snyder

Personal details
- Occupation: Politician

Thomas Austin was an American politician from Ohio. He served as a member of the Ohio House of Representatives representing Stark County in 1896.

== Biography ==
Austin served as a member of the Ohio House of Representatives representing Stark County in 1896. He resigned from the role in August 1896 following his appointment as a trustee of the Cleveland State Hospital, a psychiatric long-term care facility that operated from 1852 to 1975.
