= John Hulst (ship) =

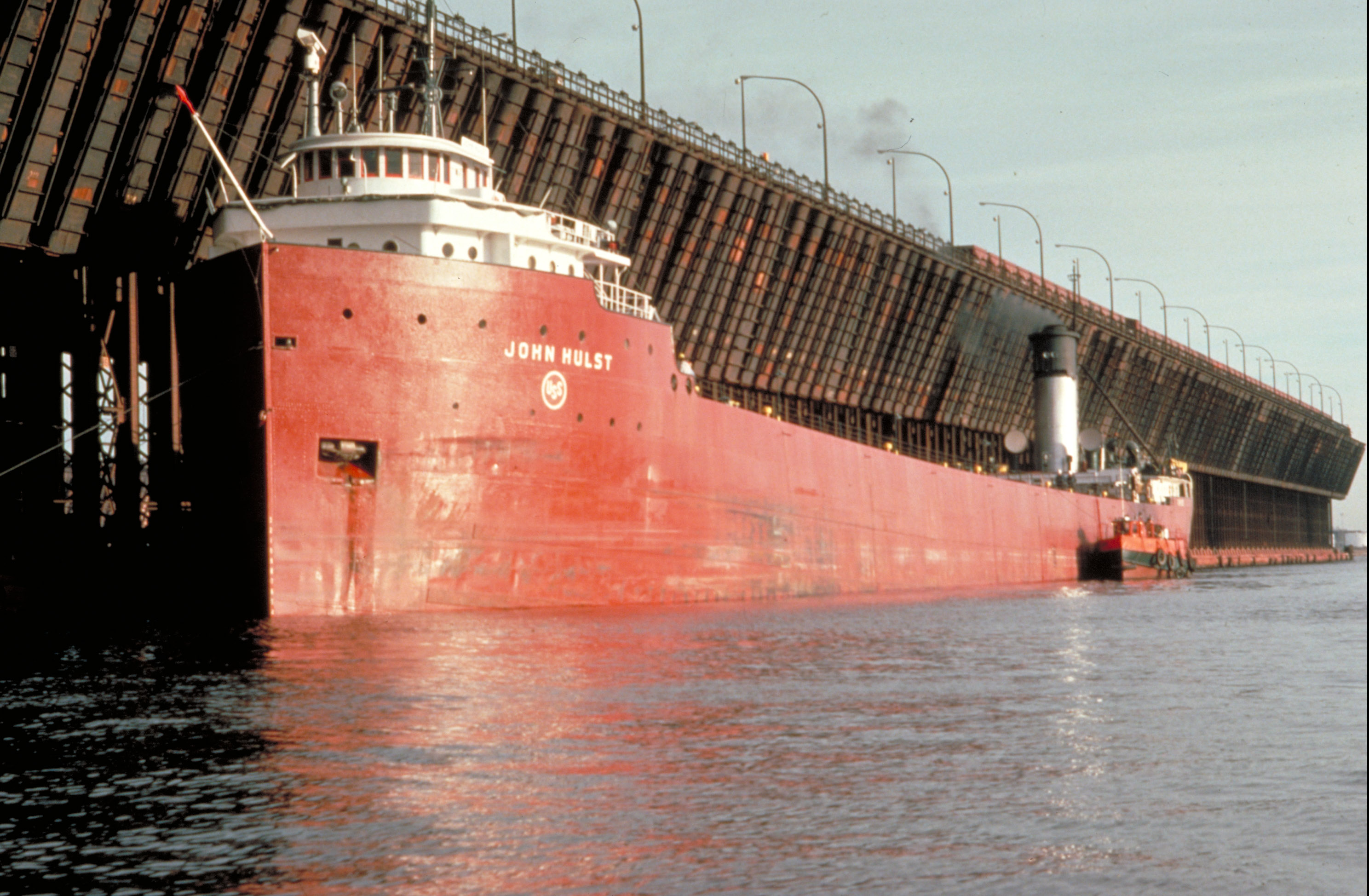
- John Hulst at Duluth Ore Dock. Note the small "U.S.S." for United States Steel.

History

United States
- Name: John Hulst
- Owner: United States Steel Great Lakes Fleet
- Builder: Great Lakes Engineering Works - Ecorse, Michigan, United States
- Launched: Detroit, 1938
- Completed: 1938
- Out of service: 1986
- Fate: Scrapped in 1986
- Notes: John Hulst was not a self unloader. She was also the first steam turbine ship on the Great Lakes.

General characteristics
- Class & type: Bulk carrier
- Type: Cargo
- Tonnage: 8302

John Hulst was a lake freighter. She was one of four vessel of the Governor Miller Class which includes the museum ship SS William A. Irvin. She sailed from 1938 to 1983 and was operated by the Pittsburgh Steamship Company (later United States Steel Corporation.
