= Benjamin Franklin Fairless =

American steel executive (1890–1962)

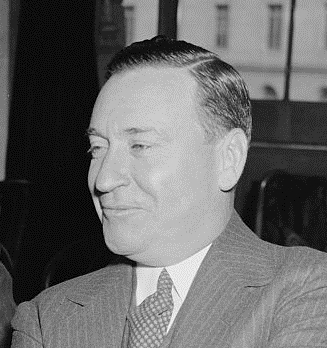
- Fairless in 1939

5th President of U.S. Steel
- In office January 1, 1938 – May 3, 1955
- Preceded by: William A. Irvin
- Succeeded by: Walter F. Munford

Personal details
- Born: Benjamin Franklin Williams; May 3, 1890 Pigeon Run, Ohio, U.S.
- Died: January 1, 1962 (aged 71) Ligonier, Pennsylvania, U.S.
- Occupation: Business executive

Benjamin Franklin Fairless (born Benjamin Franklin Williams; May 3, 1890 — January 1, 1962) was an American steel executive. He was president of a wide range of steel companies during a turbulent and formative period in the American steel industry. His roles included President of Central Alloy Steel from 1928 to 1930; First Vice President of Republic Steel (which had absorbed Central Steel) from 1930 to 1935; President of the Carnegie-Illinois Steel Company from 1935 to 1938; and then President (1938–1955), and later Chief Executive Officer and Chairman of the board of directors (1952–1955) of U.S. Steel, the largest steel corporation in the United States.

Fairless was a well-known humanitarian, and one of the few steel executives willing to allow unionization in the steel industry. He received the Medal for Merit in 1946 for helping to break steel production bottlenecks in the United States during World War II.

== Early life and career ==
Fairless was born on May 3, 1890 in Pigeon Run, Ohio. His father was David Dean Williams, a poor coal miner born in Wales in 1865, and Ruth Wooley Williams, a miner's daughter from Pontypool, Wales, born in 1867. His parents emigrated to the United States in the 1880s, and settled in Ohio. They married in October 1888. Benjamin was their second child; he had an older brother, John, and two younger siblings, Mary Ann and Ralph.

His father was a coal miner and worked summers as a farmer, and the family remained poor. Fairless later recalled that his father repeatedly said the only way to survive in the world was to work and work very hard. His mother was seriously injured in a horse and buggy accident when he was two years old, and he was sent to live with his aunt and uncle, Sarah and Jacob Fairless, in nearby Justus, Ohio. His uncle ran a small grocery store from the front of his home. His relatives adopted him, and he took their last name. (He continued to maintain a home in Justus until the end of his life.) He began selling copies of the Cleveland Press at the age of five to raise money for his family. Fairless remained close to his mother and father, however. He described his father as a happy-go-lucky person who liked almost everyone, and who thought little of walking 10 miles (16 km) on his day off to see his teenage son play baseball. He called his mother "a truly great woman" who had little education but who taught her children the values of honesty, thrift, hard work, and saving.

Fairless was educated in local public schools, and graduated as class valedictorian from Justus High School in 1905. While in elementary and high school, he worked summers for Clark McClintock, a man with a lumber business. Fairless mowed his lawn, took care of his horses, plowed the fields of farms he owned, and did other general jobs for $9 a month (including meals). In high school, he acted as his school's janitor. He arrived early each morning, fired the coal-burning furnace, dusted desks and chairs, swept floors, and shoveled the sidewalks for $65 a year. When his grades began to suffer due to work and lack of attention, McClintock's nephew, Charles Blaine McClintock (whom everyone called "Blaine") began tutoring him. Blaine McClintock encouraged him to go to college, even though Justus High School only provided a three-year program. McClintock helped Fairless obtain a teaching position rather than go into manual labor, which would have ended his aspirations for college. He taught school for three years (1905 to 1908) at Riverdale, Ohio; Navarre, Ohio; and Rockville, Ohio, in order to earn money to pay for summer classes at the College of Wooster in Wooster, Ohio. Having received enough credits to make up for the lacking fourth year of high school, he enrolled at Ohio Northern University in Ada, Ohio. He worked as an assistant in a psychiatric hospital to pay for tuition. He received a bachelor's degree in civil engineering from Ohio Northern in 1913.

In 1912, while still in college, Fairless married Jane Blanche Trubey (sometimes spelled "Truby"). The couple's son, Blaine, was born on June 27, 1913. (Blaine graduated from Babson College, was a lieutenant in the United States Navy during World War II, and later was an electric company executive.) The couple appeared to have marital problems in 1940, and Jane Fairless went to Nevada (at the time, the only U.S. state to offer a quick and easy divorce), but they reconciled in May 1940. She died on September 29, 1942, at the family home in Massillon after a long, unspecified illness. She was buried in Massillon's Rose Hill Cemetery (now Rose Hill Memorial Park).

After graduation from college, he took a job as a surveyor for the Wheeling and Lake Erie Railway. In 1914, Ohio businessman "General" Jacob S. Coxey Sr. decided to replicate his 1894 poor people's protest march and lead a group of unemployed workers to Washington, D.C. When "Coxey's Army" reached Massillon, Fairless resolved to go see the march. Passing by the Central Steel Company plant (then under construction) on a train, Fairless decided not to see the march. Instead, he got off the train, went to the steel plant construction site, and asked the surveying team foreman for a job. He was given a job on the spot. He was promoted from "transit man" (someone who operated a theodolite for the surveying team) to engineer when another person failed to show up for work for a week. After the plant was finished, he was asked to stay on at the steel mill rather than travel to another Central Steel construction site near Chicago.

== Early steel industry career ==
Knowing next to nothing about the manufacture of steel, Fairless spent extra time at the Central Steel plant learning about the manufacturing process and the creation of light alloy steel. He was mentored by F.J. Griffiths, one of two key managers at Central Steel. By 1921, he had been promoted to mill superintendent, general superintendent, and finally executive vice president in charge of operations. In July 1926, Central Steel merged with the United Alloy Steel Corporation. Fairless was made vice president and general manager of the new company, Central Alloy Steel, and in 1928 promoted to president of the firm.

On January 27, 1930, Central Alloy Steel merged with Republic Iron & Steel Company, Donner Steel Company, Trumbell-Cliffs Furnace Company, and the Bourne-Fuller Company to form a new firm, Republic Steel Corporation. Tom M. Girdler, former president of the Jones and Laughlin Steel Company, was named the chairman of the board of directors of the new firm. Fairless was named first vice president of the new company. Over the next five years, Girdler made Fairless his protégé. Fairless became a critical manager at Republic Steel, overseeing executives and operations at Buffalo, New York; Birmingham, Alabama; Canton, Ohio; Chicago; Cleveland, Ohio; Massillon; Moline, Illinois; Pittsburgh, Pennsylvania; Youngstown, Ohio; and Warren, Ohio.

In 1935, the U.S. Steel company, which had lost $130 million from 1932 to 1934 and was just barely breaking even in 1935, approached Fairless with the offer to become president of its newly formed Carnegie-Illinois Steel subsidiary. According to Fairless, Girdler then offered Fairless the presidency of Republic Steel (one of his own positions; the other was chairman of the board of directors) at a higher salary than U.S. Steel was offering. Fairless later said he knew next to nothing about U.S. Steel's operations, corporate or manufacturing structure, or merchandising. But he resigned from Republic Steel effective September 15, 1935, to join U.S. Steel.

== U.S. Steel career ==
=== Carnegie-Illinois Steel ===
On August 28, U.S. Steel announced that it was merging its Illinois Steel (headquartered in Chicago) and Carnegie Steel (headquartered in Pittsburgh) subsidiaries into a single Carnegie-Illinois Steel Company (with headquarters in Pittsburgh), and that Fairless would be president of the new company. On September 17, two more wholly owned subsidiaries, Clairton By-Products and the Lorain Steel Company, were merged into Carnegie-Illinois as well. Fairless assumed the presidency of the new subsidiary on October 1, 1935. Carnegie-Illinois rapidly expanded under Fairless. In December 1935, it opened a $35 million steel works in Clairton, Pennsylvania, and in May 1928 another U.S. Steel subsidiary, American Sheet and Tin Plate Company, merged with it.

During Fairless' tenure as president of Carnegie-Illinois Steel, his company was unionized. The National Labor Relations Act was signed into law by President Franklin D. Roosevelt on July 5, 1935. The Committee for Industrial Organization (CIO) formed as a caucus within the American Federation of Labor on November 8, 1935. The CIO was intent on organizing all workers in a plant (a philosophy known as industrial unionism), while the AFL supported organizing only highly skilled workers along job lines (known as craft unionism). In order to avoid antagonizing the AFL but eager to begin an organizing drive in steel along industrial union lines, the CIO resolved to work through the Amalgamated Association of Iron and Steel Workers ("the AA"), a nearly defunct steel union organized along craft lines. Subsequently, the Steel Workers Organizing Committee (SWOC) was formed in Pittsburgh on June 7, 1936. AFL president William Green was outraged. He denounced what he saw as the takeover of the AA on June 5, and declared that the CIO steelworker organizing drive would fail. More importantly, however, Green interpreted the move as proof that the CIO was engaging in dual unionism. After charges were drawn up and a trial conducted, on September 10, 1936, the AFL suspended the 10 unions which belonged to the CIO—including the AA (which was now operating as part of SWOC) among them. SWOC initially began a heavy organizing drive among steel workers nationwide, employing more than 400 union organizers. But the steel industry responded by almost universally creating "employee representation plans" (ERPs). These ERPs were thinly disguised company unions, and by mid-1935 nearly 90 percent of all workers in the U.S. steel industry belonged to an ERP. U.S. Steel, in particular, saw the ERPs as a legitimate way of learning about employee concerns, and the ERPs in that company began to become more independent. SWOC found little traction in the steel industry, so SWOC focused on gaining control of the ERPs in 1935 and 1936. Fairless was caught in this strategy. In July 1936, he publicly warned his employees against joining "outside unions". So long as the ERPs had not challenged management prerogatives or demanded pay increases, U.S. Steel was content to let them operate, even independently. But in August 1936, the ERP at Carnegie-Illinois demanded a 10 cent an hour pay increase, which Fairless personally denied on September 12. Philip Murray, director of SWOC, said Fairless' actions were not discouraging and predicted that his union would soon have enough power in the ERPs to force management to accept a collective bargaining agreement. Murray proved correct: By early November 1936, Fairless had been forced to schedule a meeting for ERP representatives in the Pittsburgh area to discuss a 10 cent an hour wage increase. By November 10, Fairless had agreed to a cost of living adjustment for 53,000 of Carnegie-Illinois' 100,000 workers. With SWOC continuing to gain strength in Carnegie-Illinois' ERPs, in early January 1937 Fairless established a grievance committee composed of four pro-union ERP representatives with power to hear and adjudicate employee grievances, including the power to chastise managers and recommend punishment. But this failed to blunt the union drive. On February 11, ERP representatives throughout Carnegie-Illinois Steel demanded a $5 per day minimum wage, an 80 cent a day wage increase, and a 40-hour work week.

Events elsewhere forced Fairless' hand. On Saturday, January 9, 1937, CIO president John L. Lewis had a chance encounter with U.S. Steel chairman Myron C. Taylor in the dining room at the Mayflower Hotel in Washington, D.C. The two men talked animatedly at a table for a half hour, then met secretly at the Mayflower over the next two days. Beginning February 17, the two men met secretly for two weeks at Taylor's Upper East Side townhouse in New York City. On Sunday, March 1, Lewis met with Murray, CIO general counsel Lee Pressman, and Amalgamated Clothing Workers of America president Sidney Hillman and told them that Taylor had just signed an agreement agreeing to recognize SWOC as a labor union representing workers at U.S. Steel; bargain collectively with SWOC; establish grievance and seniority procedures; grant an across-the-board wage increase; establish a five-day, eight-hour workwork; and grant time-and-a-half for overtime. Lewis told Murray to appear in Fairless' office on Monday morning, where an agreement would be signed. Murray and Fairless met on March 2, and a recognition agreement was signed that day. Negotiations on additional terms of the agreement began between Fairless and Murray on March 13, and a one-year agreement reached four days later that provided for seniority rights; a week of paid vacation for any worker with more than five years of seniority; two weeks' notice of dismissal; arbitration of grievances; a no-strike clause; and a clause guaranteeing employer neutrality during union elections.

=== U.S. Steel presidency ===
Seven months later, Myron C. Taylor announced he was retiring as chairman of U.S. Steel effective April 4, 1938. Edward R. Stettinius Jr. was named his replacement. Fairless to elevated to the presidency of U.S. Steel effective January 1, 1938. On December 8, U.S. Steel's board of directors agreed to reincorporate as a Delaware company and to move the corporate headquarters from New York City to Pittsburgh. The following day, Fairless was named chairman of the board's executive committee.

In 1938, Fairless' first year as president of U.S. Steel, an indefinite extension was negotiated to the SWOC collective bargaining agreement, effectively preventing a major wage cut at the company. In April, Fairless was also named the chief administrative officer of the company.

The following year, Fairless embroiled U.S. Steel in an investigation into monopolies. The Temporary National Economic Commission, with membership drawn from Congress as well as the Federal Trade Commission, was created in 1938 to investigate monopolies in key sectors of the economy. In November 1939, Fairless admitted to the committee that steel companies often consulted one another when setting prices. His comments ignited a firestorm of controversy. Nathan L. Miller, former Governor of New York and U.S. Steel's general counsel, testified that he had advised the company that such consultations were legal. Fairless and other steel executives hurriedly testified again before the committee, attempting to downplay the nature of these talks. Fairless was called to testify before the committee a third time in January 1940. He successfully defended the steel industry's practice before the committee, although the arguments used would later lead to amendments to U.S. antitrust law.

Fairless was also active in mobilizing the U.S. steel industry for defense purposes during World War II. Initially, Fairless argued against allowing the United States to enter the war in Europe, and believed that the U.S. embargo on steel sales to American allies in Europe should not be lifted. But by February 1941, Fairless had come to see the necessity of rapid expansion of domestic industry to meet the increasingly likely threat of war. He joined with a group of other top steel executives and met with William S. Knudsen, an automotive industry executive who had been appointed Director of the Office of Production Management (a federal agency tasked with promoting defense mobilization). Fairless agreed to increase steel production and devote more steel to defense rather than consumer needs. On February 19, Fairless and Ransom E. Olds (founder of Oldsmobile) met with President Roosevelt in the White House to discuss mobilization needs. In mid-March, Fairless formed and chaired an Iron and Steel Industry Defense Committee to help improve steel and iron production even further. More than 140 steel companies formally joined the committee at its first meeting in May 1941.

Fairless' commitment to defense mobilization led to clashes with labor unions, however. In April 1941, Fairless agreed to a 10 cents an hour wage increase to avert a SWOC strike in steel. But seven months later, Fairless refused to give in when John L. Lewis and the United Mine Workers (UMW) demanded a union shop clause in contracts with mines owned by steel companies. Lewis, who believed that labor standards would be frozen in the forthcoming war, wanted these so-called "captive mines" to grant the union shop as all other mining companies had. Steel company executives resisted this demand for fear they would be forced to grant it in their steel mills as well. Myron C. Taylor, still on the U.S. Steel board of directors, wrote a confidential letter to President Roosevelt offering to agree to the union shop in captive mines but only if Roosevelt issued an executive order or Congress enacted legislation requiring it. His reasoning was that federal action would enable the steel companies to resist agreeing to union shops in steel mills. On September 15, the UMW went out on strike. Lewis agreed to resume work after a week in order to allow the National Defense Mediation Board (NDMB; a federal agency established to provide quick resolution of labor disputes in defense-critical industries) to study the matter. The UMW walked out again on October 28, and two days later Taylor and Lewis agreed to allow the entire NDMB to rule on the issue. But unexpectedly, the NDMB ruled 9-to-2 against the union shop provisions on November 10. Lewis set a new strike date of November 15, and on November 13 Fairless predicted that any coal strike in the "captive mines" would be a short one. Roosevelt summoned Fairless; Eugene Grace, president of Bethlehem Steel; and Frank Purnell, president of Youngstown Sheet and Tube, to the White House on November 14 along with Lewis and two other top UMW leaders. He told them that neither he nor Congress would order a union shop, and asked that work continue in the mines while the two sides negotiated. But Fairless reported that no progress was made, and Lewis threatened to close all coal mines nationwide. Violence between striking miners, law enforcement officials, and miners willing to cross picket lines broke out almost immediately, and some miners in non-captive coal mines walked off the job in solidarity with the steel company miners. Roosevelt asked Lewis to agree to allow the NDMB arbitrate the decision, but Lewis said Roosevelt had shown such prejudicial behavior already that he would not do so. On November 22, Roosevelt asked Fairless, Lewis, and Dr. John R. Steelman (professor of economics and former director of the U.S. Conciliation Service) to form a committee to arbitrate the dispute themselves. Although Lewis knew that Steelman favored the union shop, the steel companies accepted the arbitration agreement without that knowledge. Nonetheless, the government board provided the steel companies with the cover they needed to oppose the spread of the union shop into the steel mills, and steel companies and "captive mine" owners agreed to accept the arbitration panel's decision. The panel voted 2-to-1 (with Fairless still defending the open shop) to grant the union shop on December 7, 1941.

=== World War II ===
December 7, 1941, also proved to be the start of World War II for the United States. During the war, Fairless led U.S. Steel in rapidly increasing production. In 1943, however, the Carnegie-Illinois Steel Company was found to be supplying inferior steel to the United States Navy. The informer was fired by Carnegie-Illinois, and subsequently sued for $2 million under a law enacted during the American Civil War. Fairless angrily defended U.S. Steel from accusations of war profiteering, and announced an investigation into the shipments of inferior steel. Three weeks later, Fairless personally testified before the War Production Board that several managers at Carnegie-Illinois had falsified tests so that inferior grade steel could be sold to the government, and had pocketed the money saved as profits. He said he had fired the individuals responsible.

In October 1943, President Roosevelt asked Fairless to sit on a new advisory panel on eliminating bottlenecks in steel production.

Fairless again confronted the UMW in late 1943. Throughout the year, UMW members had engaged in wildcat strikes against various sectors of the coal industry, demanding wage increases significantly higher than those granted in other industries by the National War Labor Board (which, in exchange for a no-strike pledge by the nation's labor unions, had achieved complete legal authority to approve all union contracts). These strikes, Fairless said, significantly impeded U.S. Steel's ability to meet production goals. Although wage increases were inflationary, Fairless announced on December 8 that he was reopening negotiations with SWOC in order to award a pay increase and attempt to raise production. SWOC asked for back pay to make up for purchasing power lost due to severe wartime inflation. But Fairless refused to consider this request. More than 170,000 SWOC members went out on strike. Fairless gave in to union demands on December 28. Fairless was infuriated by the negotiations and subsequent contract, and in January 1944 said that he favored a return to the open shop as a means of reining in SWOC's power at the bargaining table.

In August 1944, Blaine Fairless wed Caroline Sproul. Less than two months later, Benjamin Fairless married Hazel Hatfield Sproul on October 14, 1944. She was the daughter of Henry D. Hatfield, a physician, former Governor of West Virginia, and former United States Senator from West Virginia. She had only recently divorced John Roach Sproul, son of William Cameron Sproul (a former Governor of Pennsylvania). The couple were married by the pastor of the Shadyside Presbyterian Church at Mrs. Sproul's parents' home in Huntington, West Virginia.

=== Post-war years ===
In 1946, Fairless was awarded the Medal for Merit for advising the United States Army Chief of Ordnance during World War II on how to eliminate bottlenecks in the steel industry. Returning to U.S. Steel, Fairless led the company through yet another major steelworker strike. The United Steelworkers demanded a significant pay increase in order to once more bring pay in line with the heavy inflation brought about by the war. With prices still strictly regulated by the federal government, in November 1945 Fairless refused to grant any pay increase unless the government approved a $2 per ton increase in the price of steel. Secretary of Labor Lewis B. Schwellenbach urged the parties to come to an agreement out of a concern for national security, but Fairless refused without a price increase. Steel industry executives asked the National Labor Relations Board to prevent a strike, but the agency said it lacked the power. The Office of Price Administration on November 24 declined to permit a price increase, arguing it would violate its price regulations. But the union agreed to a 30-day cooling off period, and on December 31 President Harry S. Truman won agreement from Fairless and Murray to establish a fact-finding board to study the issue. One week later, the president conferred with OPA Administrator Chester Bowles, and Bowles agreed to consider a $2.50 per ton increase in the price of steel. But OPA's fact-finding was nowhere near complete. With the steel strike scheduled to begin on January 13, Truman summoned Fairless and Murray to the White House on January 11. Truman convinced Murray to delay the strike one week, but the two sides were still far apart on the pay rise (Murray demanding 19 cents an hour, and Fairless offering just 15 cents an hour). On January 13, Fairless consulted with other steel industry executives about the talks. The following day, Truman indicated publicly that he would approve a $4 per ton price increase, but only if the two sides came to agreement via collective bargaining on a wage increase. Murray indicated he would accept Truman's offer. But Murray also reportedly said that the steel industry was engaged in a "conspiracy" to destroy the labor movement, a statement which outraged Fairless and led to a breakdown in talks. With no resolution, the strike occurred as scheduled on January 19. Fairless denounced the strike as an attack on the president's wartime reconversion program, industry, and the public good. On January 24, Fairless asked the president to call a national wage and price conference covering all major industries to establish new national wage and price levels. But Truman rejected the plan, and reiterated that his basic proposal from January was the only one he would consider. On January 28, Fairless opened talks with the United Steelworkers. As the strike continued into February 1946 without resolution, Congress began holding hearings on the issue. On February 9, Murray testified that Fairless had offered him a 19 cents per hour wage increase on January 12. Congressional and public opinion turned against Fairless, and on February 15 he and Murray agreed to an 18 cent an hour wage increase.

Strikes during and shortly after World War II convinced many in Congress that federal labor law should be amended to prevent these threats to national security. In 1947, Congress passed the Taft-Hartley Act over Truman's veto. The legislation established a National Labor-Management Panel to advise the president on how to avoid major disruptions in critical economic sectors in the future. In December 1947, Truman appointed Fairless to this panel as one of six representatives from industry.

When the 1946 collective bargaining agreement expired in 1949, the United Steelworkers demanded that U.S. Steel provide each worker a pension. The Taft-Hartley Act's provisions permitting an injunction against a strike in an industry critical to national security were invoked an hour after the United Steelworkers walked off the job on July 7. Cyrus S. Ching, director of the Federal Mediation and Conciliation Service, attempted to mediate a solution to the strike, but these talks broke down on July 11. President Truman proposed a 60-day cooling off period, but Fairless rejected it. Fairless proposed a fact-finding board (which had worked in the 1946 strike) and 60-day cooling off period on July 14, and President Truman accepted the plan the following day. As the fact-finding board conducted its hearings, in August Fairless publicly denounced what he called was "dictatorial" governmental regulation of wages and prices. On September 14, the fact-finding board issued its report, and said that U.S. Steel should provide pensions for its workers. Fairless denounced the recommendation as a "revolution" against free enterprise, and rejected the fact-finding panel's report wholesale. Nonetheless, Fairless agreed to attend a mediation session in Washington, D.C., two days later. On September 17, Murray accused Fairless of imposing a double standard on workers when he revealed that U.S. Steel was paying the pensions of its executives. Public opinion turned sharply against Fairless, and with the Taft-Hartley injunction due to expire Murray announced that the union would strike. Fairless opened bargaining with the union, and President Truman won a postponement of the strike until October 1 in order to allow negotiations to bear fruit. But the negotiations did not result in a contract, and the union struck on schedule. Murray announced on October 13 that the union would settle for a pension plan funded by a 29 cents per hour contribution from U.S. Steel. Fairless continued to resist the pension plan idea. But as layoffs spread throughout the steel industry, other steel companies began meeting with Ching to seek a resolution. On October 18, Fairless quietly sent an aide to meet with Ching and to discuss the pension plan proposal. On October 31, Bethlehem Steel reached an agreement with the United Steelworkers that implemented a pension plan. Under pressure to agree to the same terms, Fairless agreed to meet with Ching and Murray. But no agreement was forthcoming. Jones & Laughlin Steel signed a pension plan deal with the union on November 7, and Youngstown Sheet & Tube agreed to the union's terms two days later. With all the other major steel companies resuming production, Fairless set aside his previous opposition to the pension plan and signed with the union on November 11.

Fairless subsequently approved a large increase in the price of steel in December 1949. Fairless was strongly criticized by members of Congress for this price increase, but he defended it as absolutely necessary given the recent wage negotiations. Congress opened hearings into steel industry pricing in January 1950, and Fairless was called to testify. On January 24, Fairless testified that the price increase was caused by the recent collective bargaining agreement. But the pressure on Fairless did not abate. Congress held additional hearings in April. Several members of Congress accused Fairless of being part of an illegal cartel to keep steel prices high, an accusation Fairless categorically denied on April 24. Two days later, however, the United States Department of Justice opened a legal inquiry into interlocking boards of directors in the steel industry. Fairless denounced the inquiry, declaring it an attack on business. Although no legal action was taken against Fairless by the Justice Department, Fairless later called for major revisions in U.S. antitrust law to clarify rules regarding interlocking directorships, price fixing, and other business consultations.

In 1945, when Fairless was still President of USS, he met with a mining engineer named Mack Lake. Lake told Fairless that he believed there was iron ore in Venezuela, south of the Orinoco River. He asked Fairless to subsidize the research for the ore and Fairless agreed. Lake proved there was massive quantities of high grade ore in that area. U.S. Steel bought and developed the Orinoco Ore Mine. Under pressure from the Truman Administration to increase steel capacity as a pre-emptive measure in response to the Cold War, U.S. Steel and Fairless began drawing up plans for a totally new and modern steel mill on the East Coast to take advantage of the Venezuela Orinoco ore. A site was chosen on the east border of Pennsylvania on the Delaware River 30 mile north of Philadelphia, near Morrisville, Pa. Ore ships could steam from Venezuela and up the Delaware to unload without travelling the Panama Canal, saving shipping costs. Ben Fairless oversaw every aspect of the new mill's design and construction. The new Fairless Works was named after him. His daughters and granddaughters helped to christen and start the new Fairless Works on December 11, 1952.

== Retirement ==
In retirement, Fairless remained active in business affairs and public service. In May 1955, he was elected president of the American Iron and Steel Institute. In January 1956, President Dwight Eisenhower named Fairless to the President's Board of Consultants on Foreign Intelligence Activities (a predecessor to the President's Intelligence Advisory Board).

In September 1956, President Eisenhower appointed Fairless chairman of International Development Advisory Board, a new federal commission of leading citizens charged with studying American foreign aid policies and making recommendations regarding its distribution. Over the next four months, Fairless and the other members of the commission traveled around the globe, observing foreign aid projects and interviewing officials in other governments. The advisory board issued an interim report on December 22 that advocated fewer funds but easing restrictions on their use. But when the board's final report came out in March 1957, it backed off the reduction in funds. Rather, Fairless and the advisory board members advocated keeping funding at current levels, easing restrictions on their use, and reducing barriers to international trade to encourage economic growth so that fewer funds would be necessary. Fairless also urged Congress to expand American foreign aid programs to nations which had chosen a neutral role in the Cold War.

== Death and legacy ==
Fairless retired to his home in Ligonier, Pennsylvania. On November 2, 1961, he sued for divorce from his wife on grounds that she had publicly humiliated him and committed "indignities". The divorce was granted in early December 1961. He was hospitalized with pleurisy in mid-November 1961, and died on January 1, 1962, aged 71. His funeral was held at St. Michael's of the Valley Church.

In September 1942, the Pittsburgh Steamship Company named a 639-foot (195 m) Great Lakes ore carrier, the SS Benjamin F. Fairless.

In 1954, the Association for Iron and Steel Technology inaugurated the Benjamin F. Fairless Award in his honor. The American Iron and Steel Institute also created the Benjamin F. Fairless Memorial Medal in his name, its highest award given to a person outside the steel industry.

In 1956, the Stark County Ohio Board of Education merged Navarre-Bethlehem, Beach City, Brewster, Wilmot, and Sugarcreek School Districts into one. It was named the Fairless Local School District, in honor of Benjamin Fairless.

== Bibliography ==
- Apelt, Brian. " The Corporation- A Centennial Biography of United States Steel Corp. 1901-2001" Cathedral Publishing. 2000.
- Brody, David. "The Origins of Modern Steel Unionism: The SWOC Era." Forging a Union of Steel: Philip Murray, SWOC, and the United Steelworkers. Ithaca, N.Y.: ILR Press, 1987.
- Dubofsky, Melvyn and Van Tine, Warren. John L. Lewis: A Biography. New York: Quadrangle/The New York Times Book Co., 1977.
- Garraty, John Arthur. American National Biography. New York: Oxford University Press, 1999.
- Current Biography. New York: H.W. Wilson Co., 1958.
- Fairless, Benjamin F. "'It Could Only Happen in the U.S.'" Life. October 15, 1956.
- Forbes, B.C. America's Fifty Foremost Business Leaders. New York: B.C. Forbes & Sons Pub. Co., 1948.
- Izant, Grace Goulder. This Is Ohio: Ohio's 88 Counties in Words and Pictures. Cleveland: World Publishing Co., 1953.
- The John Fritz Medal. New York: Bartlett Orr Press, 1952.
- Paradis, Adrian A. Opportunities in Part-Time and Summer Jobs. Lincolnwood, Ill.: VGM Career Horizons, 1997.
- Rienow, Robert and Rienow, Leona Train. The Lonely Quest: The Evolution of Presidential Leadership. Chicago: Follett, 1966.
- Phelan, Craig. William Green: Biography of a Labor Leader. Albany, N.Y.: State University of New York Press, 1989.
- Zieger, Robert H. The CIO, 1935-1955. Chapel Hill, N.C.: University of North Carolina Press, 1995.
- Zey, Mary. Banking on Fraud: Drexel, Junk Bonds, and Buyouts. New York: de Gruyter, 1993.

Business positions
Preceded by Irving S. Olds	Chairman of the Board & CEO of U.S. Steel; January 1952 – May 1955	Succeeded by Roger Blough
Preceded by William A. Irvin	President of U.S. Steel; January 1938 – May 1955	Succeeded by Walter Munford
