= Pigeon Run =

Pigeon Run may refer to:

- Pigeon Run (Sullivan Branch), a tributary of Sullivan Branch in Sullivan County, Pennsylvania
- Pigeon Run, Ohio, an unincorporated community
