= Harsha (disambiguation) =

Harsha or Harsha Vardhana (c. 590–647) was an Indian king.

Harsha may refer to:

- Harsha (Chandela dynasty) (ruled c. 905-925 CE), Indian king
- Harsha (Paramara dynasty) (r. c. 949-972 CE), Indian king; better known as Siyaka
- Harsha Pala (ruled 1015-1035 ), Indian king
- Harsha of Kashmir (ruled 1089-1111 CE), Indian king
- Shriharsha, 12th-century Indian philosopher-poet
- Harsha (director) (b. 1980), Indian choreographer and director in the Kannada film industry
- Harsha, a fictional character prortrayed by Ram Charan in the 2009 Indian film Magadheera
- Bill Harsha (1921-2010), American politician
- Harsa, Ottoman name for Al-Kharsa

== See also ==
- Harsh (disambiguation)
- Harsh Vardhan (disambiguation)
- Harcha, type of bread
