= Senator Wilhelm =

Senator Wilhelm may refer to:

- George W. Wilhelm (1847–1902), Ohio State Senate
- Mary Jo Wilhelm (born 1955), Iowa State Senate
