= Benjamin F. Weybrecht =

American politician (1861–1926)

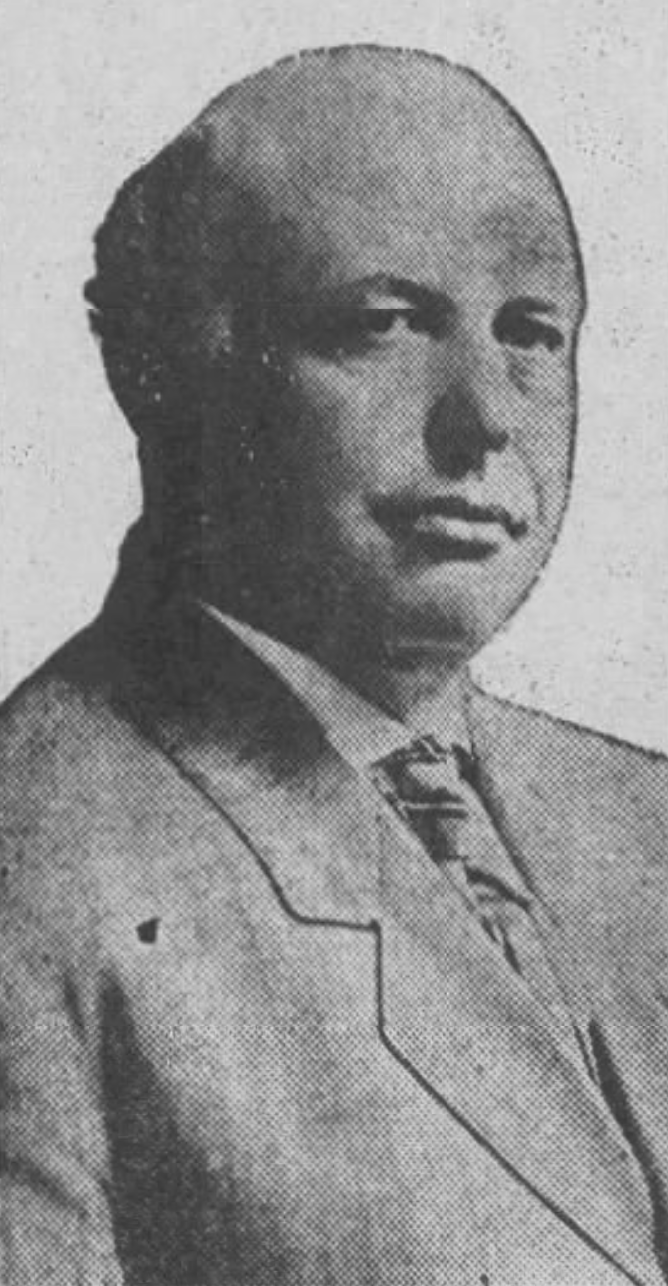
- Weybrecht in a 1912 newspaper

Member of the Ohio House of Representatives from the Stark County district
- In office 1892 – March 16, 1892 Serving with John Thomas
- Preceded by: John E. Monnot and Edward E. Dresbach
- Succeeded by: William H. Rowlen

Personal details
- Born: Benjamin Franklin Weybrecht; March 17, 1861 Alliance, Ohio, U.S.
- Died: April 24, 1926 (aged 65)
- Party: Democratic
- Spouse: Elizabeth A. Peterson (m. 1885)
- Children: 4
- Education: Mount Union College
- Occupation: Politician; businessman

Benjamin Franklin Weybrecht (March 17, 1861 – April 24, 1926) was an American politician from Ohio. He served as a member of the Ohio House of Representatives, representing Stark County for a few months in 1892.

== Early life ==
Benjamin Franklin Weybrecht was born on March 17, 1861, in Alliance, Ohio, to Margaret (née Honaker) and John T. Weybrecht. His father worked as a carpenter, contractor and owned a lumber yard in Alliance. Weybrecht attended public schools in Alliance. He attended Mount Union College until 1878.

== Career ==
Weybrecht worked with his father in his lumber business. In 1890, he became one of the partners of J. T. Weybrecht & Sons. His brother Charles C. was also partner. In 1895, the name of the company was changed to J. T. Weybrecht's Sons following his father's death. The plant was destroyed in a fire in 1913 and was rebuilt.

From 1902 to 1906, Weybrecht was president of the Ohio Association of Retail Lumber Dealers. He was president of the Alliance Clay Products Company and the Lexington Hotel Company. He served as director of City Savings Bank & Trust Company of Alliance and the Lumberman's Insurance Company in Mansfield. He was a member of the commission that erected the city hall of Alliance.

Weybrecht was a Democrat. He served as a member of the city council in 1887. He was elected as a member of the Ohio House of Representatives, representing Stark County in 1891. William H. Rowlen contested the election and Weybrecht served as representative until a House vote on March 16, 1892, replaced him with Rowlen. He ran again for the House in 1893, but lost to Rowlen. He was a delegate from Stark County to Ohio's 1912 constitutional convention.

Weybrecht was a trustee of the Alliance Library Association.

== Personal life ==
Weybrecht married Elizabeth A. Peterson, daughter of John Peterson on December 25, 1885. They had four children, John W. (born 1887), Edgar C. (born 1889), Millicent (born 1892) and Mary (born 1897). His son John died during World War I.

Weybrecht died on April 24, 1926, at the office of his physician.
