= Harshvardhan Chunawala =

- Born: Mumbai, India
- Education: Carnegie Mellon University
- Scientific career
- Fields: Cybersecurity, Cloud computing, and Rovers
- Workplaces: Carnegie Mellon University, SLAC National Accelerator Laboratory

Harshvardhan Chunawala is an Indian-born cybersecurity researcher and technologist specializing in information technology and security. He is noted for his involvement in Carnegie Mellon University's Iris Lunar Rover Mission aboard Peregrine Lander and served as a mission operator for the lunar rover, commanding it over a lunar distance. He also serves as a faculty member of the Xavier Institute of Engineering.

== Early life and education ==
Harshvardhan Chunawala was born in Mumbai, India. He received his Bachelor of Engineering degree in information technology from the Xavier Institute of Engineering in Mumbai and later earned a Master of Science degree in information security from Carnegie Mellon University. During his tenure at CMU, he served as a lead research fellow at the SLAC National Accelerator Laboratory, where he contributed to the Transactive Energy Service System (TESS) project, funded by the U.S. Department of Energy, aimed at advancing grid modernization using cloud computing.

== Career ==
In 2017, Chunawala served as a lead research fellow for Geographic Information Systems at the North East Centre for Technology Application and Reach (NECTAR), part of the Department of Science and Technology, Government of India. Since 2022, Chunawala has been a professor at the Xavier Institute of Engineering.

== Research ==
Chunawala was a mission operator for the Iris Lunar Rover Mission, which was part of the payload aboard the Peregrine Lander launched on January 8, 2024. The Iris Rover was intended to capture scientific images for geological research but remained operational for only 10 days due to a propellant leak in the Peregrine Lander that prevented a lunar landing.

At CMU, Chunawala contributed to the development of Carnegie Mellon Mission Control (CMMC), which will support future space missions from the campus. As a space mission engineering lead at CMU's Information Networking Institute (INI), he created a practicum program to train students in real-world space missions with a focus on cybersecurity and cloud computing.

Chunawala served as research fellow at the SLAC National Accelerator Laboratory for the TESS project, a cloud-based system for grid modernization funded by the U.S. Department of Energy. He worked with David Chassin, senior scientist at SLAC National Accelerator Laboratory, on the TESS project. He researched ways to protect energy data and automated transaction integrity.

Chunawala has also worked with Red Whittaker, the Fredkin professor of robotics at CMU, principal investigator of the Iris Lunar Rover. Whittaker mentored Chunawala and the CMU Iris team during the mission. At the Information Networking Institute (INI) CMU, he worked with Dena Haritos Tsamitis, Director of INI, and David Wettergreen, Director of the Robotics Institute's Ph.D. program. Together, they developed student engagement programs in space missions and cybersecurity training. He also worked with Lorrie Cranor and her research team on data breach notification terminology, a study that was presented at the USENIX Symposium 2022. He also worked with Lorrie Cranor on data breach notification terminology research, presented at the 2022 USENIX Symposium, and with Yuvraj Agarwal and Cranor on the Mites sensor project, designed for environmental data monitoring in buildings.
