= John S. Cock =

American politician and judge (1801–1869)

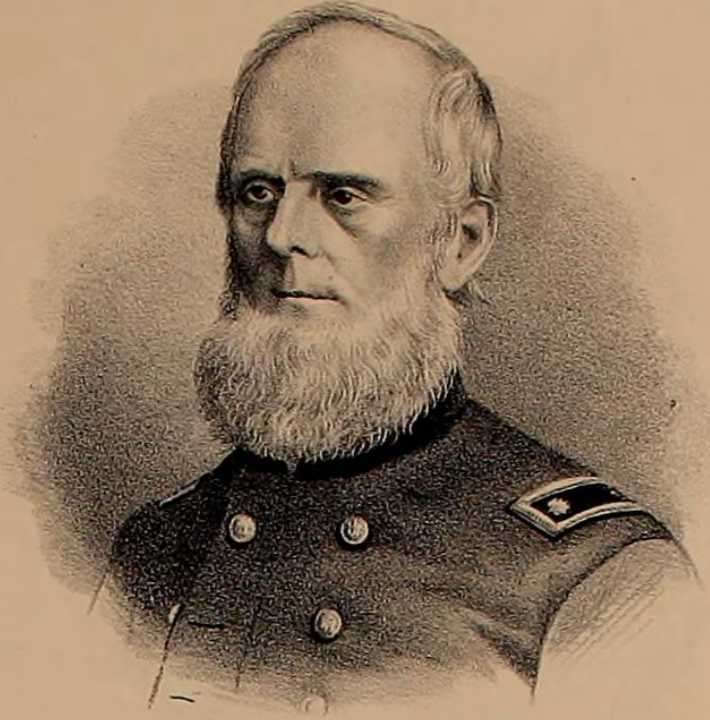
- Drawing of Cock in 1875 publication

Member of the Ohio House of Representatives from the Stark County district
- In office 1846–1848 Serving with George Harsh
- Preceded by: Samuel Stover
- Succeeded by: Benjamin F. Leiter

Personal details
- Born: John Sanderson Cock; March 25, 1801 Brownsville, Pennsylvania, U.S.
- Died: June 20, 1869 (aged 68) Louisville, Ohio, U.S.
- Resting place: Canton Cemetery
- Spouse: Elizabeth McCadden (m. 1822)
- Children: 11
- Occupation: Politician; judge; farmer; tanner

John Sanderson Cock (March 25, 1801 – June 20, 1869) was an American politician and judge from Ohio. He served as a member of the Ohio House of Representatives, representing Stark County from 1846 to 1848.

== Early life ==
John Sanderson Cock was born on March 25, 1801, in Brownsville, Pennsylvania, to Elizabeth (née Moore) and William Cock (1776–1856). His father emigrated from England and his mother was from Mount Holly, New Jersey. His father was a mechanic and worked on steamer ships. As a young man, Cock learned the tanning business from John McCadden.

== Career ==
Cock worked as a tanner for about 20 years. In the spring of 1828, Cock moved to Ohio. He lived in Jefferson County, Ohio, for 21 years before moving to Washington Township in Stark County in 1844 to work as a farmer.

While in Jefferson County, Cock was associate judge of the Commons Pleas Court from April 5, 1836, to March 14, 1843. In 1840, Cock was a member of the state's Board of Equalization.

He was a member of the Ohio House of Representatives, representing Stark County from 1846 to 1848.

During the Civil War, Edwin M. Stanton appointed Cock as paymaster in the U.S. Army. While serving in the war, Cock suffered an accident and became disabled.

== Personal life ==
Cock married Elizabeth McCadden, daughter of John McCadden, of Fayette County, Pennsylvania, on December 25, 1822. They had eleven children, including two that died in infancy, Thaddeus K., Henry, John M. and George B. His son Thaddeus K. died near Vicksburg, Mississippi, during the Civil War. His son George B. served as a major of the 4th Ohio Infantry Regiment during the Civil War and became a physician in Canton after the war.

Cock died on June 20, 1869, at his home in Louisville, Ohio. He was buried at Canton Cemetery.
