= John Thomas (Ohio politician) =

American politician (1857–1936)

Member of the Ohio House of Representatives from the Stark County district
- In office 1892–1896 Serving with Benjamin F. Weybrecht and William H. Rowlen
- Preceded by: John E. Monnot and Edward E. Dresbach
- Succeeded by: Thomas Austin and George W. Wilhelm

Personal details
- Born: December 27, 1857 Syracuse, Ohio, U.S.
- Died: October 30, 1936 (aged 78)
- Resting place: Union Lawn Cemetery; Navarre, Ohio, U.S.
- Party: Republican
- Occupation: Politician; coal miner

John Thomas (December 27, 1857 – October 30, 1936) was an American politician from Ohio. He served as a member of the Ohio House of Representatives, representing Stark County from 1892 to 1896.

== Early life ==
John Thomas was born on December 27, 1857, in Syracuse, Ohio, to Maria (née Raymond) and Jobas Thomas. His father emigrated from Wales and worked as a coal miner. At a young age, his family moved to Newman (then Youngstown Hill), Stark County, Ohio. In 1884, the family moved to Navarre.

== Career ==
Thomas worked in the mines until 1891.

Thomas was a Republican. He served as a member of the Ohio House of Representatives, representing Stark County from 1892 to 1896. In his first chairman, Thomas was chairman of the labor committee. In 1895, he was a candidate for the Ohio Senate, but was defeated during the convention. He was elected as president of the Republican Central Committee of Stark County in 1895. He served in that role until 1896.

In 1898, Thomas was appointed special agent of the U.S. Customs Department. He was transferred to the Special Emigration Department, headquartered in New York. He was promoted as commissioner of emigration at Quebec and held that role from 1901 to 1905. He then moved back to Navarre. Thomas then continued a career in coal.

Thomas was elected mayor of Navarre in 1935. He served in that role until his death.

== Personal life ==
Thomas died on October 30, 1936, at his home. He was buried at Union Lawn Cemetery in Navarre.
