= Thomas W. Chapman =

American politician (1814–1905)

Member of the Ohio Senate from the 21st district
- In office 1858–1860 Serving with Francis J. Myer
- Preceded by: John Beatty
- Succeeded by: George Harsh

Personal details
- Born: June 18, 1814 Brooke County, Virginia, U.S.
- Died: June 16, 1905 (aged 90) Massillon, Ohio, U.S.
- Resting place: Massillon City Cemetery
- Party: Democratic
- Spouse: Rebecca Warner (m. 1836)
- Children: 6
- Occupation: Politician; farmer; breeder

Thomas W. Chapman (June 18, 1814 – June 16, 1905) was an American politician and farmer from Ohio. He was a member of the Ohio Senate from 1858 to 1860.

== Early life ==
Thomas W. Chapman was born on June 18, 1814, in Brooke County, Virginia (later Hancock County, West Virginia), to Elizabeth (née Wilcoxton) and William Chapman. His parents were Presbyterians.

== Career ==
In 1836, Chapman moved to Stark County, Ohio. Chapman owned land in Ashland County, Ohio, for a time. He then moved to Bethlehem Township, Stark County, Ohio, in 1839. His parents followed in 1845. Chapman farmed in Bethlehem Township and bred sheep and horses. For a time, he raised sheep in Illinois with his son. He was president of the Stark County Agricultural Society.

Chapman was a Democrat. He served as a member of the Ohio Senate, representing the 21st district (Stark and Carroll counties), from 1858 to 1860, alongside Francis J. Myer.

Chapman was director of the Wheeling and Lake Erie Railroad.

== Personal life ==
Chapman married Rebecca Warner of Pennsylvania and daughter of George Warner Sr., on June 30, 1836. They had six children, Abraham W., William M., Clara, Maria E., Elizabeth E. and Eva A. His daughter Maria "Mary" E. married Levi S. Smith, a teacher in Stark County. His granddaughter Hattie E. Yost married Ohio state representative Clark W. Metzger. He was a member of the Reformed Presbyterian Church.

Chapman died on June 16, 1905, at his home at 13 Canal Street in Massillon. He was buried at Massillon City Cemetery.
