= Robert A. Pollock =

American politician

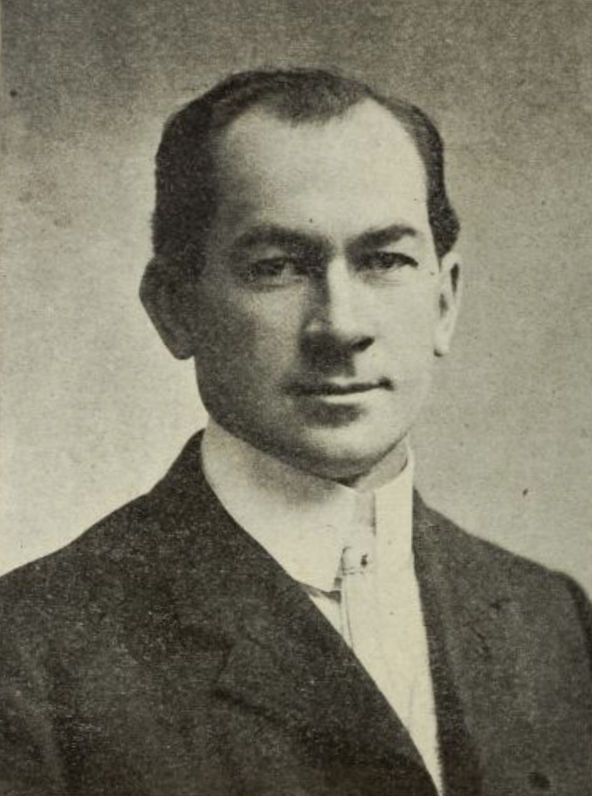
- Pollock in 1908 publication

Member of the Ohio Senate from the 21st district
- In office 1904–1908
- Preceded by: George W. Wilhelm

Member of the Ohio House of Representatives from the Stark County district
- In office 1900–1904 Serving with Jacob B. Snyder and Clark W. Metzger
- Preceded by: Jacob B. Snyder and John P. Jones
- Succeeded by: James A. Welker and Frank A. Hoiles

Personal details
- Born: August 24, 1870 North Lawrence, Ohio, U.S.
- Died: November 13, 1956 (aged 86) Canton, Ohio, U.S.
- Resting place: North Lawrence Cemetery
- Party: Republican
- Spouse(s): Gloria C. Blakely (m. 1901; died 1904) Lillian Violet Lawrence Henrici (m. 1906; died 1916) Gertrude T. Swigar (m. 1918)
- Education: Mount Union College; Northern Indiana Normal School and Business College
- Occupation: Politician; miner

Robert A. Pollock (August 24, 1870 – November 13, 1956) was an American politician from Ohio. He served as a member of the Ohio House of Representatives and the Ohio Senate.

== Early life ==
Robert A. Pollock was born on August 24, 1870, in North Lawrence, Ohio, to Catherine (née Mains) and John Pollock. His father was born in northern Ireland and his mother was born in Scotland. His father worked in the mining industry before working in the mercantile industry and serving as clerk. He also worked as postmaster of North Lawrence. His parents were members of the United Brethren Church. Pollock was homeschooled or public schools, sources differ, until the age of 13. As a young man, he worked in coal mines. He was a member of the executive board of the Ohio Miners' Association. He attended Mount Union College in the summer of 1892, attended public schools in North Lawrence, and, for four months in 1893, took a commercial course at the Northern Indiana Normal School and Business College in Valparaiso, Indiana. He then moved back to North Lawrence and worked for his father in his general store.

== Career ==
Pollock served as justice of the peace for two terms. He was a member of the school board in North Lawrence for two terms.

Pollock was a Republican. He served in the Ohio House of Representatives, representing Stark County from 1900 to 1904. He served as chairman of the committee on geology, mines and mining. He also served in the Ohio Senate, representing district 21 (Stark and Carroll counties) from 1904 to 1908. He was a member of the Ohio School Survey Commission that recommended legislation about schools to the legislature. In 1939, Pollock put forward legislation to investigate "un-American and subversive activities in Ohio" specifically at Ohio State University during the Red Scare. The resolution was later withdrawn in favor of one put forward by H. T. Phillips that didn't mention Ohio University. He served in office until his death, though he lost re-election to Democratic candidate Ed Witmer.

== Personal life ==
Pollock married Gloria C. Blakely, daughter of George E. Blakely, of Doylestown on December 18, 1901. She died in 1904 from typhoid fever. They had one son. Pollock married Lillian Violet Lawrence Henrici, daughter of Charles Henrici, of Canton on January 3, 1906. Pollock married Gertrude. He was a member of the First Methodist Church of Canton. He lived at 2016 Myrtle Avenue NW in Canton.

Pollock died following bronchial pneumonia and a stroke on November 13, 1956, aged 86, at Aultman Hospital in Canton. He was buried at North Lawrence Cemetery.
