= Harsh (surname) =

Harsh is a surname. Notable people with the surname include:

- Frank Harsh (1894–1956), American football and basketball coach
- George Harsh (1810–1897), American politician from Ohio
- Griffith R. Harsh (born 1953), American surgeon
- John Harsh (1825–1906), American politician from Wisconsin
- Leonard Harsh (1801–1866), American politician from Ohio
- Lester Harsh (1910–1994), American politician from Nebraska
- Sabastian Harsh, American football player
- Vivian G. Harsh (1890–1960), American librarian
