= Justus, Ohio =

Unincorporated community in Ohio, U.S.

Coordinates: 40°42′9″N 81°34′48″W

Justus is an unincorporated community in Stark County, in the U.S. state of Ohio.

== History ==
Justus had its start in 1872 when the Wheeling and Lake Erie Railroad was extended to that point. The community was named after William H. Justus, one of the partners of the firm that owned the grain warehouse near the railroad station. A post office called Justus was established in 1874, and remained in operation until 1964.

== Notable people ==
- Benjamin Franklin Fairless, a steel executive, was raised in Justus.
- George W. Wilhelm (1847–1902), store owner in Justus; Ohio state senator and representative
