= William H. Rowlen =

American politician (1852–1901)

Member of the Ohio House of Representatives from the Stark County district
- In office March 16, 1892 – 1894 Serving with John Thomas
- Preceded by: Benjamin F. Weybrecht
- Succeeded by: Thomas Austin and George W. Wilhelm

Personal details
- Born: October 24, 1852 Pickaway County, Ohio, U.S.
- Died: January 1, 1901 (aged 48) Canton, Ohio, U.S.
- Party: Republican
- Spouse: Elizabeth White (m. 1872)
- Children: 6
- Education: Wooster University
- Occupation: Politician; educator; lawyer; insurance businessman

William H. Rowlen (October 24, 1852 – January 1, 1901) was an American politician, educator and lawyer from Ohio. He served as a member of the Ohio House of Representatives, representing Stark County from 1892 to 1894.

== Early life ==
William H. Rowlen was born on October 24, 1852, in Pickaway County, Ohio, to T. A. Rowlen. He grew up on a farm and attended school in the winter. At the age of 14, he received a teacher's certificate. He started teaching at the age of 15. Rowlen graduated from the Lebanon Normal School. He took a postgraduate course at Wooster University. In 1880, he received his teaching license.

== Career ==
Rowlen became the superintendent of schools of Martinsburg, Doylestown, Cuyahoga Falls and Carrolton. He moved to Akron and later Canton. He then worked in the insurance business.

Rowlen was a Republican. He served as a member of the Ohio House of Representatives, representing Stark County. He contested the 1891 election after Democratic candidate Benjamin F. Weybrecht was declared winner. On March 16, 1892, Rowlen succeeded Weybrecht following a House vote. He was then elected in 1893 for a second term, defeating Weybrecht. He then read law and was admitted to the bar.

== Personal life ==
Rowlen married Elizabeth White in 1872 in Defiance County. They had at least six children, including Charles D., May, Fred, Belle, John and Willie. His son Charles worked with Rowlen in his insurance business.

Rowlen died on January 1, 1901, at his home in Canton.
