= William A. Irvin =

American business executive (1873–1952)

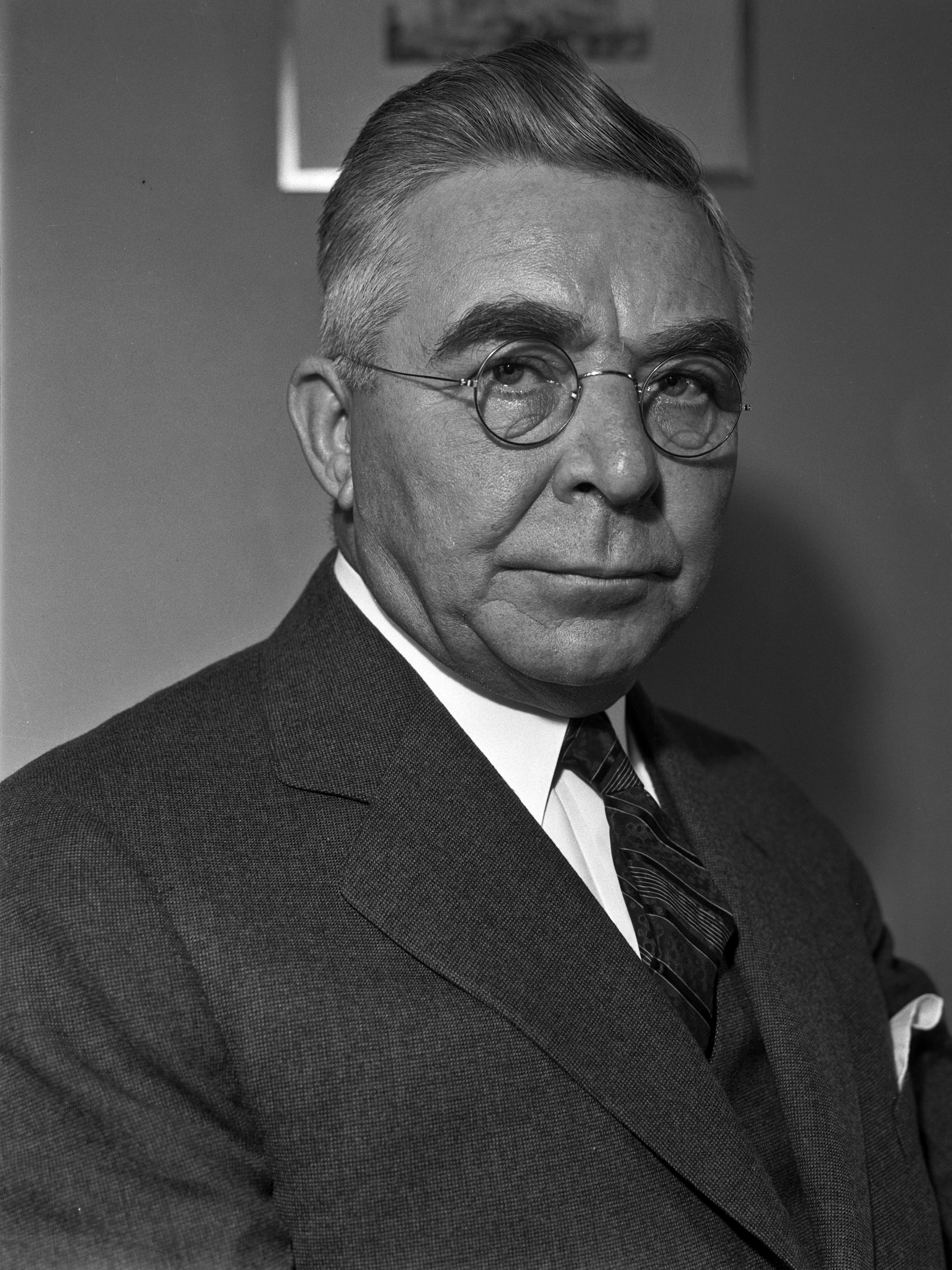
- Irvin in 1935

4th President of U.S. Steel
- In office April 19, 1932 – January 1, 1938
- Preceded by: James A. Farrell Sr.
- Succeeded by: Benjamin Franklin Fairless

Personal details
- Born: William Adolph Irvin; December 7, 1873 Indiana, Pennsylvania, US
- Died: January 1, 1952 (aged 78) Manhattan, New York, US

William Adolph Irvin (December 7, 1873 – January 1, 1952) was an American business executive who served as president of U.S. Steel from 1932 to 1938.

== Biography ==
Irvin was born on December 7, 1873, in Indiana, Pennsylvania, to contractor David S. Irvin Sophia Bergman Irvin; his father was of Scottish descent and his mother of German. He attended night classes at the Indiana State Normal School. In 1888, he was hired as a telegraphist and freight forwarder for the Pennsylvania Railroad.

In 1895, Irvin entered the iron and steel industry, when he was hired as a clerk for P. H. Laufmann Co., based in Apollo, Pennsylvania. In 1900, he was transferred to New York City following Laurmann's acquisition by American Sheet & Tin Plate Co., and in 1904, was transferred to Pittsburgh after a merger. On September 1, 1931, he was named the vice president of U.S. Steel. During a quarterly meeting on October 26, he was elected to succeed James A. Farrell Sr.; he served as president from April 19, 1932, until January 1, 1938. He was described in The New York Times in 1932 as "frank, soft-spoken, but aggressive". When Secretary of Labor Frances Perkins organized a meeting between business and labor leaders, he was the only business leader to attend. He was also a member of multiple professional associations and standards organizations.

Irvin married Luella May Cunningham, having five children together. He later married Gertrude Whitman Gifford, on March 17, 1910. He died on January 1, 1952, aged 78, in the Harkness Pavilion of the Presbyterian Hospital in Manhattan. He is the namesake of the SS William A. Irvin, which was a flagship of U.S. Steel's lake freighters. The ship is now a museum.
