= Clark W. Metzger =

American politician (1868–1946)

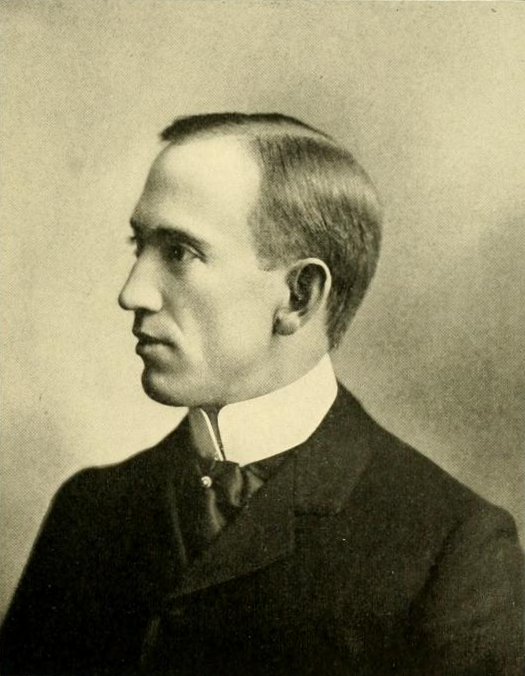
- Metzger in a 1904 publication

Member of the Ohio House of Representatives from the Stark County district
- In office 1900–1904 Serving with Jacob B. Snyder and Robert A. Pollock
- Preceded by: Jacob B. Snyder
- Succeeded by: James A. Welker and Frank A. Hoiles

Personal details
- Born: Clarkson W. Metzger; November 5, 1868 Perry Township, Stark County, Ohio, U.S.
- Died: April 16, 1946 (aged 77) Stark County, Ohio, U.S.
- Party: Republican
- Spouse(s): Ora Martin (m. 1892; died 1893) Hattie E. Yost (m. 1899)
- Children: 2
- Education: Ohio Northern University
- Occupation: Politician; educator; businessman

Clarkson W. Metzger (November 5, 1868 – April 16, 1946) was an American politician from Ohio. He served as a member of the Ohio House of Representatives, representing Stark County from 1900 to 1904.

== Early life ==
Clarkson W. Metzger was born on November 5, 1868, in Perry Township, Stark County, Ohio, to Artie (née Martin) and Adam Metzger. His father served with the 7th Independent Company of Ohio Sharpshooters in the Civil War and worked as a carpenter. He grew up and attended public schools in Richville. He attended the North American Normal School in Fostoria. He then took a course at Ohio Northern University.

== Career ==
In 1887, Metzger started to work as a teacher. He continued that work for 12 years.

Metzger was a Republican. He served as a member of the Republican County Committee for four years. He served as a member of the Ohio House of Representatives, representing Stark County from 1900 to 1904. He served as county treasurer of Stark County for two terms. He was a member of the Stark County board of elections from 1912 to 1928. Metzger managed the campaign of Roscoe C. McCulloch in the 1920 Ohio gubernatorial election.

Metzger was vice president of Smith-Trump Abstract Company. He retired in 1943.

== Personal life ==
Metzger married Ora Martin of Massillon in 1892. She died in 1893. He married Hattie E. Yost, daughter of Oliver Yost and granddaughter of Ohio state senator Thomas W. Chapman, on December 14, 1899. They had two children, Thomas Henry (born 1900) and Nellie Yost (born 1903).

Metzger died on April 16, 1946, at his home in Stark County.
