= Jacob B. Snyder =

American politician and lawyer (1866–1951)

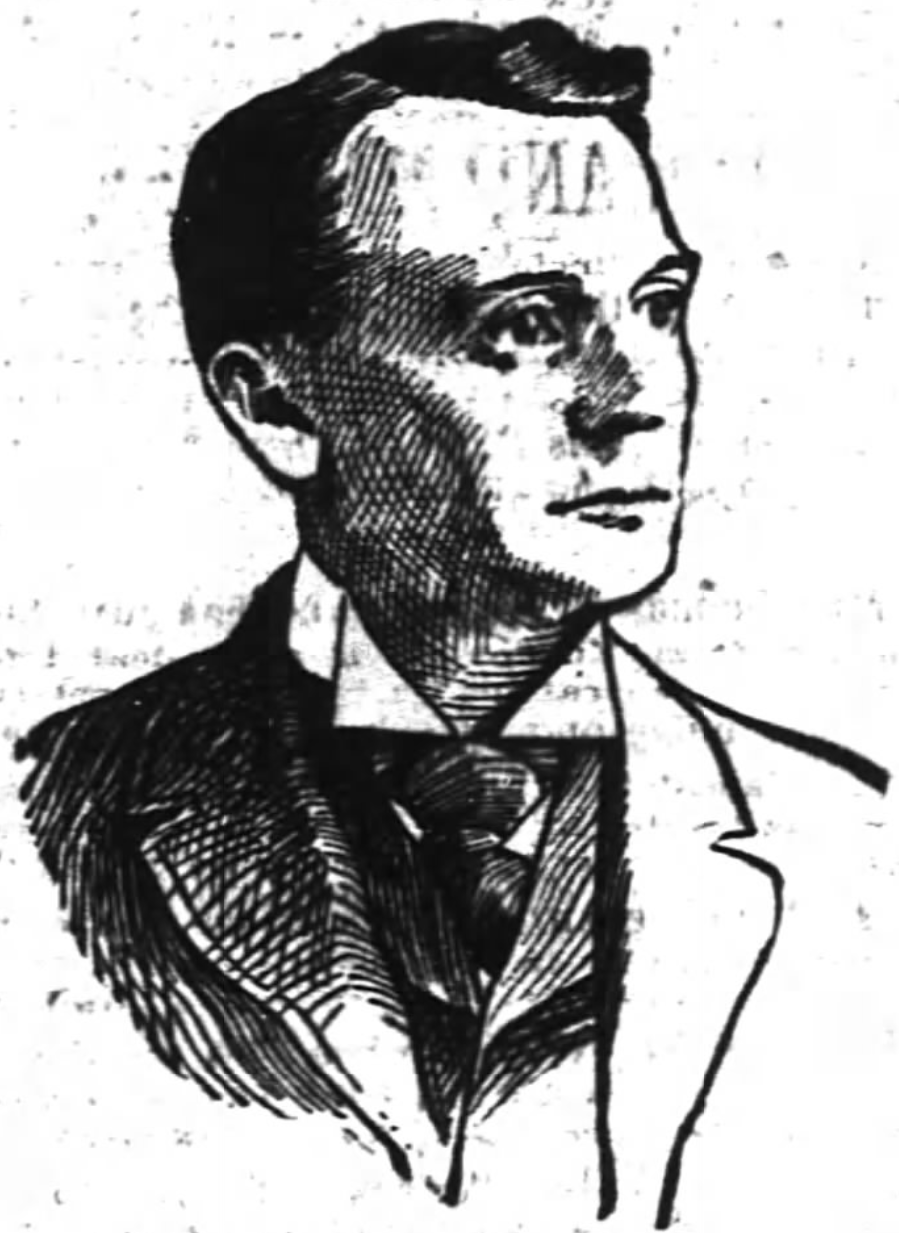
- Sketch of Snyder in 1899 newspaper

Member of the Ohio House of Representatives from the Stark County district
- In office 1898–1902 Serving with John P. Jones, Robert A. Pollock, Clark W. Metzger
- Preceded by: Thomas Austin and George W. Wilhelm
- Succeeded by: R. A. Pollock and Clark W. Metzger

Personal details
- Born: July 2, 1866 near Osnaburg Township, Stark County, Ohio, U.S.
- Died: April 7, 1951 (aged 84) Canton, Ohio, U.S.
- Party: Republican
- Spouse: Alice Steinmetz (m. 1894)
- Children: 2
- Education: Cincinnati Law College (LLB)
- Occupation: Politician; lawyer

Jacob B. Snyder (July 2, 1866 – April 7, 1951) was an American politician and lawyer from Ohio. He served as a member of the Ohio House of Representatives, representing Starrk County from 1898 to 1902.

== Early life ==
Jacob B. Snyder was born on July 2, 1866, at his family's farm near Osnaburg Township, Stark County, Ohio, to Mary (née Bolinger) (died 1897) and Jacob B. Snyder (1826–1891). His father was a farmer. Snyder was educated near Osnaburg. He graduated from the Cincinnati Law College with a Bachelor of Laws and was admitted to the bar in 1892.

== Career ==
At the age of 18, Snyder qualified and taught two winter terms at district schools in the area. In 1889, he was appointed as postmaster of Osnaburg. He served in that role for two years.

After graduating, Snyder worked as a lawyer in Osnaburg for one year. In 1893, he established a law practice in Canton. From 1896 to 1898, he served as the mayor of Osnaburg. Snyder was a Republican. He served as a member of the Ohio House of Representatives, representing Stark County from 1898 to 1902. He ran for speaker of the house, but withdrew from the race. He served as speaker pro tempore of the house from 1900 to 1902. He then continued his law practice in Canton.

== Personal life ==
Snyder married Alice Steinmetz, daughter of George Steinmetz, of Pike Township on November 27, 1894. They had two children, Bernice and Huber. Snyder moved from Osnaburg to Canton in 1899.

Snyder died on April 7, 1951, in Canton.
