= SS William A. Irvin =

Ship launched in 1938

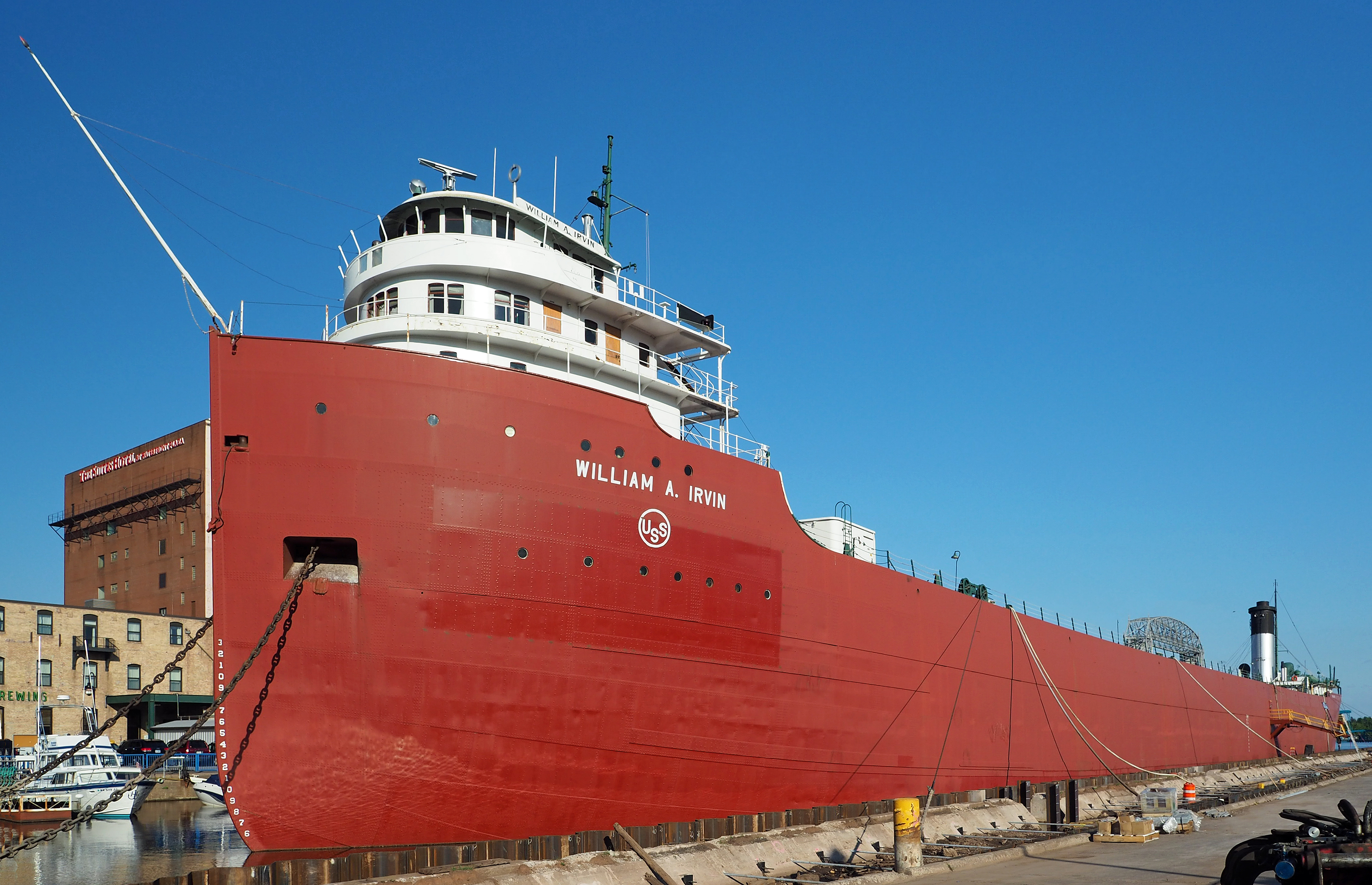
- SS William A. Irvin in Minnesota Slip

History

United States
- Name: William A. Irvin
- Owner: US Steel
- Operator: Pittsburgh Steamship Company
- Builder: American Ship Building Company
- Yard number: 811
- Launched: 10 November 1937
- Sponsored by: Gertrude Irvin
- Maiden voyage: 25 June 1938
- In service: 1938
- Out of service: 1978
- Identification: IMO number: 5390137
- Status: Museum ship

General characteristics
- Type: Laker
- Tonnage: 8,240 gross; 6,072 net
- Length: 610 ft 9.75 in (186.1757 m)
- Beam: 60 ft (18 m)
- Depth: 32 ft 6 in (9.91 m)
- Installed power: DeLaval Cross steam turbine
- Speed: 11.1 mph (9.6 kn; 17.9 km/h) (fully loaded); 12.5 mph (10.9 kn; 20.1 km/h) (empty)
- Capacity: 14,000 tons
- William A. Irvin (freighter)
- U.S. National Register of Historic Places
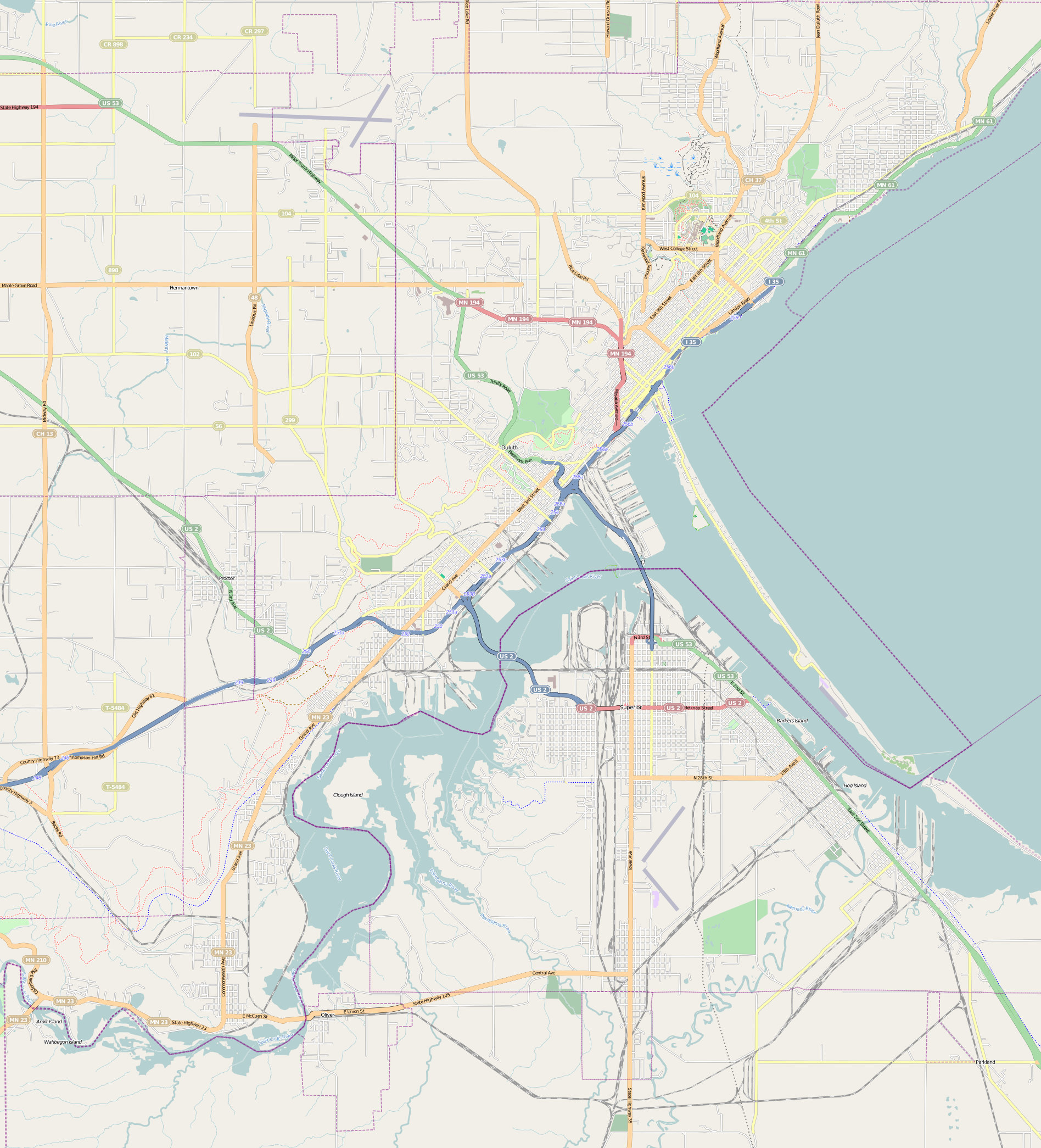
- Location within Duluth Location within Minnesota Location within the United States
- Location: Minnesota Slip in Duluth Harbor, Duluth, Minnesota
- Coordinates: 46°46′58″N 92°5′50″W
- Area: Less than one acre
- Built: 1938
- Built by: American Ship Building Company
- Architectural style: Steel bulk freighter
- NRHP reference No.: 89000858
- Added to NRHP: July 13, 1989

SS William A. Irvin is a lake freighter, named for William A. Irvin, that sailed as a bulk freighter on the Great Lakes as part US Steel's lake fleet. She was flagship of the company fleet from her launch in the depths of the Great Depression in 1938 until 1975 and then was a general workhorse of the fleet until her retirement in 1978.

The ship was refurbished and is moored at Duluth, Minnesota, as a museum ship. SS William A. Irvin is a maintained example of a classic laker, and a example of a straight decker, as she has no self-unloading system.

The ship was listed on the National Register of Historic Places in 1989 for her state-level significance in the themes of engineering, maritime history, and transportation. She was nominated for her role in Great Lakes maritime commerce and for her innovative design features.

The ship has a race named in her honor. Each year since 1994 during the Grandma's Marathon weekend, nearly 2,000 runners compete in the William A. Irvin 5K, which begins and ends at the iconic red hull of the ship.

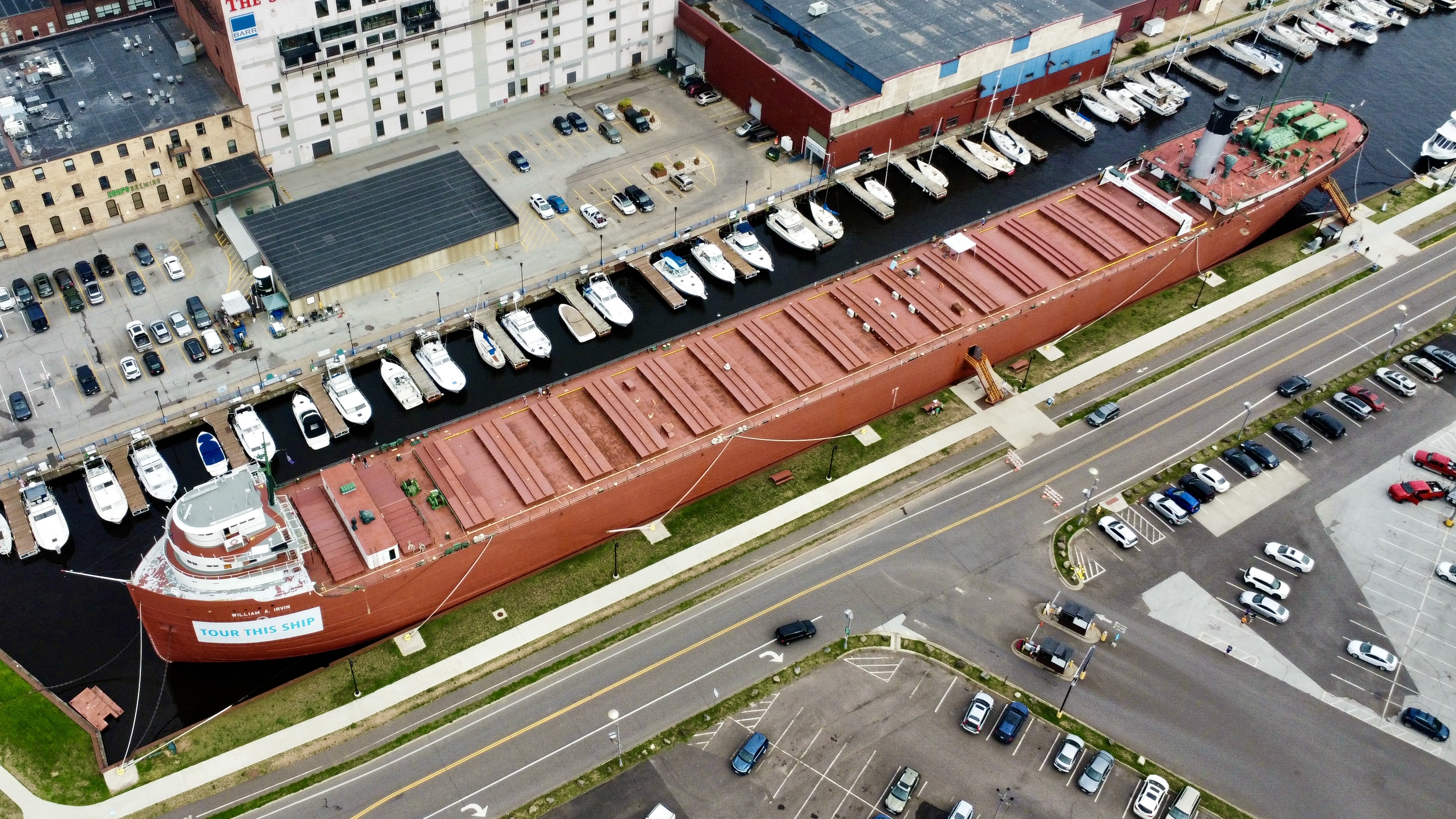

== History ==
SS William A. Irvin was launched 21 November 1937 at the yards of the American Ship Building Company in Lorain, Ohio. Her maiden voyage began 25 June 1938 after outfitting in Lorain. William A. Irvin was the first of a four-vessel class, including Governor Miller, John Hulst, and Ralph H. Watson; each costing about US$1.3 million.

The vessel was christened by William Irvin's wife, Gertrude Irvin. She and her three sister ships incorporated many technological features in their design and proved themselves excellent workhorses. William A. Irvin also hauled many company guests in the ship's luxury accommodations. She steamed for the Pittsburgh Steamship Division of US Steel for her entire career. William A. Irvin is one of few Great Lakes vessels to be retired still holding a Great Lakes cargo record. William A. Irvin had one of the smallest capacities when she entered final layup in 1978 due to the addition of the fleet's first 1,000 feet (300 m) oreboat.

William A. Irvin sat in layup in West Duluth for eight years until the Duluth Entertainment Convention Center purchased her for $110,000 for an addition to their convention center along the Duluth waterfront. William A. Irvin was repainted and sealed up before heading to her final dock near the Aerial Lift Bridge.

She was moved in September 2018 across the bay to Fraser Shipyards in Superior, Wisconsin while environmental work was done in the home slip. On August 1, 2019, she was placed in dry dock for painting and repairs to the portions of her hull normally below the water line.

She was towed back across the harbor on October 16, 2019 and returned to her home behind the Minnesota Slip Bridge.

== Description ==
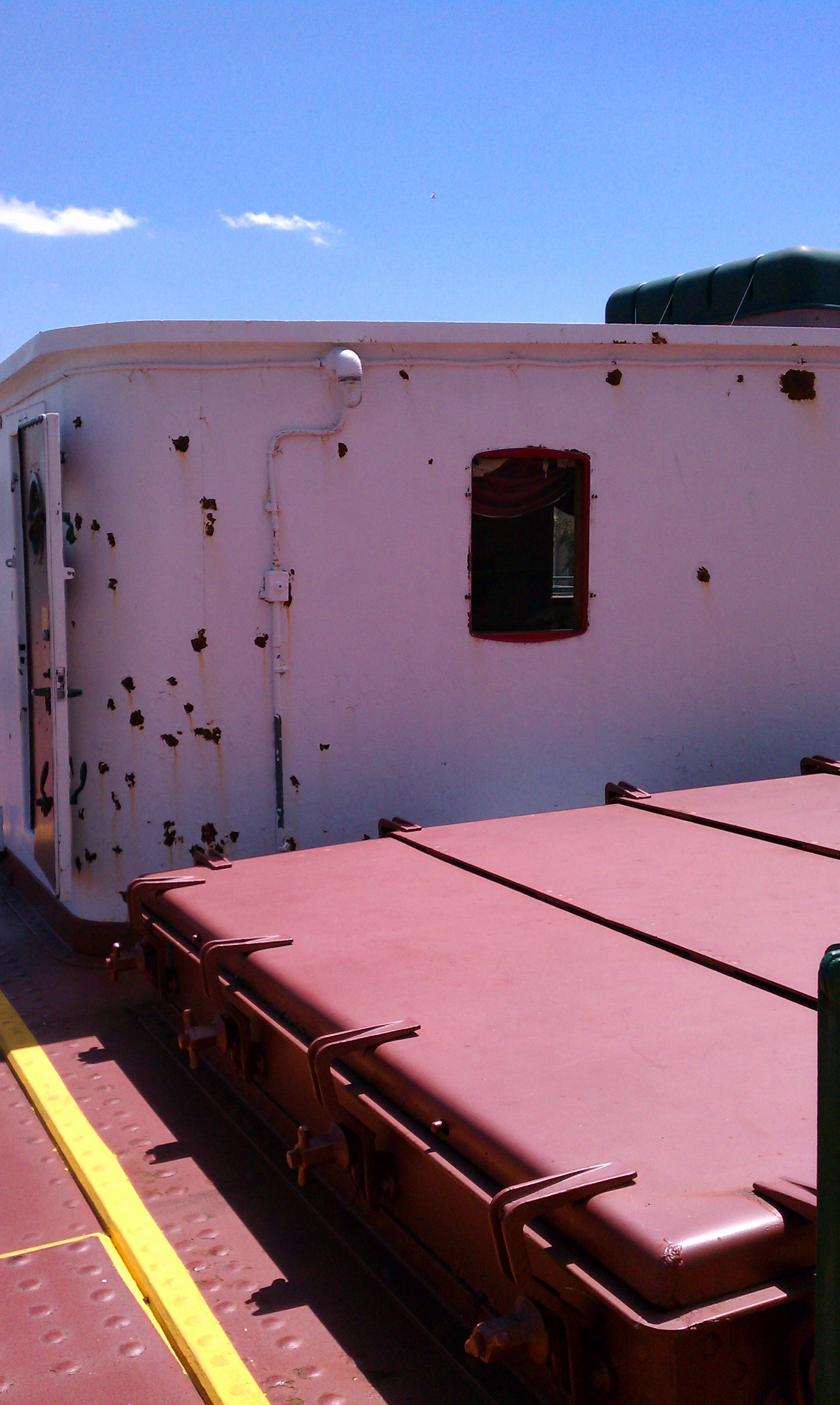
Exterior of the dining room of William A. Irvin

SS William A Irvin 610 feet 9.75 inches (186.1757 m) overall with a beam (width) of 60 feet (18 m) and a depth of 32 feet 6 inches (9.91 m). Her carrying capacity is 13,600 tons. William A Irvin was one of few lakers built with a three-tiered bow cabin, as opposed to the standard two. The extra deck is used to house a suite of four guest cabins and a guest lounge. Also a part of the guest accommodations was a guest dining room located where the number two hatch would be on most lakers. Those parts of the boat are trimmed in oak paneling and walnut veneer with brass handrailings. William A Irvin and her sisters were some of the first to be powered by DeLaval Cross steam turbines as opposed to the standard reciprocating triple expansion steam engines. William A Irvin also included welding in much of her construction and was also the first to have all areas of the ship accessible from the interior of the ship which allowed the boat's crew to stay inside during rough weather.

All parts of William A Irvin, from the woodwork in the guest quarters to the brass in the engine room, have been well cared for.

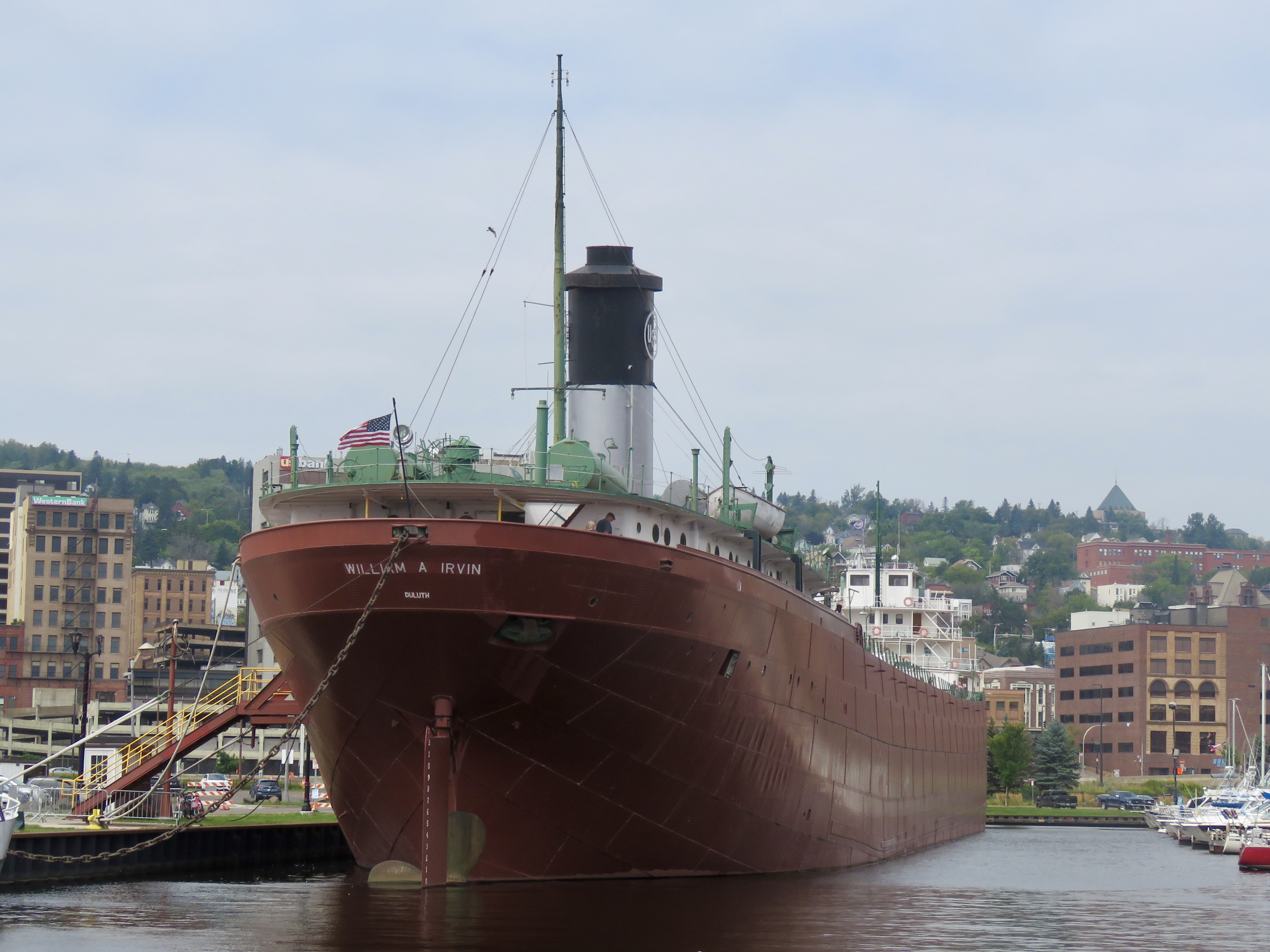

== William A Irvin ==
William A. Irvin was the fourth president of US Steel, as well as chairman of the board. He was born to parents David S. Irvin; a contractor; and Sophia Bergman Irvin in Indiana, Pennsylvania. William dropped out of school at the end of eighth grade because of his father's death. He got a job as a telegraph operator for the Pennsylvania Railroad to support his mother and brother. He eventually worked as a shipping and freight clerk for the same railroad.

Irvin moved from the railroad industry to the steel industry in 1895, working as a shipping clerk for Apollo, Pennsylvania's Apollo Steel Company. Apollo merged with the American Sheet and Tin Plate Company, and by 1904 Irvin was the assistant to the Vice President. He was the Vice President of Operations from 1924 to 1931, when Irvin joined United States Steel Corp. He became president of USS in 1932, and Vice-Chairman of the board in 1938.

Irvin married Luella May Cunningham, the daughter of one of the richest families in his hometown of Indiana, Pennsylvania. Over nine years, they had five children named Martha, Mildred, Louise, William, William Archibald, and Alice. Luella passed away while giving birth to Alice, but Irvin quickly remarried. Irvin was wed to Emma Gertrude Gifford of Denver, Colorado in 1910.

His namesake freighter was launched in 1938, and William and Gertrude were the first guests to sail aboard.

== Loading and unloading ==
William A Irvin could carry up to 14,000 tons of iron ore in either the processed taconite form, or the raw iron ore straight from the mines. About 90% of what she carried was taconite, although she did switch to coal and limestone for periods of time. William A Irvin was equipped to carry grain, although she never did due to the problems associated with switching cargoes from taconite to grain. All cargo was loaded and unloaded through the 18 hatches on deck. All but the forward 2 hatches were covered with large one-piece steel hatch covers, each of which weighed 5.5 tons. After the covers were lifted off and placed aside using the hatch crane, the cargo could be dumped into the three holds, which would normally take 3–4 hours to complete. The 2 forward most hatches were of the older sliding type due to the existence of the guests galley, which precluded the hatch crane from being able to roll all the way forward. They were unloaded used Hulett cranes, which reached into the bottom of the holds and grab 10-15 tons per bite, much like a large playground crane. After all the cargo was either in or out of the holds, the hatch covers would be replaced and clamped down using the dog-ear or butterfly clamps. Although the covers needed a crane to move them, they would need to be secured to ensure that they would not be dislodged by waves washing the decks during storms.

== Engine room ==
William A Irvin is powered by geared steam-turbine engines, rather than the gigantic, two-story tall reciprocating engines used in older ore-carrying ships of the period. The steam from the boiler room at the front of the engine room, came from a gravity-fed coal-burning boiler. The coal bunker is directly above the boiler room, carrying up to 266 tons of coal. This coal drops down to the twin-arm Firite spreaders, burning 1.2 tons of coal per hour to get the steam.

The steam enters the first (high pressure) turbine, turning the shaft at 5,600 rpm. A reduction gear turns the propeller at 90 rpm. The second (low pressure) turbine extracts additional power from waste steam from the high-pressure turbine, and their combined 2,000 horsepower (1,500 kW) would move William A Irvin around the lakes at 11.1 mph (9.6 kn; 17.9 km/h) fully loaded. Empty, William A Irvin would steam at 12.5 mph (10.9 kn; 20.1 km/h), making her the slowest ship in the entire fleet. (Normally, ships at the time would move at 12–14 mph (10–12 kn; 19–23 km/h). Ships were created during that period which could sail at 20 mph (17 kn; 32 km/h), but were scrapped or repowered immediately due to the high coal consumption.) [ what ships?]

Communication was possible using either the Chadburn telegraph or sound-powered telephones. The Chadburn receives signals from the pilothouse, which instructs the engineers below how fast the propeller needs to turn. Sound-powered telephones can be used to communicate with other parts of the ship at any time, and are especially useful for blackouts or other electrical emergencies.

== See also ==
- SS William G. Mather
- SS Leon Fraser
- SS William Clay Ford
- SS Edmund Fitzgerald
- SS Edward B. Greene
