= George Harsh =

American politician (1810–1897)

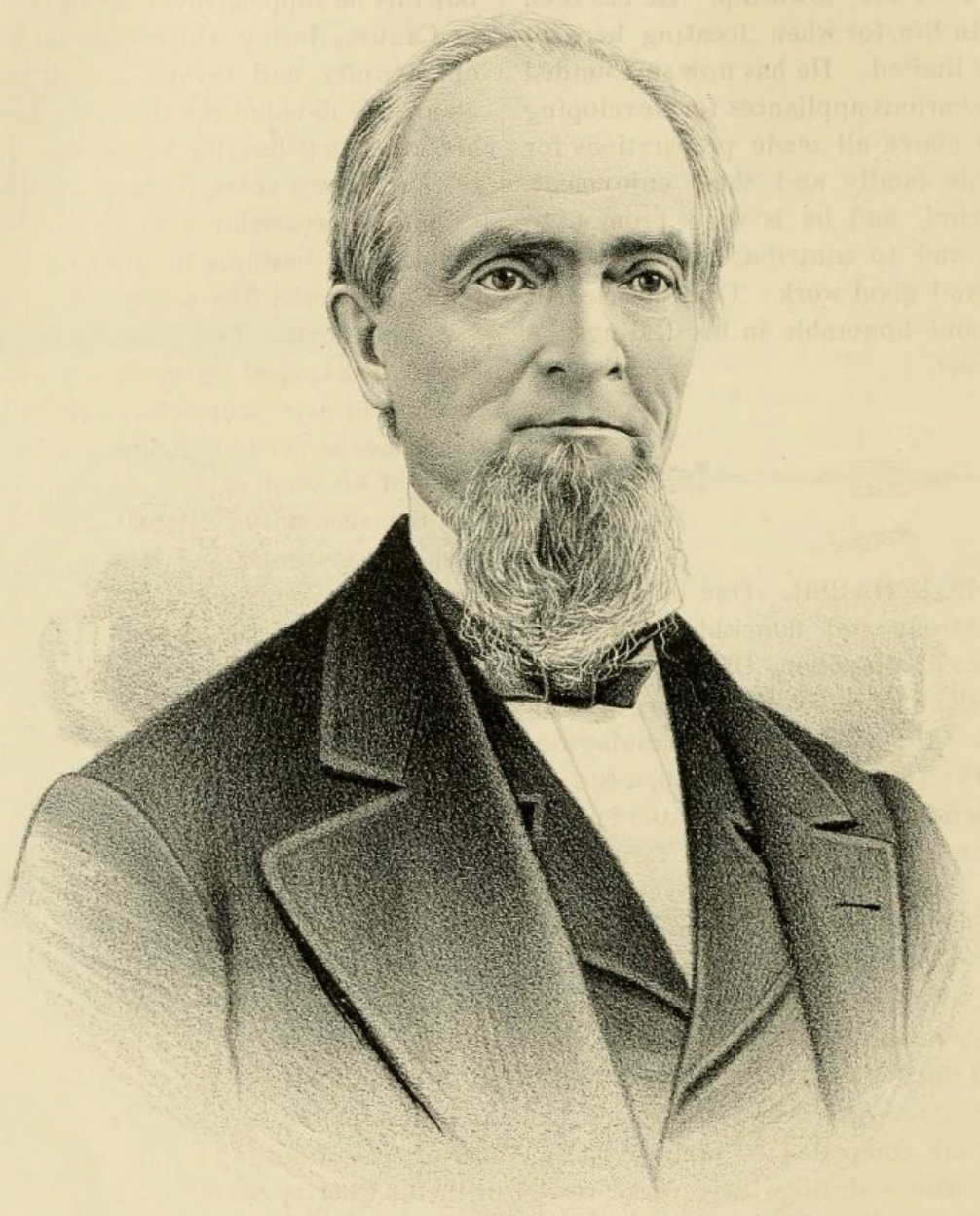
- Harsh in 1892 publication

Member of the Ohio Senate from the 21st district
- In office 1860–1864
- Preceded by: Francis J. Myer and Thomas W. Chapman
- Succeeded by: H. S. Martin

Member of the Ohio House of Representatives from the Stark County district
- In office 1846–1847 Serving with John S. Cock
- Preceded by: Samuel Stover
- Succeeded by: John S. Cock

Personal details
- Born: March 15, 1810 Washington County, Pennsylvania, U.S.
- Died: May 5, 1897 (aged 87) Massillon, Ohio, U.S.
- Party: Whig; Republican
- Spouse(s): Susanna Stoakley; Jane E. Smith; Sarah E. McCarthy
- Children: 10
- Occupation: Politician; merchant; real estate investor

George Harsh (March 15, 1810 – May 5, 1897) was an American politician from Ohio. He served as a member of the Ohio House of Representatives, representing Stark County from 1846 to 1847 and served as a member of the Ohio Senate from 1860 to 1864.

== Early life ==
George Harsh was born on March 15, 1810, in Washington County, Pennsylvania, to Catherine (née Stricker) and George Harsh. His father was a farmer, and in 1813, the family moved near Massillon, Ohio. They purchased about 260 acres (110 ha) of land. His parents were members of the German Lutheran Church. Harsh was educated at a log schoolhouse and also took an educational course in Canton. At the age of 17, Harsh taught country schools during the winter.

== Career ==
At the age of 22, Harsh worked with his brother Jacob in Massillon. In 1828, they started the mercantile business J. & G. Harsh. In March 1834, Jacob died and Harsh took over the business. For the next 23 years, Harsh ran the business primarily alone. He later became associated with A. J. Humberger and Samuel Oberlin in mercantile business. He retired from the mercantile business in 1863. Around 1866, Harsh started investing in real estate. He bought three farms near Massillon and bought a business block at the corner of Main Street and Erie Street in Massillon and two residences.

Harsh was a Whig until the party dissolved, and then he became a Republican. He served as a member of the city council of Massillon. In 1846, he was elected to the Ohio House of Representatives and served one term from 1846 to 1847, representing Stark County. In 1860, he was elected to the Ohio Senate, representing district 21 for two terms, from 1860 to 1864. While in the Ohio Senate, he was chairman of the committee on claims and public works. He was a member of the school board of Massillon from 1851 to 1869.

Harsh was director of the Ohio Penitentiary from 1867 to 1873. He was president and trustee of a charity school in Stark County. He also worked as director of the Massillon Union School for 18 years. He was one of the founders and served as vice president of the First National Bank in Massillon. He gave US$20,000 to the First Methodist Church building fund.

== Personal life ==
Harsh married Susanna Stoakley of Stark County. They had three children. He also married Jane E. Smith of Canonsburg, Pennsylvania. He married Sarah E. McCarthy of Wayne County, Ohio, and had seven children. One of his children James was a lawyer.

Harsh lived on Prospect Street in Massillon. He died on May 5, 1897, at his home in Massillon.

== Legacy ==
Upon his death, Harsh donated US$10,000 to help start the McClymonds Public Library in Massillon.
