= Xavier Institute of Engineering =

Engineering college in Mumbai, India

Coordinates: 19°2′42.15″N 72°50′29.78″E

- Type: Society of Jesus Roman Catholic Religious Minority Research Self-Financed Coeducational Higher Education Institution
- Established: 2005; 21 years ago
- Founders: Francis de Melo, S.J.
- Accreditation: NAAC Grade:B+
- Affiliations: Mumbai University & AICTE New Delhi & AJIT (Association of Jesuit Institutes of Technology)
- Religious affiliation: Society of Jesus (Roman Catholic)
- Chairperson: Fr Anil Pereira, S.J.
- Principal: Lata Ragha
- Director: Fr Dr John Rose, S.J.
- Students: 920
- Location: Mumbai, Maharashtra, India
- Campus: 5 acres
- Nickname: Xavierite
- Website: www.xavier.ac.in

The Xavier Institute of Engineering (XIE) is a privately owned, for-profit engineering college in central Mumbai. Established in the year 2005, it is a sister institution of St. Xavier's College. It prefers economically disadvantaged and Christian students. The institute is managed by Jesuits and is affiliated to Mumbai University. XIE is a member of the Association of Jesuit Institutes of Technology.

XIE began in the early 1930s as a technical institute on the premises of St. Xavier College, Mumbai, providing basic professional courses. In 2005, it became a polytechnic and was moved to Mahim.

== See also ==
- List of Jesuit sites
