= Harsh Mahajan (radiologist) =

Indian radiologist

- Born: New Delhi, India
- Occupation: Radiologist
- Known for: Radiology; Medical imaging
- Awards: Padma Shri

Harsh Mahajan is an Indian radiologist and one of the pioneers of imaging technology in India. He is the founder of Mahajan Imaging, a diagnostic imaging centre in the Indian capital of New Delhi. He is a former president of the Indian Radiological and Imaging Association (IRIA) and the director of the Department of Nuclear Medicine and Bone Densitometry at the Sir Ganga Ram Hospital. He has served as the honorary radiologist to the President of India and as the Honorary Consultant to the International Atomic Energy Agency (IAEA). He is on the Board of Advisors of Rishihood University. He has published several articles on clinical radiography and other medical topics. The Government of India awarded him the fourth highest civilian honour of the Padma Shri in 2002.
