= Harsh Kumar =

Indian ophthalmologist

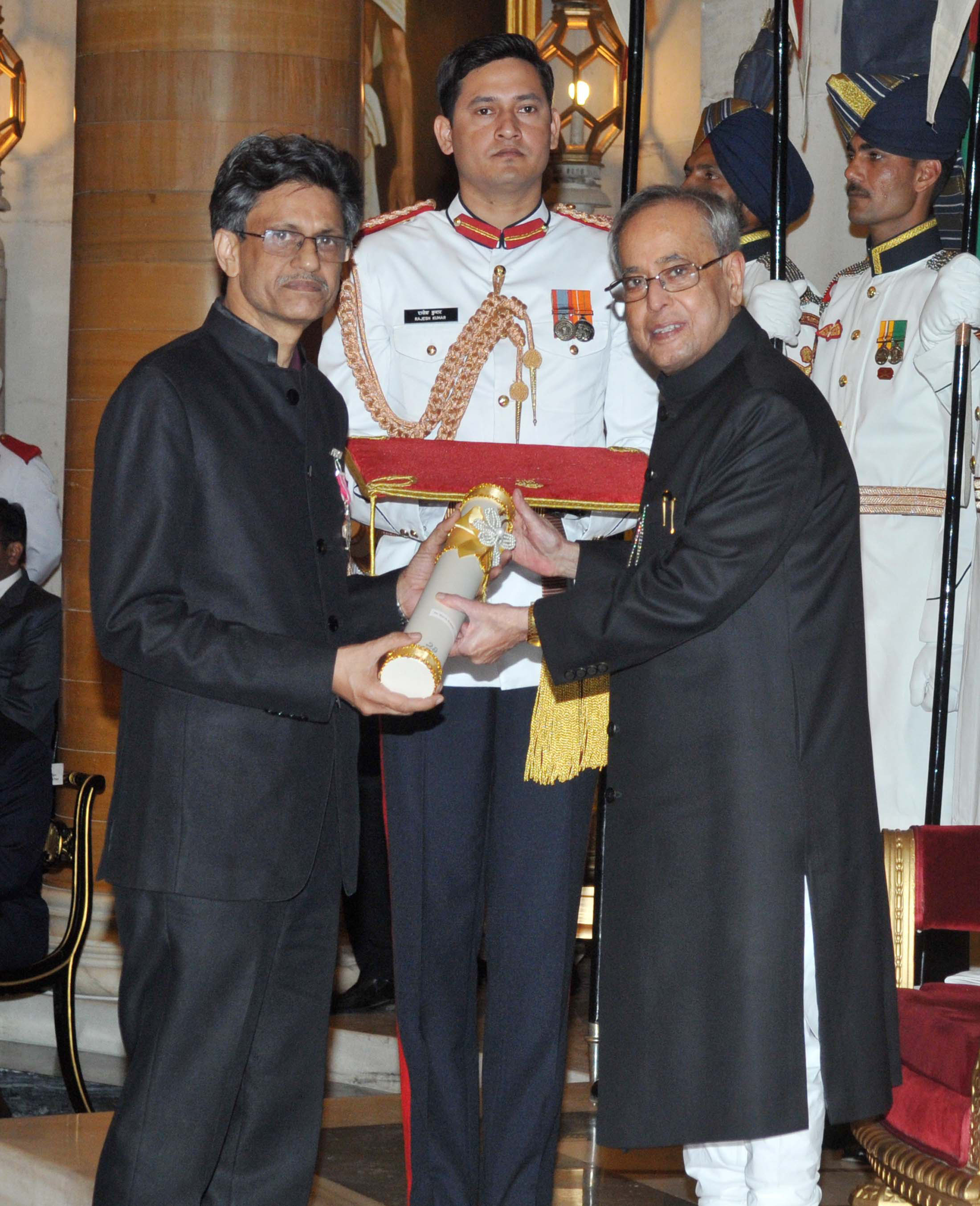
- The President, Shri Pranab Mukherjee presenting the Padma Shri Award to Dr. Harsh Kumar, at a Civil Investiture Ceremony, at Rashtrapati Bhavan, in New Delhi on March 30, 2015
- Born: India
- Occupation: Ophthalmologist
- Known for: Glaucoma management
- Awards: Padma Shri; A. C. Aggarwal Trophy; Bodh Raj Sabharwal Medal

Harsh Kumar is an Indian ophthalmologist, who is reported to have described nine laser surgical procedures for glaucoma and anterior segment of which one procedure is cited by Shields Text Book of Glaucoma, a known reference book on glaucoma management. He is the director of Glaucoma Services at Centre for Sight, New Delhi and also serves at the Indraprastha Apollo Hospitals, Delhi. He was honoured by the Government of India in 2015 with Padma Shri, the fourth highest Indian civilian award.

== Biography ==
Harsh Kumar graduated in medicine (MBBS) from the All India Institute of Medical Sciences, New Delhi, secured his master's degree (MD) in ophthalmology from Dr. Rajendra Prasad Centre for Ophthalmic Sciences, both with gold medals and did senior residency at R. P. Centre to pass out with the best senior resident award. He joined his alma mater as a member of faculty and served the institution as an additional professor of the glaucoma unit. He works at Centre for Sight, Delhi as the director of Glaucoma unit and at the Apollo Hospital, Indraprastha, as a consultant surgeon.

Kumar is a former president of the Glaucoma Society of India. He is known to have done extensive research on glaucoma and has published three books and 66 papers, besides contributing chapters to several textbooks on the subject. He is reported to have described nine laser surgical procedures for glaucoma and one of the procedures has been included in the Shields Text Book of Glaucoma, a widely referred reference book on the disease. He is also involved in continuous medical education by conducting classes and workshops on the subject and has mentored twenty five students in their doctoral researches.

Kumar, a recipient of ICMR fellowship, has received several awards such as Bodh Raj Sabharwal Medal (1985), A. C. Aggarwal Trophy (1988), P. N. Taneja Award (1994), D. B. Chandra oration Award (2007), Pratap Narain Memorial Lecture Award (2008) and A. N. Pandeya Oration Award (2010). The Government of India awarded him the civilian honour of Padma Shri in 2015.

== See also ==
- Glaucoma
