= Al-Kharsa =

Al-Kharsa الخرسا
- Village
- Location within Syria
- Coordinates: 32°55′25″N 36°29′37″E
- PAL: 289/260
- Country: Syria
- Governorate: Suwayda
- District: Shahba
- Subdistrict: Ariqah

Population (2004 census)
  - Total: 547
- Time zone: UTC+2 (EET)
  - Summer (DST): UTC+3 (EEST)

Al-Kharsa (Arabic: الخرسا) is a village situated in the Shahba District of Suwayda Governorate, in southern Syria. According to the Syria Central Bureau of Statistics (CBS), Al-Kharsa had a population of 547 in the 2004 census. Its inhabitants are predominantly Druze, with a Sunni Muslim Bedouin minority.

== History ==
In 1596, Najran appeared in Ottoman tax registers under the name of Harsa, as being in the nahiya of Bani Miglad in the Qada Hawran. It had a population of 13 households, all Muslim. The villagers paid a fixed tax-rate of 40% on various agricultural products, such as wheat (750 a.), barley (180 a.), summer crops (150 a.), goats and beehives (50 a.), in addition to "occasional revenues" (70 a.); a total of 1,200 akçe.

In 1838, it was noted as a ruin, el-Khursa, situated "in the Lejah, east of Dama".

== Religious buildings ==
- Maqam Umm al-Kabash (Druze Shrine)
- Omar ibn al-Khattab Mosque

== See also ==
- Druze in Syria

== Bibliography ==
- Hütteroth, W.-D.; Abdulfattah, K. (1977). Historical Geography of Palestine, Transjordan and Southern Syria in the Late 16th Century. Erlanger Geographische Arbeiten, Sonderband 5. Erlangen, Germany: Vorstand der Fränkischen Geographischen Gesellschaft. ISBN 3-920405-41-2.
- Robinson, E.; Smith, E. (1841). Biblical Researches in Palestine, Mount Sinai and Arabia Petraea: A Journal of Travels in the year 1838. Vol. 3. Boston: Crocker & Brewster.
