= Pigeon Run, Ohio =

Unincorporated community in Ohio, U.S.

Coordinates: 40°44′57″N 81°34′34″W

Pigeon Run is an unincorporated community in Stark County, in the U.S. state of Ohio.

== History ==
A post office called Pigeon Run was established in 1827, the name was changed to Pigeonrun in 1895, and the post office closed in 1907. The community took its name from nearby Pigeon Run creek. Pigeon Run was a mining community and the Pigeon Run Coal Company operated there.
