= George W. Wilhelm =

American politician (1847–1902)

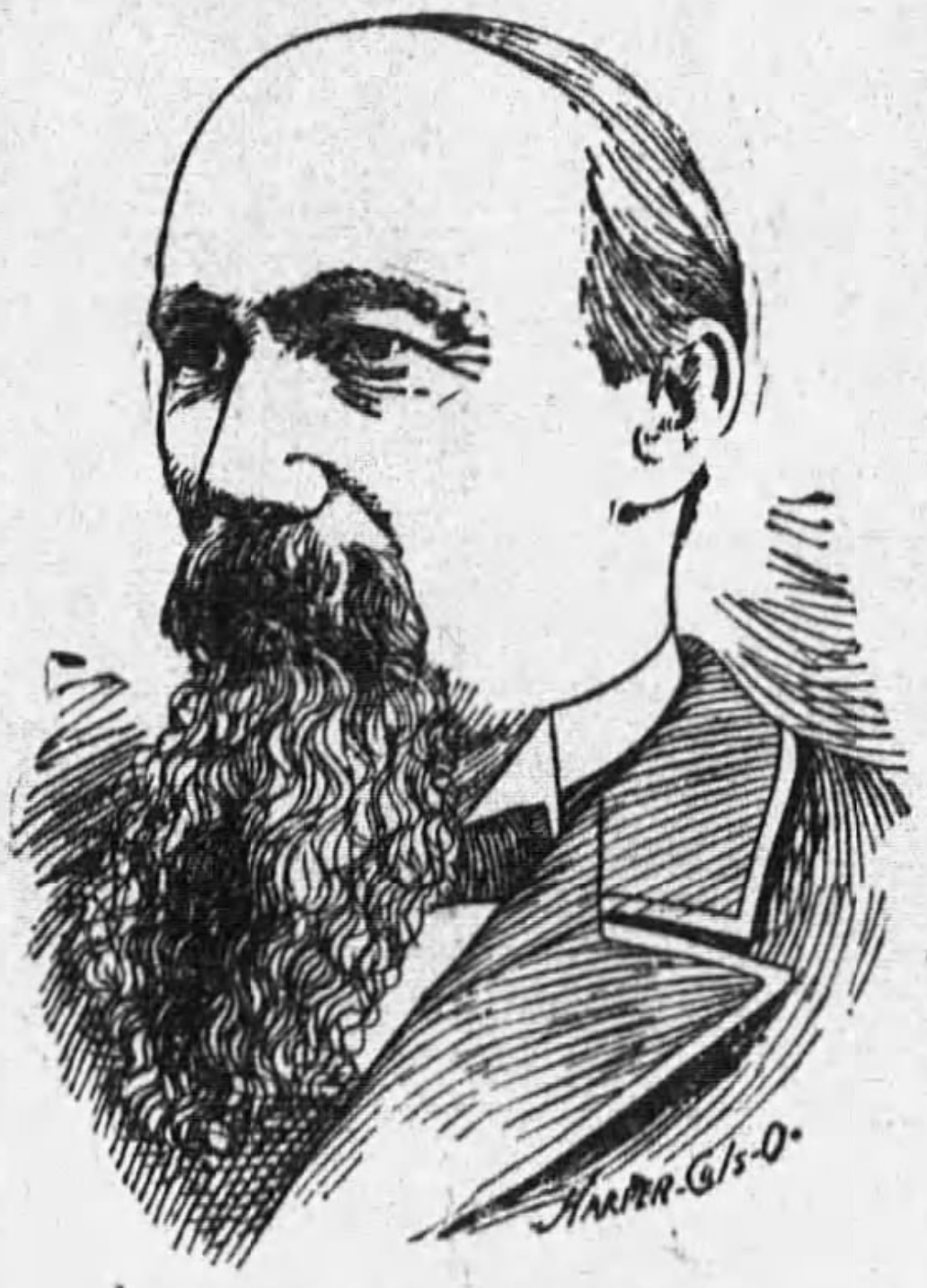
- Sketch of Wilhelm in 1896 newspaper

Member of the Ohio Senate from the 21st district
- In office 1900 – December 18, 1902
- Preceded by: Silas J. Williams
- Succeeded by: Robert A. Pollock

Member of the Ohio House of Representatives from the Stark County district
- In office 1896–1897
- Preceded by: John Thomas
- Succeeded by: Jacob B. Snyder
- In office 1888–1889
- Preceded by: Leander C. Cole
- Succeeded by: Edward E. Dresbach

Personal details
- Born: 1847 Wilmot, Ohio, U.S.
- Died: December 18, 1902 (aged 54–55) Justus, Ohio, U.S.
- Resting place: Welty Cemetery near Justus, Ohio, U.S.
- Party: Republican
- Occupation: Politician; store owner

George W. Wilhelm (1847 – December 18, 1902) was an American politician and store owner from Ohio. He served as a member of the Ohio House of Representatives, representing Stark County from 1888 to 1889 and from 1896 to 1897. He served as a member of the Ohio Senate from 1900 to his death.

== Early life ==
George W. Wilhelm was born in 1847 in Wilmot, Ohio. He attended country school until he turned 13. At the age of 16, Wilhelm enlisted in the Union Army. He was at the Siege of Petersburg.

== Career ==
Starting in 1865, Wilhelm worked in machine and sawmill work for 14 years. He started a general store in Justus in 1878. It was the first store in the town. He also served as the first justice of the peace in Justus and served as the township assessor.

Wilhelm was a Republican. Wilhelm served as a member of the Ohio House of Representatives, representing Stark County, from 1888 to 1889 and from 1896 to 1897. He served as a member of the Ohio Senate, representing the 21st district (Carroll and Stark counties), from 1900 to his death in 1902.

Wilhelm was appointed by the governor as a member of the state decennial board of equalization. He served one term.

== Personal life ==
Wilhelm married and his wife died in 1901. They had one daughter, Jennie.

Wilhelm died on December 18, 1902, at his home near Justus. He was buried at Welty Cemetery near Justus.
