= Cvent =

American software-as-a-service company

Cvent Holding Corp.
- Company type: Private
- Traded as: Nasdaq: CVT (2021–2023)
- Industry: Software
- Founded: 1999; 27 years ago
- Founders: Reggie Aggarwal
- Headquarters: Tysons Corner, Virginia, United States
- Key people: Reggie Aggarwal (CEO); David Quattrone (CTO); Chuck Ghoorah (President of Worldwide Sales & Marketing)
- Owners: Blackstone Inc.; Abu Dhabi Investment Authority
- Number of employees: 5,000+ (2025)

Cvent Holding Corp. is a Tysons Corner, Virginia–based company that provides software-as-a-service (SaaS) for meetings, events, and hospitality management.

Cvent also provides software for hotels and venues to manage group bookings, including corporate travel, and source new group business. Previously a public company, Cvent was acquired by investment firm Blackstone Inc. for $4.6 billion in June 2023.

== Operations ==
Cvent is headquartered in Tysons Corner, Virginia, a suburb of Washington D.C. International Cvent offices include Canada, the United Kingdom, India, Singapore and Melbourne.

Cvent traded on the New York Stock Exchange starting in 2013 under the symbol CVT until it was taken private in 2016 by Vista Equity Partners. After becoming a public company again, Cvent was traded on the Nasdaq Global Market under the stock symbol CVT starting in 2021, before being taken private by Blackstone.

== History ==
Cvent was founded in September 1999 by Reggie Aggarwal. At its founding, Cvent had an initial staff of six individuals working in technology, business, and marketing. Prior to co-founding Cvent in 1999, Reggie served as the president of the Indian CEO Network.

In 1999, Cvent received US$17 million in venture capital and grew its staff to 125 employees.

In April 2001, Cvent had 300 customers, including MCO WorldCom, McDonald's, Princeton University, University of Virginia, Ernst & Young, and Hughes Network Systems.

Following the dot-com bubble burst and the September 11 attacks, Cvent faced near-bankruptcy and was forced to cut 80% of its staff. The company became profitable again in 2003.

In 2011, Cvent was growing by 50% a year and received $136 million of funding from New Enterprise Associates in July 2011, which, at the time, was the largest investment in a U.S. software company since 2007.

Cvent filed an S-1 with the U.S. Securities and Exchange Commission on July 8, 2013, proposing an initial public offering of 5.6 million shares. The company went public on the New York Stock Exchange on August 9, 2013, at an initial price of $21. Cvent raised $117.6 million and received a market capitalization of over $1 billion. The IPO was referenced in regard to its use of the JOBS Act, which enabled the company to quickly offer an IPO.

In 2016, the company was acquired by venture capital company Vista Equity Partners for $1.65 billion. Ashok Trivedi, the co-founder of Mastech Digital and iGate was an early investor in the company. After closing its acquisition of Cvent, Vista Equity Partners announced it would merge Cvent with Lanyon, another meetings-technology firm owned by Vista, branding them both under the Cvent name.

Following the close of a merger deal with Dragoneer Growth Opportunities Corp. II, a special purpose acquisition company (SPAC), Cvent went public on the Nasdaq Global Market. on December 9, 2021. In March 2023, Cvent agreed to be taken private again by Blackstone Inc. in a $4.6 billion deal that includes a significant minority investment from the Abu Dhabi Investment Authority.
