= RockMyRun =

Mobile fitness application

Rock My Run
- Company type: Private
- Website type: Fitness/running app
- Founded: 2011 (Rock My World, Inc., San Diego, California, United States)
- Headquarters: San Diego, California, United States
- Area served: Worldwide
- Founders: Adam Riggs-Zeigen; Colby Walsworth
- Key people: Rob Hemker (CEO & President); Richard Moore (CFO); Marc Thrasher (Director of Amazing Content)
- Website: rockmyrun.com
- Launched: 2011; 15 years ago
- Current status: Active

Rock My Run (stylized as RockMyRun; trademarked slogan: "The Best Running Music in the World™") is a mobile running/fitness app founded in 2011 that provides running and workout music in the form of DJ mixes. It is owned by Rock My World, Inc., a health and fitness technology company based in San Diego, California. The app allows users to listen to these professional DJ mixes on their smartphone while running or working out to enhance and motivate their performance.

Rock My World, Inc. also developed the app Jolt.ai for the software Slack.

== History ==
During the early stages of the company, Rock My World, Inc. raised more than $2 million in funding generated by the Irvine Company's The Vine SD and from institutional investors including Skullcandy, ZTE and Lighter Capital and were admitted to the Plug and Play Tech Center in Sunnyvale and to the tech incubator EvoNexus in San Diego. In an interview with co-founder and ex-Qualcomm staff Adam Riggs-Zeigen, he said that "from the beginning [their] big goal is to help people live healthier lives."

== Features ==
The RockMyRun app contains thousands of mixes or "stations" produced by its professional DJs intended to increase enjoyment and performance during exercise. DJs who have provided mixes for the app include David Guetta, Zedd, Steve Aoki, Major Lazer and Afrojack. All of the music can be personalized based on the user's steps per minute, heart rate or ideal cadence allowing the user to "always hear the right music at the right time at the right tempo".

All RockMyRun mixes are organized into stations to help users discover music that suits their needs. RockMyRun contains mixes of all genres and each station is categorized into their respective genres and displays tags to let users know the type of music contained in the mix.

RockMyRun has two membership types; it is free as a standard member, but for uninterrupted listening and additional features, users can upgrade to a paid "Rockstar" membership.

Since March 2023, couples can now be on the same RockMyRun playlists and "share" earbuds. This allows people to train together, easier. A group of DJs curate playlists for specific training needs and different energy levels.

== Reception ==
RockMyRun has been featured on television programs such as The Today Show on two occasions and on The Rachael Ray Show, and in positive reviews by many publications and websites including The New York Times on four separate occasions, TIME, The Huffington Post, The Denver Post, Men's Fitness, Real Simple, The Vulcan Post, The L.A. Times, Glamour, Paste magazine, PCMag, Dubai Week, BetaNews, CNET, CNBC, Reuters, Insider, Tom's Guide and Yahoo! Tech.

RockMyRun has also been mentioned/recommended in books/publications such as A Practical Guide to Teacher Wellbeing by Elizabeth Holmes and Applying Music in Exercise and Sport by Dr. Costas Karageorghis.

Ultimate Ears placed RockMyRun at the top of their list at No. 1 on their "5 Favorite Workout Music Apps".

In a positive review by David Strausser for AndroidGuys in 2015, he praised the app in a detailed review, saying "The mixes are incredible and the rates are reasonable. The app is quick, beautiful."

In 2015, Jill Duffy of PC Magazine gave a review of the app, pointing out its key features, and stating that the app is great if you enjoy listening to different, or new music, that can match your tempo while running.

Also in 2015, Digital Trends listed RockMyRun, as one of the best exercise music apps in the article "No need to make exercise playlists with these music apps".

In 2018, Redbull.com recommended RockMyRun in preparation for the Wings for Life World Run in their article "10 essential hacks for running to work to get you in World Run shape".

In 2019, The Fashion Spot included RockMyRun in their list of "The Best Workout Apps for People Who Hate to Work Out", saying: "RockMyRun matches music to the tempo of your running pace – the music literally follows your steps/heart rate. The app has thousands of mixes/music options along with tracking capabilities."

Also in 2019, MakeUseOf.com included RockMyRun in their list of "The 7 Best Running and Workout Music Apps".

In September 2022, VeryWellFit listed RockMyRun as the first of three "Other Playlist Options" in the article "How to Create a Running Playlist, According to Running Coaches".

Tech Grapple recommended the app in "The best workout free music apps for iPhone and Android" saying that "RockMyRun is the best application that you can use during workout. It comes with amazing DJs to craft mixes that will keep you moving."

== Partners ==
RockMyRun is partnered with the following brands/companies:

- C25K
- Del Taco
- JLab Audio
- iFit
- Active Network, LLC
- Night Nation Run (the world's first running music festival)
- Lady Foot Locker
- Mayweather Boxing + Fitness
- Mio Global
- Orangetheory Fitness
- Red Rock Apps
- Tapout Fitness
