= Achyut =

Achyut is a given name. Notable people with the name include:

- Rajendra Achyut Badwe, Indian medical doctor and surgical oncologist
- Achyut Charan Choudhury (1866–1953), Bengali writer and historian
- Achyut Godbole (born 1950), Indian businessman and writer
- Achyut Madhav Gokhale (1946–2021), Indian civil servant
- Achyut Kanvinde (1916–2002), Indian architect in functionalist approaches
- Achyut Krishna Kharel, chief of Nepal Police during the Maoist's Insurgency
- Achyut Lahkar (1931–2016), the father of the Bhryamyman or Mobile theatre
- Achyut Prasad Mainali, Nepalese politician and member of parliament
- Achyut Ramchandra Palav (born 1960), Indian calligrapher and educator
- Achyut Patwardhan (1905–1992), Indian independence activist, founder of the Socialist Party of India
- Achyut Potdar (1934–2025), Indian actor who worked in over 125 Bollywood films
- Achyut Yagnik (1946–2023), Indian journalist, academic, political analyst and activist
