= Narendra Patni =

Indian businessman and IT pioneer (1942–2014)

- Born: 9 March 1942; Delhi, India
- Died: 3 June 2014 (aged 72); Boston
- Education: (B.Tech) IIT Roorkee (MS) (MBA) Massachusetts Institute of Technology
- Known for: Founding and heading the Patni Computer Systems and pioneering offshore services business model in India.
- Spouse: Poonam Kapur
- Children: 2
- Awards: IIT Roorkee Distinguished Alumni Award (2008); Grass Foundation Fellowship (1964); Light of India Lifetime Achievement Award (2012)

Narendra Kumar Patni (9 March 1942 – 3 June 2014) was Indian businessman and pioneer who founded Patni Computer Systems. He is known for pioneering and starting outsourced software services in the US and then developed a back-end in India, which is now known as "offshore services" a dominant business model in the Indian IT Industry today. Patni was listed in the Forbes list of India's 40 Richest in 2005.

== Early life and education ==
Narendra Patni was born on 9 March 1942 in Delhi, India to a Jain Business family. He graduated in electrical engineering from the IIT Roorkee and then he then received a fellowship from the Grass Foundation to study at the Massachusetts Institute of Technology in Cambridge, MA, arriving in the US in 1964—the year before the Immigration and Nationality Act of 1965 started Indian immigration to the US in earnest. after which he completed his MS degree in electrical engineering from the MIT. He also held an MBA from the MIT Sloan School of Management.

== Career ==
At MIT Patni met Jay W. Forrester, inventor of magnetic core memory, who became his lifelong mentor. After graduating from MIT Patni joined Forrester Consulting Group, which applied "systems analysis approach to complex corporate systems"

In 1972, Patni was president of Forrester Consulting Group, which advised companies and government agencies on technology issues. It was at this time that Patni and his wife Poonam began to conceptualise and test the idea of "offshoring" technology services.

The site of their initial tests, Patni's residence at 10 St Paul Street, Cambridge, "could qualify as a historic landmark" as this is where Narendra and Poonam experimented with converting data from paper documents to computer databases without relying on any oral communications. Patni was convinced of the economic impact that this business model could have and set up Data Conversion, Inc, in October 1972.

Poonam Patni based herself in Pune, India and set up a team of about 20 programmers who entered data into Flexowriter machines for early clients, who included Lexis Nexis, the American Film Institute, and the American Mathematical Society. The paper tape was then converted into magnetic tape and entered into a computer. "At one point of time, DCI was typesetting almost half of the journals published in north-east USA." Initially, the paper tape was produced in India and shipped back to the US. A more efficient method was to avoid the paper tape and enter the data directly into computers, on magnetic media.

Patni Computer Systems was founded in 1976. This marked the beginning of an evolution in Patni's model from offshore data conversion services to software development services. Initial clients were Data General, Raheja Constructions, and ACC. Patni Computers also became a distributor and later licensed manufacturer of Data General computers.

In 1977, Patni appointed NR Narayana Murthy to head the software division, who eventually left Patni Computers in 1980 along with six colleagues and went on to found Infosys.

In 1999, Patni Computer Systems was restructured as a "pure software operation" It became a "separate entity from PCS Industries Limited". In 2001 the software (PATNI) and hardware (PCS Technologies) divisions were separated entirely in branding as well. With the Patni Computer Systems, the software company, being branded as PATNI.

General Atlantic Partners, a leading global private equity company, invested $100 million in Patni Computer Systems in 2002. It was "one of the most substantial investments made in any Indian software company by an international private investment group and [was] the largest made by General Atlantic in Asia."

Patni Computers listed on the Bombay Stock Exchange (BSE) and National Stock Exchange of India in January 2004. It issued ADRs on the NYSE (ticker: PTI) in December 2005. Patni divided his time between Mumbai, India and Boston, MA.

In 2011 software firm iGate acquired a majority stake in PCS for $1.2 billion. This deal was "the second-largest in the high technology sector in terms of deal value, after Oracle Corp's acquisition of majority stake in India's i-flex solutions for more than $1.5 billion, according to Thomson Reuters data." At the time of its acquisition, Patni Computer Systems was the sixth-largest software exporter in India.

== Personal life ==
Patni was married for 42 years to Poonam Kapur, who was born in Lucknow, India and emigrated to the US in 1972. She divides her time between Boston and Mumbai. His son Anirudh (born 1976) is a graduate of the Massachusetts Institute of Technology and The Wharton School, University of Pennsylvania. Daughter Ambika (born 1979) is a graduate of Harvard University and the London Business School.

A lover of all kinds of music, ranging from Joan Baez to jazz to classical Hindi ghazals, Patni attended the Woodstock music festival in 1969. He served on the board of trustees and was a significant benefactor for Siddhachalam, a major Jain ashram complex and pilgrimage point in New Jersey.

== Death ==
He died on 3 June 2014 in Boston MA.
