= Wadhwani Institute for Artificial Intelligence =

Nonprofit institute in Mumbai

Wadhwani AI
- Formation: 2018; 8 years ago
- Founders: Romesh Wadhwani, Sunil Wadhwani
- Headquarters: Mumbai, Maharashtra, India
- Region served: India
- Key people: Sameer Garde (CEO); P. Anandan (ex-CEO)
- Website: Wadhwani AI

Wadhwani AI, based in Mumbai, Maharashtra, is an independent, non-profit institute. Founded in 2018, it is dedicated to developing artificial intelligence solutions for social good. Their mission is to build AI-based innovations and solutions for underserved communities in developing countries, for a wide range of domains including agriculture, education, financial inclusion, healthcare, and infrastructure.

== History and funding ==
The institute was founded with a $30 million philanthropic effort by the Wadhwani brothers, Romesh Wadhwani and Sunil Wadhwani. The institute was inaugurated and dedicated to the nation by Narendra Modi, the 14th prime minister of India.

In 2019, the institute received a $2 million grant from Google.org to create technologies to help reduce crop losses in cotton farming, through integrated pest management. The United States Agency for International Development awarded $2 million to the institute in 2020 to develop tools, using mathematical modeling techniques and digital technologies such as artificial intelligence and machine learning, to forecast COVID-19 disease patterns, estimate resources needed, and plan interventions.

== Collaboration ==
With assistance from Google, the Ministry of Agriculture and Farmers' Welfare and the Wadhwani AI developed Krishi 24/7, the first AI-powered automated agricultural news monitoring and analysis tool. Through better decision-making, Krishi 24/7 will support the identification of valuable news, provide timely notifications, and respond quickly to safeguard farmers' interests and advance sustainable agricultural growth. The application converts news articles into English after scanning them in several languages. It ensures that the ministry is informed in a timely manner about pertinent occurrences that are published online by extracting key information from news items, including the headline, crop name, event type, date, location, severity, summary, and source link. The National Center for Disease Control has effectively implemented a comparable automated surveillance and analysis tool for disease outbreaks.

== See also ==
- Lists of open-source artificial intelligence software
