= Couch to 5K =

Exercise program

C25K
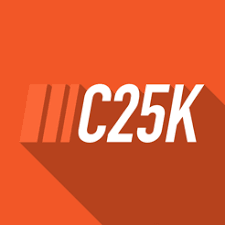
- Original author: Josh Clark
- Developer: Zen Labs
- Release: 1996; 30 years ago
- Operating system: Android, iOS
- Platform: Mobile
- Available in: English
- Type: Fitness, Exercise
- License: Proprietary
- Website: www.c25kfree.com

Couch to 5K, abbreviated C25K, is an exercise plan that gradually progresses from beginner running toward a 5 kilometre (3.1 mile) run over nine weeks.

== Operations ==
The Couch to 5K running plan, also known as C25K, created by Josh Clark in 1996, was developed with the expectation of creating a plan for new runners to start running. The plan is aimed to have users work out for 20 to 30 minutes, three days a week. Within the program, users can be expected to perform different tasks such as intervals of running with period of short walks in between to help build endurance in the weeks up to the final goal of a 5K run. During the nine weeks leading up to the race, the runner will learn to set their own pace and where their strengths and weaknesses are within running. Often, the daily workouts start with a five-minute warm-up walk and works up to running five kilometres without a walking break within nine weeks. Users are not expected to have any experience in running, and can be some of the first running that they ever do. The main goal is to turn that unexperienced runner into someone who can run a 5K.

Clark started the website Kick and featured C25K on the site. In 2001, Kick merged with Cool Running, a New England–based running site. Clark later sold his stake in Cool Running and the Couch to 5K program. Cool Running was absorbed into Active.com, operated by Active Network, LLC. Active Network provides mobile apps for Couch to 5K, as well as 5K to 10K, a follow-up program.

The NHS in the UK provides downloadable podcasts and a smartphone app (Android and iOS) for the plan.

A mobile app, created by Zen Labs, has training plans that are based on the Couch to 5K running plan from CoolRunning.com. It is one of the highest-rated health and fitness apps available on Android and iOS.

As of 2016, the C25K app has been used by over 5 million people.
