= National Entrepreneurship Network =

Indian professional organization

National Entrepreneurship Network(NEN)
- Founded: 2003
- Founder: Sunita Singh, Laura Parkin, Sunita Singh, Nilima Rovshen
- Type: Entrepreneurship ecosystem
- Purpose: Entrepreneurship
- Location: Bengaluru
- Origins: India
- Region served: India
- Services: Capacity building, inclusive entrepreneurship
- Members: over 70,000
- Owner: National Entrepreneurship Network
- Key people: Sunita Singh, Trustee
- Website: www.nen.org

National Entrepreneurship Network or NEN is a community dedicated to fostering entrepreneurship. Services focus on providing institutional capacity building, entrepreneur support, entrepreneurial eco-system and national platforms. Based on an idea by Romesh Wadhwani, and co-founded with Sunita Singh, Nilima Rovshen, and Laura Parkin, the goal of the community is to enable new and future entrepreneurs to access events and resources, share ideas and content, organize and market activities, and forge relationships across India and the world. Programs include a variety of supports including competitions. They are located in Bangalore.

== History of NEN ==
National Entrepreneurship Network (NEN) was launched in 2003, as a non-profit initiative of the Wadhwani Foundation. It was co-founded with IIT Bombay, IIM Ahmedabad, BITS Pilani, SPJIMR Mumbai and IBAB Bengaluru.

== See also ==
- Business incubator
- Business cluster
- Creative entrepreneurship
