= Rock my world =

Rock My World may refer to:

- Rock My World (album), a 2008 album by Bret Michaels
- "Rock My World" (Five Star song), a 1988 song by Five Star
- "Rock My World (Little Country Girl)", a 1993 song by Brooks & Dunn
- Rock My World, Inc., a San Diego technology company which owns RockMyRun, a mobile running/workout app
- Rock My World, U.S. title for the 2002 film Global Heresy
- "Rock My World", episode 18 of the third season of the American animated television series Generator Rex
- "Rock My World", a 2002 song by Lee Kernaghan from the album Electric Rodeo
- "You Rock My World", a 2001 song by Michael Jackson
- "You Rock My World", a 2004 song by Devi Sri Prasad, Shaan, Premji Amaren from the Indian film Arya (2004 film)
