= Vivek Gupta =

Vivek Gupta may refer to:

- Vivek Gupta (business executive) (born 1963), Indian-born American business leader
- Vivek Gupta (major) (1970–1999), Indian army officer
- Vivek Gupta (politician) (born 1975), Indian politician
