= Srinivas Kandula =

Indian Business Executive and Academic

- Education: XLRI Jamshedpur
- Occupations: Indian Business Executive and Academic
- Organization(s): Centre for Organizational Development, Capgemini, IGATE, Sasken, Power Grid Corporation
- Board member of: Mastech Digital, Cigniti (Past)

Srinivas Kandula is an Indian business executive and academic, known for his leadership roles in the information technology and organizational development sectors. He has held senior positions at Capgemini India, IGATE Corporation, and currently serves in executive and advisory capacities. Kandula is an independent director on the board of Mastech Digital, a NYSE‑listed company, and served as a director on the board of Cigniti Technologies Ltd.

== Career ==
- Early roles: Kandula held leadership positions in human resources at Power Grid Corporation of India and at Sasken Technologies, where he focused on organizational effectiveness and corporate HR initiatives.
- IGATE (2007–2015): He joined IGATE in 2007, serving as Executive Vice President, Member of the Executive Council, and Chief People Officer. In this capacity, he oversaw global business strategy, human resources, quality management, and marketing. He also led integration efforts during the acquisitions of Patni Computer Systems (2011) and IGATE's merger into Capgemini (2015).
- Capgemini (2016–2018 and beyond):
  - Appointed Chief Executive Officer of Capgemini India effective 1 January 2016. He joined the Group Executive Committee concurrently.
  - In December 2018, he transitioned to the role of Chairman, Capgemini India, reporting to the Group COO and focusing on strategic talent initiatives and stakeholder engagement.
- Centre for Organization Development (COD), Hyderabad (2022–present):
  - In February 2022, he became Director and Chairperson of Leadership Development at the Centre for Organization Development in Hyderabad.
- Cigniti Technologies (2023):
  - In March 2023, Kandula was appointed as an Executive Director on the Board of Cigniti Technologies, where he contributes strategic leadership across functional areas to support the company's growth objectives Business Wirehrnxt.comCigniti Technologies.

== Publications and Professional Affiliations ==
Kandula has authored over 60 academic and industry papers and has written eight books on topics such as strategic human resource development, organizational change, performance management, and self-development. His works have been published by international publishers in multiple languages.

He has also been active in professional organizations including NASSCOM, the Confederation of Indian Industry (CII), and the Indo-American Chamber of Commerce.

== See also ==
- Ashok Vemuri
- Satya Nadella
