= Achyut Godbole =

Indian businessman & writer (born 1950)

- Born: 15 August 1950 (age 75); Solapur, Maharashtra, India
- Education: Chemical Engineering (IIT Bombay)
- Occupations: Businessman; Writer; CEO, Patni Computer Systems.
- Spouse: Shobhana Godbole

Achyut Godbole (born 15 August 1950) is an Indian businessman and writer from Mumbai, India. He was CEO of Patni Computer Systems (later acquired by IGate) and few more leading IT firms in 1980 and 1990s. He was at the position of CEO for almost 23 years in his career in management. He moved to writing.

== Early life ==
Achyut Godbole was born in Solapur and completed his school education from Haribhai Deokaran High School, Solapur. He earned a degree in chemical engineering from IIT Bombay in 1972.

== Literary accomplishments ==
Godbole is well known for his writings in Marathi and English. He is a writer in all genres and has produced numerous original works as well as adaptations of works from other languages into Marathi. His writing style is informative and yet very informal. This enables his readers to enjoy the process of assimilating knowledge on diverse subjects.

=== Books in Marathi ===
- Sanganakyug (computers) - संगणक- युग (कॉम्प्युटर, माहितीपर, मार्गदर्शनपर)
- Boardroom (management) - बोर्डरूम (बिझनेस आणि व्यवस्थापन, वैचारिक, माहितीपर)
- Nadvedh (music) - नादवेध (अनुभव कथन, ललित, संगीत विषयक)
- Kimayagar (science) - किमयागार (शास्त्र)
- Arthat (economics) - अर्थात (अर्थशास्त्र, शैक्षणिक)
- Gulam (slavery) - गुलाम (सामाजिक)
- Thaiman Changalvadache (psychology) -थैमान चंगळवादाचे
- Nanodaya (nanotechnology)- नॅनोदय (विज्ञानविषयक, टेक्नोलॉजी)
- Steve Jobs (biography)-- स्टीव्ह जॉब्ज (चरित्र)
- Manat (psychology) - मनात
- Musafir (autobiography) - मुसाफिर (आत्मकथन, अनुभव कथन, माहितीपर)
- Ganiti (mathematics) - गणिती (शैक्षणिक, विज्ञानविषयक)
- Zapoorza - Parts 1, 2 & 3 (English literature) - झपूर्झा (शैक्षणिक, माहितीपर, साहित्य आणि समीक्षा, मार्गदर्शनपर)
- Canvas (Western painters and paintings)- कॅनव्हास (कलाकौशल्य, भेट देण्यासाठी निवडक, माहितीपर)
- Jag Badalnare 12 Genius - जग बदलणारे १२ जीनिअस
- Limelight - लाईमलाईट (व्यक्तिचित्रण, चरित्र, चित्रपट)
- जीनिअस अल्बर्ट आईनस्टाईन
- जीनिअस अलेक्झांडर फ्लेमिंग
- जीनिअस एडवर्ड जेन्नर
- जीनिअस गॅलिलिओ गॅलिली
- जीनिअस आयझॅक न्यूटन
- जीनिअस जे. रॉबर्ट ओपेनहायमर
- जीनिअस लीझ माइट्नर
- जीनिअस लुई पाश्चर
- जीनिअस मेरी क्युरी
- जीनिअस स्टीफन हाॅकिंग
- Great Bhet - ग्रेट भेट
- Anarth (dangers of human life) - अनर्थ (विकासनीती सर्वनाशाच्या उंबरठ्यावर)

=== Books in English ===
- Operating Systems
- Data Communication and Networks
- Web Technologies
- Demystifying Computers – This is used as textbooks worldwide. Many are translated in different languages like Chinese.

=== Columns in newspapers and magazines ===
- Zapoorza (English literature)
- Tantra-Mantra (technology)
- Bakhar Sangankachi (history of computers)
- Udyache jag (tomorrows world)
- Vaidyakayan (history of medicine)
- Pranijagat (animals)
- Vidnyanvad (science)
- Manat (Psychology)
- Sakha Nagarhole (Forest)
