= 717 Harwood =

Skyscraper in Dallas Texas

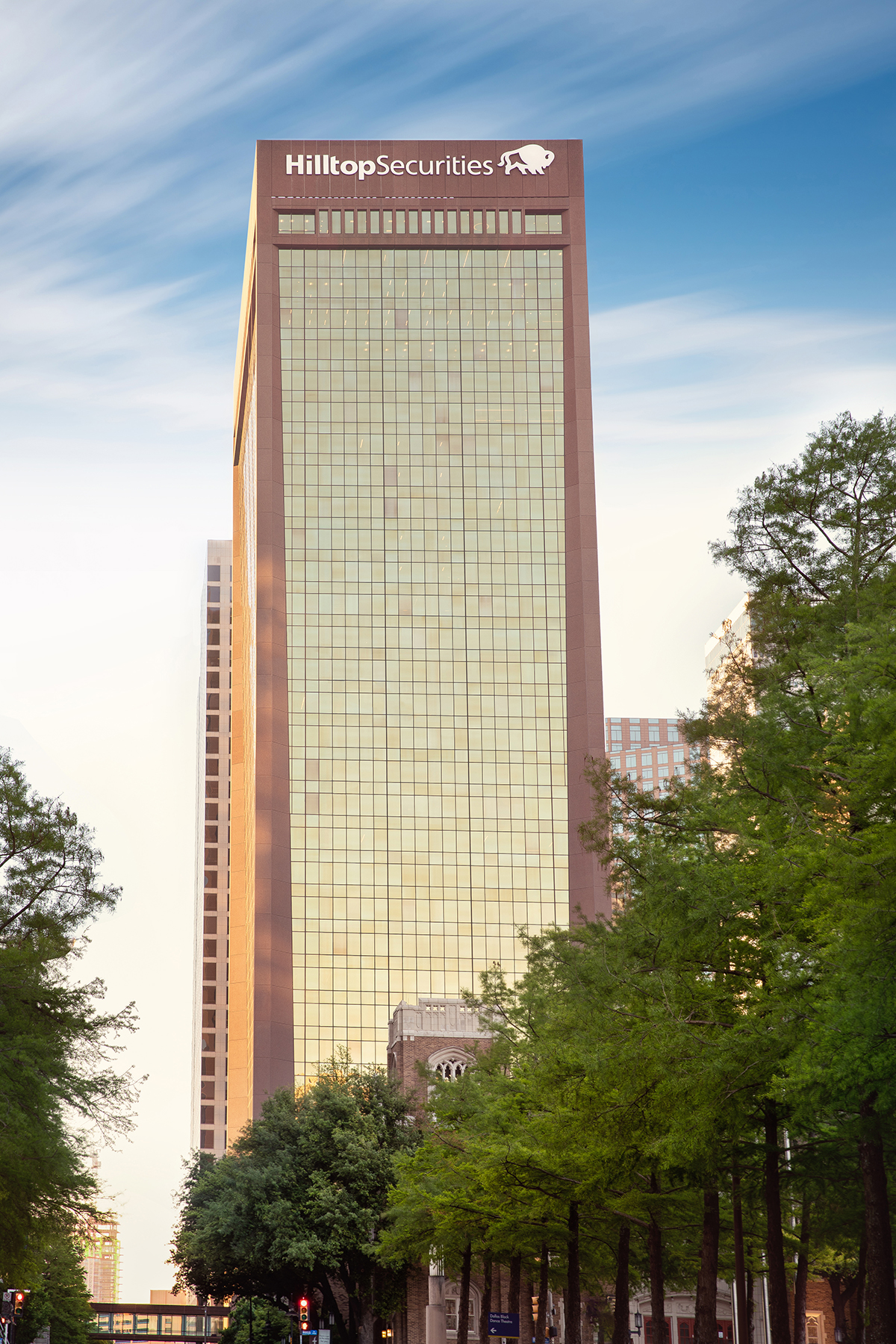
- Interactive map of the 717 Harwood area
- Alternative names: Hilltop Securities Tower

General information
- Status: Completed
- Type: Office
- Location: 717 North Harwood Street, Dallas, Texas, United States
- Coordinates: 32°47′09″N 96°47′53″W
- Opening: 1980
- Owner: Dalan Real Estate

Height
- Roof: 481 ft (147 m)

Technical details
- Floor count: 34

Design and construction
- Developer: Harlan Crow

717 Harwood is a skyscraper in Downtown Dallas, Texas. The building rises 481 feet (147 meters). Completed in 1980, the building has 34 floors spanning approximately 850,000 square feet. 717 Harwood currently stands as the 22nd-tallest building in the city. The building is well known for its sloping exterior glass walls, which slant inward from the building's top floor to ground level. 717 Harwood is owned by Dalan Real Estate, a New York–based real estate investment firm (formerly SKW Funding).

The building formerly housed the Dallas offices of KPMG, until their move in 2015 to the new KPMG Plaza tower.

717 Harwood is home to the headquarters of HilltopSecurities, which is a subsidiary of Hilltop Holdings Inc. Other tenants include Goldman Sachs, Active Network, Lanyon Solutions, Deloitte, Omnitracs, HOK, ReelFX, Asuirty Mortgage and McCall Parkhurst and Horton.

JLL handles the office leasing, Edge Realty Partners handles the retail leasing and Colliers International handles the Property Management.

717 Harwood was certified LEED Gold.

== See also ==
- List of tallest buildings in Dallas
