= Ashok Trivedi =

American businessman and philanthropist

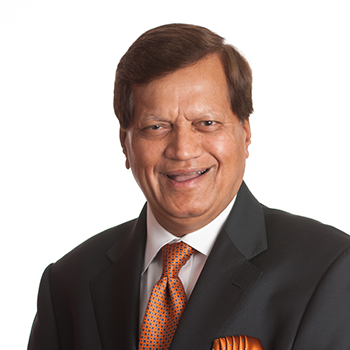
- Born: Lucknow, Uttar Pradesh, India
- Education: Hindu College, Delhi; Delhi University; Ohio University
- Occupations: Entrepreneur; Investor; Philanthropist
- Years active: 1976–present
- Known for: SWAT Capital, IGATE, Mastech Digital, and Ashoka University

Ashok Trivedi is an Indian-American entrepreneur, investor and philanthropist best known as the Co-Founder and Co-Chairman of Mastech Inc. and IGATE. Born in Lucknow, India, Trivedi graduated from the University of Delhi, before moving to the United States of America where he earned his MBA from Ohio University.

Trivedi is currently a Managing Partner at SWAT Capital, and is focused on multiple philanthropic initiatives on behalf of his family foundation. Trivedi is a founder and trustee of Ashoka University which is located in the National Capital Region of India. Ashoka University is a private research university with a liberal arts focus. He currently resides in Pittsburgh, Pennsylvania.

== Early life and education ==
Ashok Trivedi was born in Lucknow, India. He received his bachelor’s from Hindu College, Delhi and master’s in physics from the University of Delhi. In 1973, Trivedi moved to the United States and earned an MBA from Ohio University. Additionally, he has attended the Owner/President Management Program at the Harvard Business School.

== Business career ==
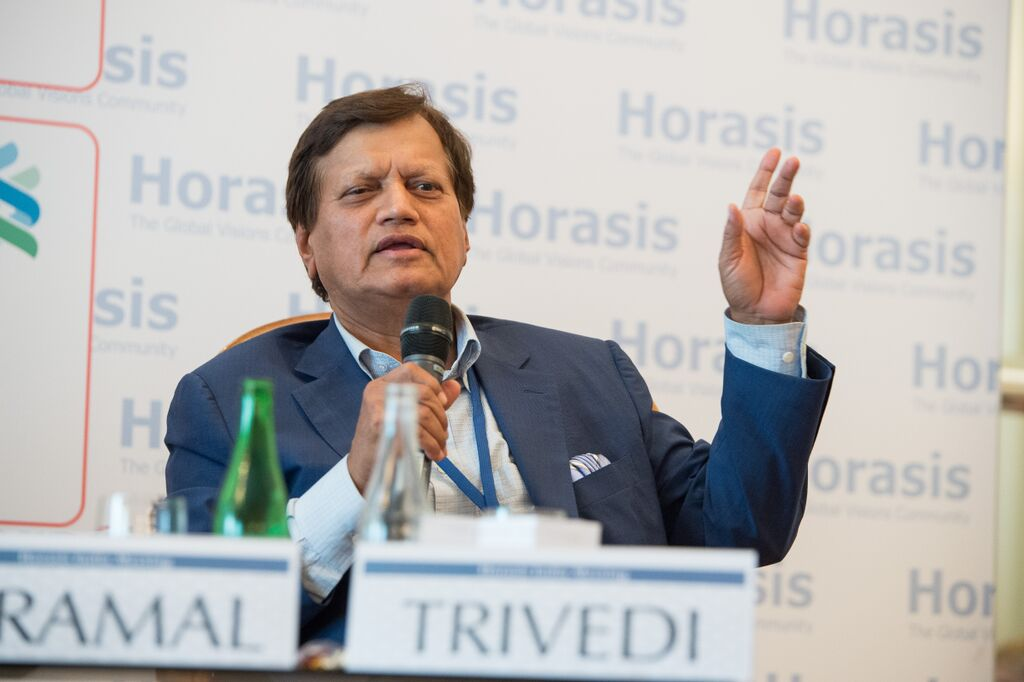
Trivedi at the Horasis India Meeting in 2015.

Ashok Trivedi started his career at Unisys in 1976, where he held various marketing and management positions. He co-founded Mastech/IGATE, which became operational in 1988. Over the next decade, Trivedi focused on growing Mastech as a trusted IT partner to several global corporations.

By the 2000s, the company had expanded to 34 countries across North America, Europe, and Asia. The Indian sub-continent became the company's largest delivery hub. Under his leadership, IGATE recorded revenues of $1.2 billion and grew to 34,000 employees.

The company was featured among the five best companies to work at in India. CareerBliss, based on employee happiness and employee satisfaction quotients, identified IGATE among the twenty-five best companies to work for in the United States of America.

By July 2015, French-IT company, Capgemini completed a $4.2 billion acquisition of IGATE, recorded as one of the largest deals in the Indian information technology sector.

In 2016, Mastech repositioned itself as a digital technologies company, Mastech Digital, which continues to be listed on the New York Stock Exchange as MHH.

In addition to currently being part of Mastech Digital's board of directors, Trivedi also serves as a Managing Partner of SWAT Capital.

== Philanthropy ==
Trivedi established the Trivedi Family Foundation in 2015, which has supported numerous causes related to education, Indo-American relations and cultural inclusivity.

Ashok Trivedi is a Co-Founder and Trustee of Ashoka University, a private research university with a focus on liberal arts, located in the National Capital Region of India. It is recognized by the University Grants Commission in the sub-continent. In 2020, Ashok committed $13.5 million to launch the Trivedi School of Biosciences as a cornerstone to the university's natural sciences program. The school is set to focus on research in emerging areas in biology such as disease biology, inflammation biology, and synthetic biology.

In 2015, the Trivedi Center for Political Data was set up at Ashoka University to help build datasets and authoritative knowledge on India’s political life, and to diffuse the same via an open-access platform. The Center has also partnered with Yale and the University of Michigan.

The Trivedi Family Foundation also supports Project Art, a non-profit program in the United States, to teach after-school art classes to underprivileged youth in public libraries. Trivedi's daughter, Shivani is an active proponent for the cause, and helped establish the Pittsburgh chapter of Project Art. It is also actively involved in supporting the mission of STEM Coding Lab, to provide under-privileged children with computer education to face the digital world.

The Trivedi Family Foundation donated nearly $200,000 to Joe DiMaggeo's Children's Hospital Foundation to support pediatric programs and families.

In late January 2026, the University of Pittsburgh Health Sciences announced the launch of the Trivedi Institute for Space and Global Biomedicine, a $25 million research initiative that studies the biological and medical effects of spaceflight to develop advances in human health on Earth. The Trivedi Family Foundation, which Trivedi leads, provided the majority of the institute’s initial funding. Media coverage described it as one of the first institutes of its kind, and the first in the United States. Trivedi, a physicist by training, has said he hopes the institute will raise Pittsburgh’s global profile in biomedicine and spur new life sciences and space-related companies in the region.

The institute is directed by Kate Rubins, a former NASA astronaut and Pitt professor of computational and systems biology. During a 16-year NASA career she spent 300 days in space across two long-duration missions, conducted four spacewalks, and became the first person to sequence DNA in space. Rubins, who holds a Ph.D. in cancer biology from Stanford University, reportedly chose Pitt over five other offers after retiring from NASA. She is joined by co-director Christopher Mason, a geneticist and space biologist, and two center directors. Afshin Beheshti leads the Center for Space Biomedicine. Sylvain Costes leads the Center for Space Biomanufacturing, Synthetic Biology and Digital Health. All four had collaborated on NASA projects for years before joining the institute. Beheshti came to Pitt in 2024 to lead the Pitt Space initiative, and Anantha Shekhar, Pitt’s senior vice chancellor for the health sciences, credited his work with inspiring the university to build a full institute rather than a single laboratory.

The institute’s research builds on evidence that microgravity and radiation accelerate processes such as cell growth, disease progression and aging-like changes, which astronauts then largely recover from after returning to Earth. Planned areas of study include osteoporosis, chronic back pain, long COVID and ALS. The institute also plans to adapt compact, autonomous medical technologies developed for spaceflight for use in rural communities, disaster zones, military operations and humanitarian settings. One example is remotely guided handheld ultrasound, which astronauts have used in orbit. Its research agenda also includes life-detection projects related to Venus and Mars. Carnegie Mellon University is a founding partner, contributing strengths in artificial intelligence and computation, and the institute plans to expand from an initial group of Northeastern universities into a global network. It is also pursuing agreements with NASA for access to testing facilities, and with commercial spaceflight companies to send experiments into orbit, with missions and projects planned into the 2030s.

Ashok has been a part of the US-India Security Council, USISC, a non-profit organization in the United States that focuses on bolstering security relations between the two countries.

He is associated with the Carnegie Endowment for International Peace, a global network of policy research centers.

Trivedi also promotes cultural inclusivity. He funds Silk Screen, a non-profit media arts organization in Pittsburgh. Trivedi also supported the American India Foundation and Pratham, a non-profit that works towards the provision of quality education for underprivileged children in India.

== Recognition ==
Ashok Trivedi was recognized as the EY Entrepreneur of the Year by Ernst & Young. He has also received several awards for his entrepreneurial skills and efforts by Inc. Magazine, the Association of Indians in America, and the American Society of Engineers of Indian Origin. Additionally, in 2017, Ashok Trivedi received the Banyan Tree Award at a ceremony in Peoria, Illinois. In May 2017, he received the Lifetime Achievement Award along with Sunil Wadhwani from the Pittsburgh Venture Capital Association.

He has also been recognized with the Achievement in Business Award by his alma mater, Ohio University.

Ashok Trivedi is a notable speaker, and was featured at the TiE Global Summit in 2016. He is also a founding/chartered member of TiE Pittsburgh. He has been acknowledged as a global thought leader for his entrepreneurial success by the One Globe Forum. Trivedi also gave the commencement address at Duquesne University.

== Investments ==
Ashok Trivedi is a Managing Partner at SWAT Capital. He invests globally in the public and private markets including primary, secondary, direct and co-investment opportunities. He makes his investments through the Trivedi Family Office.

Trivedi has invested in more than 40 early-stage companies across industries including IT services, software, healthcare, life sciences, social media and financial services.

He is part of the India Angel Network, one of Asia’s largest network of angel investors.
