= Romesh Wadhwani =

Indian-American businessman (born 1947)

Romesh T. Wadhwani
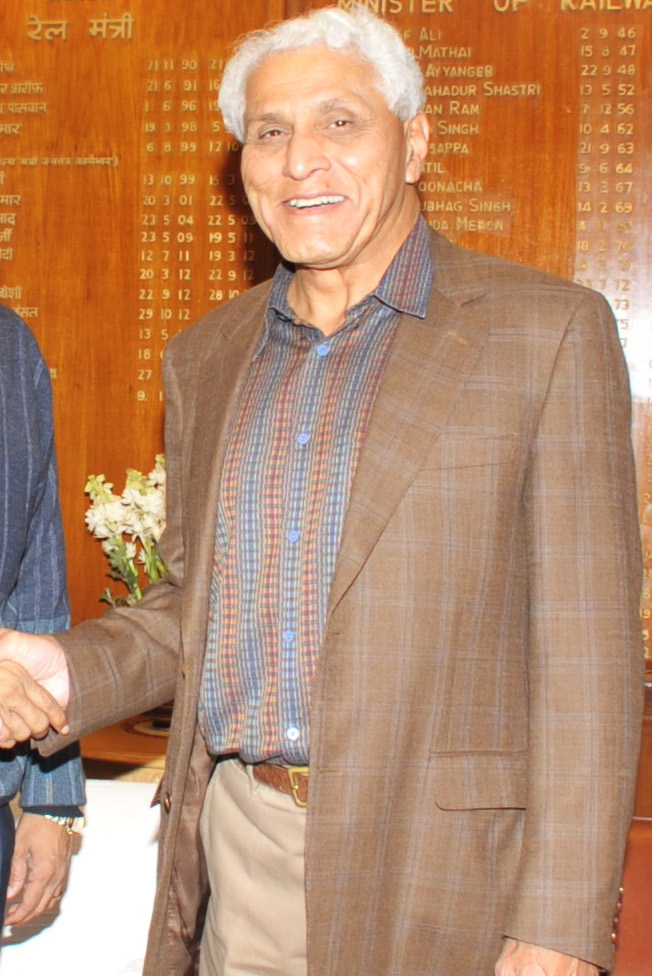
- Dr. Romesh Wadhwani, Wadhwani Foundation, February 17, 2016
- Born: August 25, 1947 (age 79); Karachi, Pakistan
- Citizenship: United States
- Education: IIT Bombay; Carnegie Mellon University
- Known for: Internet companies, philanthropy
- Spouse: Kathleen "Kathy" Wadhwani
- Children: 1 daughter
- Relatives: Sunil Wadhwani (brother)
- Honours: Padma Shri (2020)

Romesh Tekchand Wadhwani (born 1947) is an Indian-American billionaire, businessman and head of investment firm SAIGroup. He is the former chairman and CEO of Symphony Technology Group, a private equity firm for software, Internet and technology services companies, including SurveyMonkey and Onclusive. He established the Wadhwani Foundation for economic development in emerging economies, with an initial focus on India. He was awarded the Padma Shri, India's fourth highest civilian honour, in 2020.

== Early life ==
Romesh T. Wadhwani was born in a Sindhi Hindu family in Karachi, Pakistan, 10 days after the partition of India on 15 August 1947. His family moved to India shorty thereafter. He contracted polio at age 2 and had difficulty getting admission to school. He received a bachelor's degree from the IIT Bombay, and master's and PhD degrees in electrical engineering from Carnegie Mellon University.

== Career ==
For a decade, Wadhwani was the founder, chairman, and CEO of two companies, one (American Robot Corporation) specializing in software and solutions for computer-integrated manufacturing and the other (Compu-Guard Corporation) in technology-enabled energy management.

Wadhwani was then the founder, chairman, and CEO of Aspect Development, Inc., from its startup in 1991 to its acquisition in 1999 by i2 Technologies for $9.3 billion in stock.

Together with his brother, Sunil Wadhwani, he has founded Wadhwani Institute for Artificial Intelligence in Mumbai to develop artificial intelligence solutions for public good.

Wadhwani has invested $1 billion in predictive and generative AI SaaS company SymphonyAI.

== Philanthropy ==
Wadhwani is on the board of trustees of the John F. Kennedy Center for the Performing Arts and the Center for Strategic and International Studies, both in Washington, D.C.

He established the Wadhwani Foundation for economic development in emerging economies in 2000, with an initial focus on India. Initiatives in India include the National Entrepreneurship Network, which has established programs to enable growth-centric entrepreneurship at over 500 universities and colleges; a skills college network to help train and place large numbers of young adults in vocational jobs; an opportunities network for the disabled; and a research initiative in biosciences and biotechnology to help create jobs through innovation. The Foundation has launched a US-India policy initiative, with Rick Inderfurth, previously Assistant Secretary of State, as the Wadhwani Chair at the Center for Strategic and International Studies, a policy think tank in Washington, D.C., and Hemant Singh, former Indian Ambassador to Japan, as the head of the Wadhwani program at ICRIER, a major policy institute in Delhi. Wadhwani won the India Abroad Award for Lifetime Achievement in 2013.

In 2012, Wadhwani inaugurated a new research centre at the National Centre for Biological Sciences (NCBS) in Bangalore, named after his late mother, Shanta Wadhwani.

== Personal life ==
He is married to Kathleen "Kathy" Wadhwani, and they live in Palo Alto, California. They have one daughter.

== Honours ==
Wadhwani was awarded an honorary doctorate by IIT Bombay in 2018. He was awarded the Padma Shri for Trade & Industry, the fourth highest civilian honour of India, in 2020.
