= Vivek Gupta (business executive) =

Indian-American business executive (b. 1963)

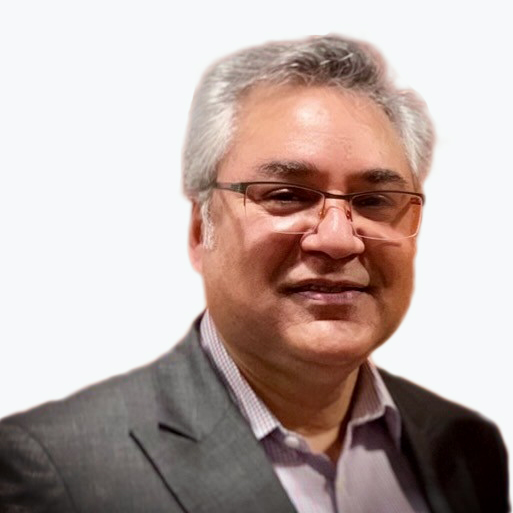
- Born: Vivek Gupta; 1963 (age 62–63)
- Education: IIT Delhi
- Occupation: Advisor and Mentor; former Chief Executive Officer
- Years active: 1984–present
- Known for: Mentor, Advisor, Former President and CEO, and Director on the Board of Mastech Digital

Vivek Gupta (born 1963) is an Indian-born American business leader. He was the president and CEO, and director on the board of Mastech Digital for nine years. He currently advises and mentors companies and corporate leaders on growth and transformation.

== Career ==
After graduating from the Indian Institute of Technology, Gupta started his career with Zensar Technologies, an information technology and infrastructure services company, in 1984.

In 1993, he moved to England to expand the company's reach across Central and Eastern Europe, the UK, and the Nordics.

In 2001, Gupta moved to Chicago, IL to head Zensar's Global Outsourcing Services business, providing Application Portfolio Management (APM) and Business Process Outsourcing (BPO) services to global customers. Following his stint in the US, Gupta returned to India in 2009 as Zensar's Chief Operating Officer.

In November 2010, Zensar announced its acquisition of the US IT firm, Akibia Inc, and appointed Gupta as its Executive Chairman. Gupta was credited for the integration between the two diverse company cultures. As a part of his new role, he contributed to scaling the IMS (Infrastructure Management Services) business. Under his leadership, Zensar witnessed a company-wide growth since the acquisition was first announced, with 8,000 employees across 20 different locations worldwide. The company was also valued at $500 million in 2015.

In 2014, Gupta led a partnership between Zensar and the Harvard School of Business.

In October 2015, after nearly 32 years with Zensar, Gupta took charge as the chief executive – Americas of RPG Enterprises, a $3 billion group with a presence in automotive tires, pharmaceuticals, information technology, plantations, and infrastructure, among many others. Zensar Technologies is a wholly owned subsidiary of the RPG Group.

In March 2016, Gupta joined Mastech, as its president, CEO, and member of the board.

Later in July 2017, Gupta led Mastech Digital's acquisition of InfoTrellis, a Canada-based data management and analytics services company. The deal was valued at $55 million. This venture strengthened the company's focus on digital transformation services.

In April 2018, Gupta expanded Mastech Digital's presence in India with a 20,000 sq. ft. office in Chennai, India. In January 2019, he further expanded the company's presence in the subcontinent with a 40,000 sq. ft. facility in Noida, India. At the same time, he also announced the company's intention to acquire more firms in line with its vision to become a digital technologies company.

In October 2020, Vivek led Mastech Digital's acquisition of Amberleaf Partners, a specialist Customer Experience company to strengthen the company's capabilities in CX.

In May 2023, Vivek Gupta expanded Mastech Digital's staffing services into Engineering Staffing. As part of this, the company offered top engineering talent to businesses seeking highly skilled engineering professionals to drive their innovation and growth.

On 28 February 2025, Vivek Gupta stepped down as the CEO after nine years of leading the company to pursue his interests in mentoring and advising companies and leaders on growth and transformation.

== Recognition ==
Six times since he joined as the CEO, Gupta was ranked amongst the "100 Most Influential Leaders in Staffing Industry" by Staffing Industry Analysts. (2017, 2018, 2021, 2023, 2024, and 2025)

Gupta has been named to the list the Pittsburgh “Smart 50 Award” for five years in a row, being recognized for his ability to effectively build and lead a successful organization in the region. (2018, 2019, 2020, 2021, and 2022)

In January 2022, he was recognized for the World Staffing Award under Top 100 Staffing Leaders to watch in 2022.
