= ReserveAmerica =

This is the organization which is offering License processing any Institution

Coordinates: 32.7858°N 96.7979°W

- Founded: 1984
- Headquarters: 717 North Harwood Street, Suite 2500, Dallas, Texas
- Owner: Aspira (since 2017)

ReserveAmerica, provides online campsite reservations and license processing for state, provincial, private, and local government parks, campgrounds, and conservation agencies in North America.

== History ==
ReserveAmerica was founded in 1984 as a software development company specializing in reservations for the local recreation industry. In 1992, the company developed a reservation system for state and federal park systems. ReserveAmerica provided reservations services for the National Park Service starting in 1997. In 1999, the company contracted with the state Department of Natural Resources.

In June, 2005, the United States Forest Service contracted with the company to provide a single-source federal recreation information and reservation service. In addition, ReserveAmerica also served the National Park Service, the Bureau of Land Management, the Bureau of Reclamation, the U.S. Army Corps of Engineers. Booz Allen Hamilton won the federal contract in 2016.

In 2001, it was acquired by InterActiveCorp. In 2009, InterActiveCorp sold ReserveAmerica to ACTIVE Network. In 2017, Global Payments acquired the Communities and Sports divisions of ACTIVE Network. ACTIVE Network's Outdoors division, including ReserveAmerica, spun off to become the independent company Aspira, headquartered in Dallas, Texas, with nine offices in the United States, Canada and Asia.
