= Lanyon Solutions =

Technology company providing software and solutions for the hospitality industry

Lanyon Solutions Inc.
- Type: Private
- Industry: Meetings, event and travel software
- Founded: 1984
- Defunct: 2017
- Headquarters: Dallas, TX
- Key people: David Bonnette (CEO); Anthony Miller (CMO); John Mills (CFO); John Pulling (CTO); Dirk Wakeham (COO)
- Products: event management, meeting management, corporate travel management, hotel RFP software
- Owner: Vista Equity Partners
- Website: www.lanyon.com

Lanyon Solutions, Inc. was a privately owned, software-as-a-service (SaaS) company that provided cloud-based software to manage meetings, events and travel. Lanyon's software supported a range of clients including corporations, hotels, associations, tradeshows, convention and visitor bureaus (CVBs), and intermediaries in the meetings, events and travel space. It was merged into Cvent in 2017.

== History ==
Lanyon Solutions was formed from the combination of two companies, Active Network Business Solutions Group and Lanyon, by Vista Equity Partners in 2014. Two acquisitions added Passkey and GenieConnect in 2014. Nevertheless, the solutions and services offered by the individual companies date back decades.

=== Lanyon ===
Lanyon was founded in 1984 by Nick Lanyon in Irving, Texas as a provider of software focused on corporate transient travel. In 2009, Lanyon received $10 million in funding from Frontier Capital, Charlotte, North Carolina–based private equity company to expand Lanyon's product, customer and sales support.

The company was purchased by Vista Equity Partners in December 2012, signaling the exit of Frontier Capital's investment in the company.

=== Passkey International ===
Founded in 1996, Waltham, Massachusetts–based Passkey International provided hotel reservation technology to hotels and event planners.

In April 2014, Lanyon acquired Passkey, which complemented Lanyon's existing event solutions. This included Passkey's GroupMAX technology, which enabled hotels and destination marketing organizations to drive more revenue on group reservations while easing manual tasks associated with managing group room blocks.

=== StarCite ===
StarCite was founded in 1999 as a spinoff from McGettigan Partners. The company expanded its focus from desktop consolidation to meetings technology after acquiring attendee applications provider RegWeb in 2002 and attendee product provider b-there in 2003.

In 2006, StarCite merged with OnVantage Inc., which was formed through a merger between seeUthere Technologies and PlanSoft in 2004, bringing together two leaders in meetings technology. The merged company took the StarCite name.

Products included StarCite Mobile attendee for attendee networking, 1:1 meetings to schedule meetings, Business Intelligence for meetings data analytics, suite of SMM applications, and a supplier database.

=== Active Network Business Solutions Group ===
In 2008, The Active Network acquired Boulder, Colorado–based RegOnline, an online registration company, and Lindon, Utah–based WingateWeb, which provided large enterprise event management software.

In January 2012, Active Network acquired StarCite for $57.7 million to form the Business Solutions group to offer SMM and event marketing software for all meetings and events. In addition to StarCite for SMM, the Business Solutions group technology offering included ActiveWorks Conference for conferences, RegOnline for online registration, and StarCite Supplier Marketplace for hotel and venue sourcing.

In September 2013, Active Network was acquired by Vista Equity Partners for over $1 billion, which would return the public company to private status. In February 2014, Lanyon was paired with Active Network's Business Solutions Group and consolidated under the Lanyon name.

=== GenieConnect ===
GenieConnect was founded in 2010 with teams in the US, UK and APAC. Previously known as GenieMobile until March 2013, UK-based GenieConnect offered an enterprise-level mobile event technology. Products included SmartConnect which provides content based on attendee app usage, iBeacon-enabled audience response solution, marketing to track attendee behaviors and send messages to audiences, and OmniStream Event Wall to aggregate social and event activity.

GenieConnect's mobile event technology is used by associations, corporations, exhibitors and expo companies. For Cisco Live 2014, GenieConnect achieved the following results: 11,000 attendee profiles updates, 7,500 access the interactive maps, 167,00 plus favorited content, and the mobile app received a user rating of 4.5 out of 5 stars in Cisco's post-event survey.

Acquired by Lanyon in December 2014, GenieConnect's mobile technology was already integrated with many of Lanyon's existing solutions.

=== Lanyon Solutions ===
Formed in early 2014 with the merger of Active Network Business Solutions Group and Lanyon, Lanyon Solutions expanded its software offering focus through several key mergers and acquisitions. The company acquired group hotel reservations company Passkey in April 2014 and mobile application company GenieConnect in December 2014.

Lanyon Solutions relocated its headquarters to downtown Dallas, Texas, with offices in Draper, Utah; London, UK; Philadelphia, Pennsylvania; Singapore, Singapore; and Waltham, Massachusetts.

== Products and Services ==
Lanyon serves the meetings, events and travel industries with a variety of software products for both businesses and hotels. Lanyon has a large focus on enterprise, serving more than 80% of the Fortune 100, 10,000 small and medium-sized businesses and over 100,000 hotels. The company's solutions are designed to manage costs, spend and data related to meetings and hotels, while enabling hoteliers to offer venues and services to corporations and associations.

Introduced in 2013, Lanyon Smart Events Cloud solution brings together strategic meetings management and event marketing technologies into a single solution. Smart Events Cloud solution includes these products:

- Lanyon Events (formerly Conference) – event marketing and conference technology, with check-in, registration, exhibitor resource center, speaker resource center, lead retrieval capabilities, and attendee data
- Lanyon Meetings (formerly StarCite) – strategic meetings management technology with virtual meeting venue tours The product is designed to provide visibility and automate the RFP process, help customers save money, and promote corporate policy compliance
- Lanyon Mobile (formerly GenieConnect) – mobile apps which can be integrated with the company's Smart Events Cloud and registration tool RegOnline The technology offers iBeacon polling and surveys, OmniStream social activity, and attendee tracking
- RegOnline by Lanyon – online registration software for SMBs and associations with venue sourcing
- Lanyon Travel – software to manage corporate transient travel

For hoteliers, Lanyon provides RFP management software to respond to meetings and transient eRFPs and hotel booking systems. Product offerings include:

- Lanyon Passkey – group reservation system for hotels and destinations This includes technology designed to help hotels upsell additional services to meeting guests. Lanyon plans to integrate Passkey's hotel reservation technology, which allows guests to book hotel rooms online, into its Smart Events Cloud solution.
- Lanyon Group (formerly MarketView) – software for hotels to manage request for proposals (RFPs) for group meetings and events
- Lanyon Transient – software for hotels to manage RFPs for corporate transient travel

== Patents ==
- In 2009, StarCite received a patent for “System and Method for Enterprise Event Marketing and Management Automation”, patent number 7,523,385.
- In 2011, StarCite received a patent for “Event Planning System”, patent number 8,065,171.
- In 2012, Lanyon received a patent for its rate auditing process.

== Awards ==
- In November 2011, StarCite received the 2011 Innovation Award from Cisco.
- In January 2013, JR Sherman, SVP of Active Network Business Solutions group, was recognized as one of 25 Most Influential Business Travel Executives of 2012.
- In November 2013, GenieConnect received the EIBTM technology award for the company's MarketingConnect data analytics tool.
- In 2014, Adobe Summit and Active Conference received the Best Overall Use of Data Collection Technology award.
- In June 2014, JR Sherman, President of Lanyon, was recognized as a 2014 Changemaker for meetings and events.
