= Fellowship One =

FellowshipOne
- Type: Privately held
- Industry: Church software
- Headquarters: U.S.
- Owner: Ministry Brands
- Website: www.fellowshipone.com

FellowshipOne, formerly Fellowship Technologies, is church software owned by Ministry Brands.

== History ==
In 1999, Fellowship Church of Grapevine, Texas, began developing software to manage their church operations. Over time, the church decided that they could not continue to develop the software and approached Jeff Hook about taking the product to market.

In 2004, Hook founded Fellowship Technologies to launch Fellowship One's church management software in Irving, Texas.

In February 2011, Fellowship Technologies was acquired by the ACTIVE Network. Soon after, ACTIVE followed up by purchasing Connection Power in July of the same year. ACTIVE executed yet one more acquisition in October 2011 when they purchased ServiceU, allowing the company to expand their service offerings through Fellowship One.

In March 2016, Fellowship One announced that ACTIVE Networks LLC finalized the sale of its Faith division and the Fellowship One brand to Ministry Brands of Knoxville, Tennessee.
