= Achyut Palav =

Indian calligrapher

- Born: Mumbai, India
- Education: Sir J.J. Institute of Applied Art
- Awards: Padma Shri

Achyut Ramchandra Palav (born 1960) is an Indian calligrapher and educator known for his contributions to the art of Indian scripts.

== Life ==
He graduated from the Sir J.J. Institute of Applied Art in Mumbai in 1982. Palav studied under R.K. Joshi, a prominent typographer and calligrapher.

He received a research scholarship in 1984 to examine the Modi script, a historical Indian script. Palav's calligraphy is characterized by its expressive style and use of unconventional tools, including toothbrushes and spatulas.

== Awards ==
He received Padma Shri Award, in 2025, India's fourth highest civilian honor, for his contributions to the art of calligraphy.
