= Inclusive entrepreneurship =

Inclusive entrepreneurship is a model of entrepreneurship that encourages individuals of a diverse background to embrace entrepreneurship for their own economic advantage. These may be from groups that typically face discrimination and disadvantage. It is about a set of attitudes, competences and skills which allow people to turn their dreams into concrete projects or “enterprises” and then see these through to fruition. It is about more than starting an individual business. Inclusive entrepreneurship can be applied to self-employment, starting or growing micro or small enterprises and to social enterprise using business based approaches driven by social mission. Indeed, the personal qualities required for entrepreneurship are essential for success in the knowledge economy – whether this be in the private or public sectors.

The use of the word 'inclusive' indicates a belief that entrepreneurship is for all and that the personal qualities and conditions required for entrepreneurship are not the prerogative of a privileged, highly educated few. Indeed, millions of people across the globe take complex decisions, manage risk, find new innovative solutions, and collaborate with others just to survive in their daily lives. However the obstacles and risk they face when trying to make the leap from survival to long-term sustainability are proportionally far greater than those involved in launching a new company on the stock exchange.

== EU community initiative ==
Major progress on inclusive entrepreneurship has been made through the EU's EQUAL Community Initiative which included a theme on business creation that was taken up in approximately half the EU Member States. This action research has led to the development of a community of practice on inclusive entrepreneurship called COPIE. COPIE was led by Flanders and Germany with partners in Spain, Portugal, and the UK and observers in France, the Netherlands, Ireland, the Czech Republic and Romania. COPIE developed a series of tools to facilitate the assessment of enterprise support systems from the point of view of a wide range of specific groups (e.g. women, minority ethnic groups, migrants, people with disabilities, young people and older people). Much of its learning has been capitalised on a wiki at www.wikipreneurship.eu.

Following the end of EQUAL, COPIE 2, a learning network under the Learning for Change programme, has been established. Again led by Germany, it includes Flanders, Wallonia, the Czech Republic, Spain, Andalucía and Lithuania. It has working groups on:

- policy co-ordination
- access to finance
- entrepreneurship education
- coaching and mentoring
- quality management and inclusive business support
- a European diagnostic & benchmarking tool

== Syracuse University project ==
Inclusive Entrepreneurship is also the name of a project which evolved from the Start-Up NY Pilot Project funded by Office of Disability Employment Policy by DOL in Onondaga County, Syracuse University.

It defines inclusive entrepreneurship as:

A strategy and process for assisting people with diverse disabilities and/or economic and social disadvantages to become entrepreneurs through business planning training, use of customized business development goal and support planning, and access to financial resources utilizing the resources of diverse public and private partners working within a consensus-driven, collaborative framework.

Definition courtesy of Gary Shaheen from BBI and Mirza Tihic from Whitman School of Management (Syracuse University).

Inclusive Entrepreneurship utilizes practices and partnerships developed through the three year (2006-2009) US Department of Labor/Office of Disability Employment Policy (ODEP)-funded “Start-Up NY” program and the five year (2009-2014) Small Business Association's Program for Investment in Micro-entrepreneurs (SBA-PRIME). Start-Up NY brought a personal multidisciplinary team consisting of business consultants, disability experts, benefits counselors, mentors, and any identified peer and family supports together with the participant to merge their knowledge and resources, and provide a customized micro-enterprise training, assistance, and counseling resource.

Inclusive Entrepreneurship is led by Syracuse University and its Whitman School of Management/Department of Entrepreneurship and Emerging Enterprises (EEE) together with the Burton Blatt Institute (BBI). However, the success of Inclusive Entrepreneurship as a university and community-based initiative is also based upon the development of key partnerships that are necessary to helping entrepreneurs develop their businesses. These can include the local Small Business Development Center (SBDC) and One Stop Career Center as well as key local stakeholders that work with low-income individuals, including low-income people with disabilities, to help them achieve economic self-sufficiency.
