= Indian Angel Network =

Private angel investors network in India

- Abbreviation: IAN
- Founder: Saurabh Srivastava, Padmaja Ruparel, Raman Roy
- Founded at: New Delhi, India
- Type: Investment Fund
- Region served: India, United States, United Kingdom, and Israel (planned)
- Official language: English
- Website: https://www.indianangelnetwork.com/

Indian Angel Network (IAN) is a group of primarily Indian angel investors funding early-stage startups. The group had 450 members from 11 countries in 2017. The members include Ajai Chowdhry, Rajan Anandan, and Anand Ladsairya. The group has invested in companies, such as PregBuddy and SuperProfs. In 2018, one of its founder Padmaja Ruparel was ranked amongst Fortune magazine's list of The Most Powerful Women in India.
