= Patni Computer Systems =

IT company based in India

- Company type: Public
- Traded as: BSE: 532517 NYSE: PTI
- Industry: IT services
- Founded: 10 February 1978
- Founder: Narendra Patni
- Defunct: 2012
- Fate: Acquired by IGATE
- Headquarters: Electronic City, Bangalore, India
- Services: IT and outsourcing services
- Revenue: ₹2,164 crore (US$230 million) (2012)
- Net income: ₹386 crore (US$40 million) (2012)
- Number of employees: 18,273 (2011)

Patni Computer Systems Limited was a provider of IT services and business solutions founded by Narendra Patni. It merged with IGATE Corporation in 2011 and operated under the name IGATE Patni until 2012. The company has employed over 18,000 people in 23 international offices across the Americas, Europe, and the Asia-Pacific region, as well as offshore development centres in eight cities in India. Patni's clients included more than 360 Fortune 1000 companies.

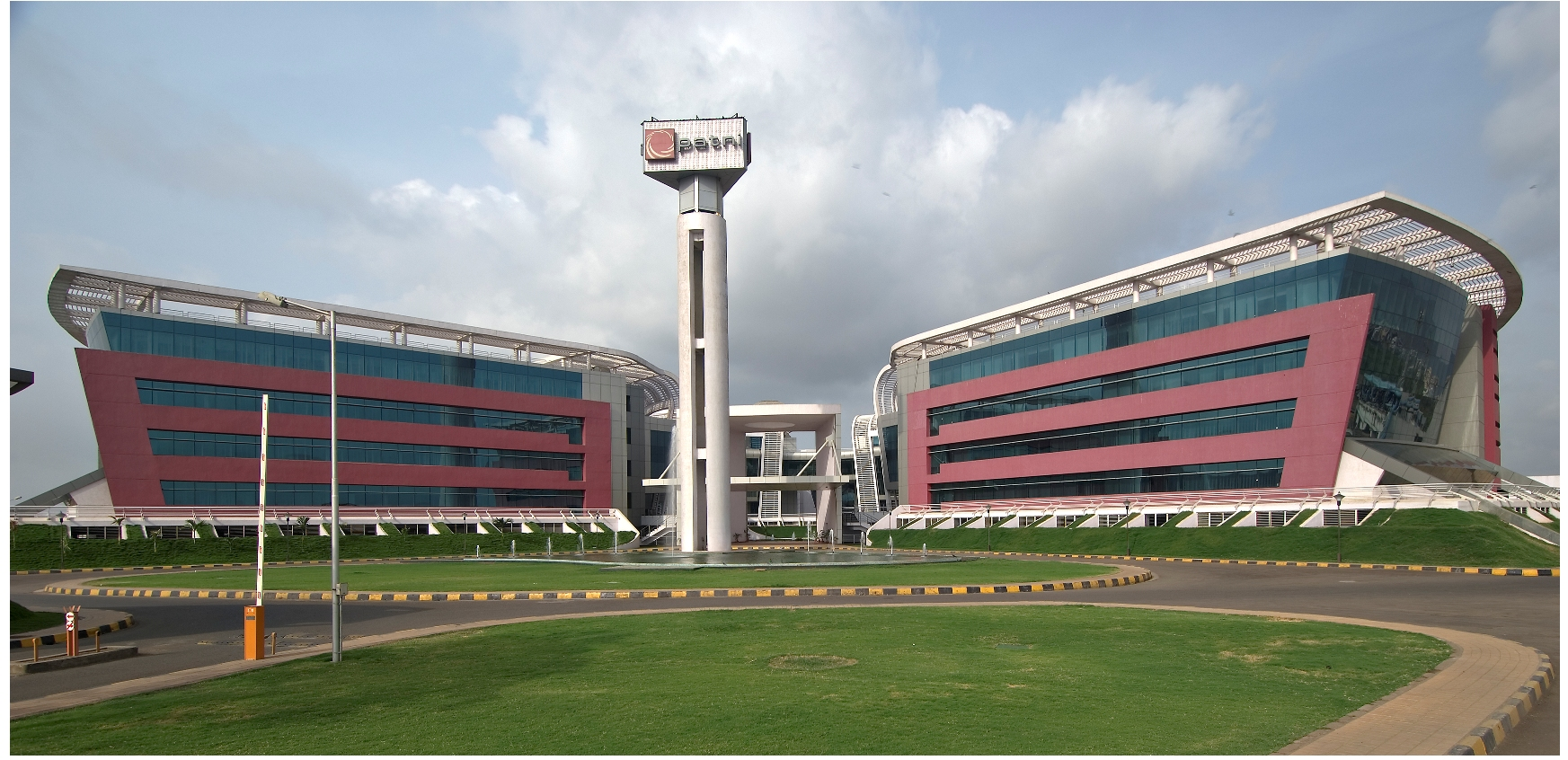
Patni Knowledge Park, Airoli, Navi Mumbai (2010)

In 2009, Patni Computer Systems appointed Jeya Kumar as the new CEO following a two-year global search. After taking charge, Kumar traveled extensively and met with clients, leading the company through its "Patni 2.0" phase with a vision for the company's future.

== Acquisition by iGATE Corporation ==
On 10 January 2011, iGATE announced that it had reached a definitive agreement to buy shares of the major shareholders of Patni Computer Systems Limited. These shares comprise 63% of Patni's total outstanding shares.

== Acquisitions and OEM agreements ==
- April 2003: Acquired "The Reference Inc.", a company incorporated in Massachusetts, USA for a consideration of about US$7.5 million, through its wholly owned US subsidiary, Patni Computer Systems Inc. The Reference Inc. has provided Patni with specialised skills and domain expertise in the financial services industry segment.
- August 2004: Patni and InteQ Corporation announced an OEM agreement which would enable Patni to provide more extensive Infrastructure Management Services (IMS) and further tap into the expanding IMS market estimated to reach $19.5 billion by 2007.
- November 2004: Acquired "Cymbal Corporation" for a sum of ₹300 crore (US$31 million) million. Cymbal's acquisition allowed Patni to enter the IT services market in the telecom vertical, gaining expertise and operations in the provision of services to clients in the telecommunications industry.
- June 2006: Acquired "ZAiQ Technologies", a design and verification company, in Woburn, Massachusetts. Through the transaction, Patni obtained ZAiQ's Application-specific integrated circuit (ASIC) design capabilities and Intellectual Property (IP), as well as expertise in Field-programmable gate array (FPGA) and System-on-a-chip (SoC) technologies.
- July 2007: Acquired Europe-based "Logan-Orviss International (LOI)", a leading independent specialist telecommunications consulting services company. The consideration includes an upfront cash payment on completion of the transaction as well as performance-linked incentive payments on achieving financial targets over a three-year period. LOI ended a profitable year with revenues of Euro 11.8 Million in 2006.
- July 2007: Acquired N.J.-based "Taratec Development Corp." through Patni Computer Systems Inc. a wholly owned subsidiary of the company, for an aggregate price of $27.2 million in cash including contingent consideration. With more than $20m in annual revenue, Taratec is a leading consulting company in the life sciences industry providing integrated business, information technology, and regulatory compliance products and services.
