= Lead retrieval =

Method of capturing and processing sales leads

Lead retrieval is a method for capturing and processing sales leads generated at an event, trade show, or conference.

Lead retrieval tools connect to a database containing the contact details of event attendees, which the attendees provided when they registered for the event. Event attendees wear a badge during the event, which features a barcode, ID number or QR code. Exhibitors at the event use lead retrieval devices to scan the code or number, to digitally collect that person’s data from the registration database.

Lead retrieval provides exhibitors with attendees’ full registration data. As well as their contact details, this often includes job title, company name and company size. This data is predefined by the event organiser, who is responsible for collecting attendee registration data before the event. This means exhibitors receive a lot of data about each attendee, but they cannot choose which data they receive, or to change any questions to make the data more relevant to their needs. Other event lead capture methods provide more flexibility.

Event organisers send exhibitors the data from the attendees’ badges after the event.

== Lead retrieval tools ==
There are two common types of lead retrieval tools:

- Trade show badge scanner - a handheld device which exhibitors use to scan attendees’ badges. These devices are provided by the event organiser for exhibitors to hire during the event.
- Lead retrieval apps - for some events, the organisers provide a dedicated mobile app for attendees and exhibitors to use. An app can be installed on exhibitors’ own devices, meaning they don’t need to hire additional hardware during the event.

== Types of technology ==
- Barcode
- Magnetic stripe
- Mobile app
- QR Code
- RFID

== See also ==
- Trade fair
- Lead generation
