= Fitness app =

Mobile application used for fitness purposes

A fitness app is an application that can be downloaded on any mobile device and used anywhere to get fit. Fitness apps are designed to help with exercise, other types of physical training, nutrition and diet, and other ways to get fit.

As of 2015, the number of health-related apps released on iPhone (iOS) and Android had reached more than 165,000. Apps can perform various functions such as allowing users to set fitness goals, tracking caloric intake, gathering workout ideas, and sharing progress on social media to facilitate healthy behavior change. They can be used as a platform to promote healthy behavior change with personalized workouts, fitness advice and nutrition plans. Fitness apps can work in conjunction with wearable devices to synchronize their health data to third-party devices for easier accessibility. Through using gamification elements and creating competition among friends and family, fitness apps can help incentive users to be more motivated. Running and workout apps allow users to run or work out to music in the form of DJ mixes that can be personalized based on the user's steps per minute, heart rate or ideal cadence thus boosting and enhancing performance during exercise.

Recent advancements have seen fitness apps evolve to utilize artificial intelligence to provide even more personalized fitness guidance. Utilizing symbolic AI, some apps now interpret physical activity and sedentary behavior guidelines from organizations like the WHO and ACSM to offer tailored exercise recommendations, enhancing the precision of fitness plans.

== Calorie Counter ==
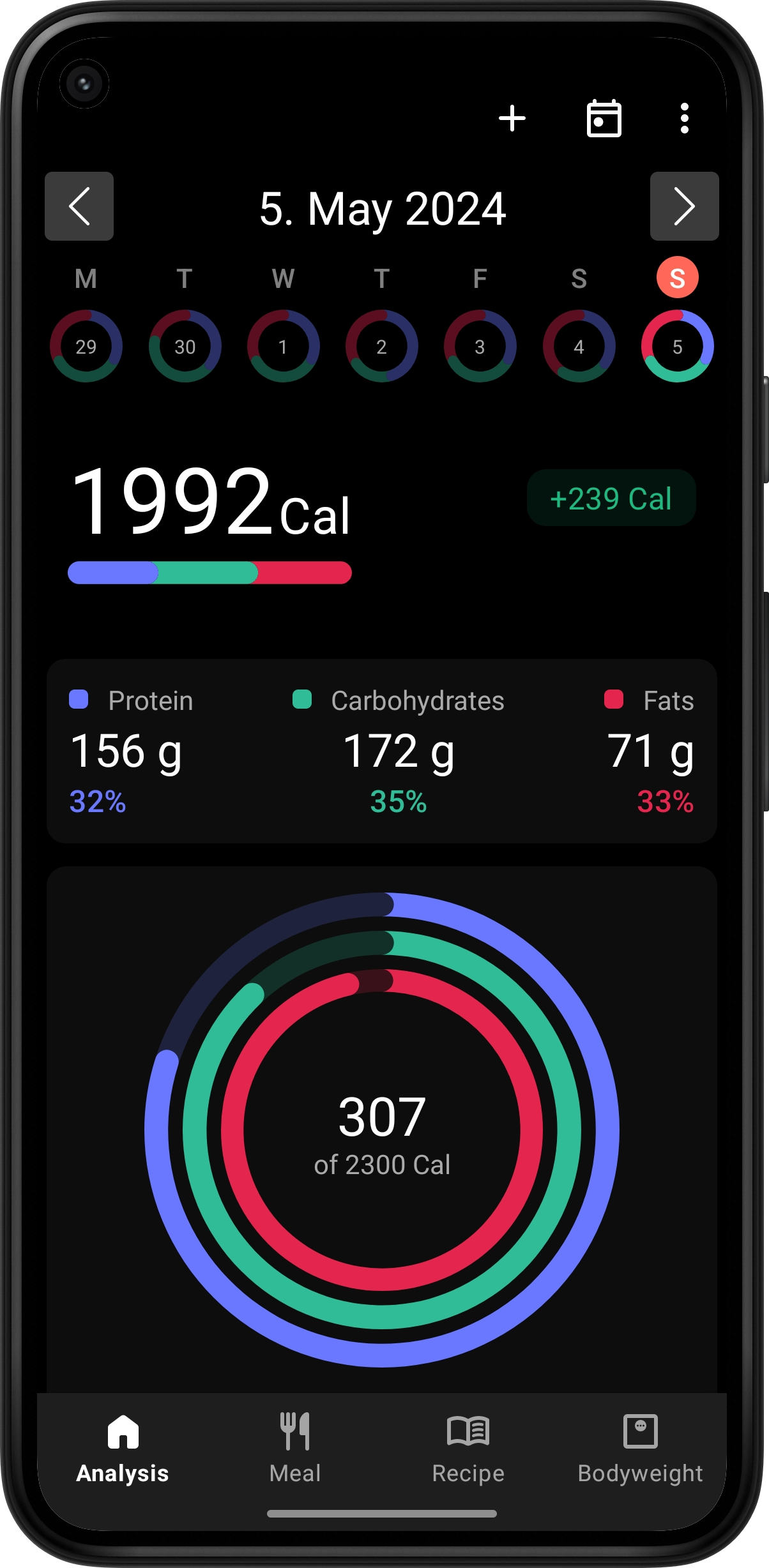
Calorie counter - summary of calorie and macronutrient intake. "Cal" (with uppercase C) denotes the kilocalorie

A calorie counter is a software application or device that can be used to record and evaluate a person's daily diet in terms of nutritional values such as calories, macronutrients and micronutrients. Body weight and physical activity may also be monitored. Their use is intended to help reduce body weight.

=== Development ===
Manual "calorie counting" is based on nutritional calorie tables in book form and on the nutritional information on product packaging. With the advent of smartphones, "calorie counter" apps have simplified the process. The smartphone camera captures the barcode of a product and the nutritional information is provided from a database. Smartphone apps have made counting calories extremely easy. Users can now scan a barcode or enter the name of a food to get its nutritional information.

=== Features ===
The user records every food eaten, including the quantity, in order to determine their total calories and nutrient intake and compare them with their target. They can enter their current body weight into the app every few days and later draw conclusions about the effectiveness of their diet. To record calorie consumption, the apps can connect to the interfaces of third-party fitness trackers, access the phone's activity sensor or record activity manually.

=== Privacy ===
Most calorie counter applications require a user account. Meal and body weight entries are stored on a server of the provider, personalized profiles are created with sensitive data that are at risk of unauthorized access. Applications without registration are more secure in this respect, but have no server-based data backup.

=== Available evidence ===
A Cochrane meta-analysis (2024) of 18 studies with a total of 2700 people showed that there was little or no change in participants' weight after two years. Effects on well-being and quality of life are low or non-existent. The apps performed just as well as personal coaching, "no app" or "usual care". However, the evidence is still very weak and a large number of studies have been announced or are ongoing.

== See also ==
- Exercise and music
- List of fitness apps
