= Sunil Wadhwani =

Indian entrepreneur

- Born: Sunil Tekchand Wadhwani; 1952 or 1953 (age 73–74); Delhi, India
- Education: IIT Madras; Carnegie Mellon University
- Occupations: Entrepreneur; Investor; Philanthropist
- Years active: 1981–present
- Known for: Co-founding Mastech Digital and IGATE
- Spouse: Nita Wadhwani
- Children: 2
- Relatives: Romesh Wadhwani (brother)

Sunil Tekchand Wadhwani is an Indian American businessman and philanthropist. He is the co-founder and CEO of Mastech, Inc. and IGATE. Born in Delhi, India, Wadhwani graduated from the Indian Institute of Technology, Madras, before moving to the United States to earn a degree from Carnegie Mellon University.

Wadhwani is the managing partner at SWAT Capital. He resides in Pittsburgh, Pennsylvania.

== Early life ==
Sunil Wadhwani was born in Delhi, India, and is the brother of Indian-born American billionaire, Romesh Wadhwani.

In 1974, Sunil received a bachelor's degree from IIT Madras. He obtained a master's degree from Carnegie Mellon University, Pittsburgh in 1976.

== Philanthropy ==
In 2000, Wadhwani and his family established the Wadhwani Impact Trust to leverage innovation to transform the lives and communities of the world's most vulnerable populations. The nonprofit supports two organizations in India and other US charities.

=== Wadhwani Initiative for Sustainable Healthcare (WISH) ===
The Wadhwani Initiative for Sustainable Healthcare (WISH) was founded in 2014 by Sunil Wadhwani to transform the primary healthcare system in low-income areas of India and other developing countries using innovation and technology.

WISH works with healthcare innovators, the government, and other private sector partners. to support over 1,000 digital health and wellness centers in India. These centers have served over 30 million patients with free healthcare. WISH also established an Innovation Unit at the National Health Authority in India to mainstream digital health innovations such as point-of-care-services, smart clinics, and e-health modules.

WISH is currently present in several states in India including Assam, Rajasthan, Madhya Pradesh, Uttar Pradesh, and Delhi.

=== Wadhwani Institute for Artificial Intelligence (WIAI) ===
In February 2018, Wadhwani, along with his brother, Romesh, founded the institute to develop and deploy transformative solutions using artificial intelligence, machine learning, data sciences, and related areas to address societal challenges in domains such as health, agriculture, infrastructure, education, and more.

WIAI, led by a team of more than 200 AI / ML experts, has developed over 30 AI solutions being scaled across various states in India. These solutions include smart differential diagnosis enabling over 5 million AI-powered consultations, a system that helps predict high risk pregnancies and suggest interventions affecting 30+ million women around the world each year, a suite of TB solutions impacting over 2.6 million people, and an AI-powered tool for agricultural pest management being used by 33,000 farmers across 6 states to protect crops.

=== Wadhwani School of Data Science and AI ===
Sunil Wadhwani, through the Wadhwani Impact Trust, endowed ₹110 crore to the IIT Madras to establish the Wadhwani School of Data Science and AI. The school will offer various graduate and postgraduate courses and run a Joint MSc program in Data Science and AI with the University of Birmingham, U.K.

=== Vibrant Pittsburgh (VP) ===
In 2010, Wadhwani co-founded Vibrant Pittsburgh. Vibrant Pittsburgh is an economic development non-profit catalyzing workplace diversity in the Pittsburgh region by providing resources and partnering with the business community. It trains over 2,000 employees annually with the goal of measurable progress toward a more diverse, equitable, inclusive, and attractive organizations for the talent of today and tomorrow.

== 2070 Health ==
Wadhwani, through his venture capital firm W Health Ventures, has invested $30 million in 2070 Health, a platform that creates new health companies to improve healthcare accessibility and affordability in India. 2070 Health has launched three companies to date: ElevateNow, Nivaan Care, and Reveal HealthTech.

== Other ==
Wadhwani is or has been a trustee or director of Carnegie Mellon University, George Washington University, The US Federal Reserve Bank (Pittsburgh Branch), United Way Worldwide, UPMC Health System, Allegheny Conference on Community Development, and Pittsburgh Cultural Trust.

== Business career ==
In 1981, he founded UroTec Systems Corp, and served as its president and CEO until 1986.

Following his stint with UroTec, he co-founded Mastech Digital Inc., formerly Mastech Inc., serving as its chairman until September 1996. Annualized growth of 56% over three years in the late 1990s landed the company on BusinessWeek's Hot 100 Growth List.

By the 2000s, the company had expanded to 34 countries in North America, Europe, and Asia. The Indian sub-continent became the company's largest delivery hub. Under his leadership, IGATE recorded revenues of $1.2 billion and grew to 34,000 employees.

The company was featured among the five best companies to work at in India. CareerBliss - based on employee happiness and satisfaction quotients - featured IGATE among the twenty-five best companies to work for in the United States of America.

By July 2015, French IT company, Capgemini completed a $4 billion acquisition of IGATE, recorded as one of the largest deals in the Indian information technology sector.

In 2016, Mastech repositioned itself as a digital technologies company - Mastech Digital and continues to be listed on the NYSE as MHH.

In addition to currently being part of Mastech Digital's board of directors, Sunil also serves as the Managing Partner of SWAT Capital.

== Recognition ==
In 2023, Time Magazine recognized Wadhwani, along with his brother Romesh, as one of the 100 Most Influential People in Artificial Intelligence.

He received the Lifetime Achievement Award from the Pittsburgh Venture Capital Association at the 23rd PVCA Annual Luncheon in May 2017.

In 1991, Wadhwani was honored as a Distinguished Alumnus of the Indian Institute of Technology, Madras.

Sunil has written articles for publications including Datamation, Systems Integrator, and Reader's Digest. He has been quoted in publications such as Business Week, The Wall Street Journal, Information Week, and Investors Business Daily.

== Investments ==
Wadhwani is an angel investor. He has invested in over 30 early-stage technology companies, and has been on the board in several.

== Personal life ==
He is married to Nita. They have a son, Rohan, and a daughter, Shalina.
