= Active Network, LLC =

American multinational software company

Coordinates: 32.785676°N 96.798054°W

- Type: Subsidiary
- Industry: Software as a service
- Founded: San Diego, CA (1999)
- Headquarters: Dallas, TX, KPMG Centre, 717 North Harwood Street, Suite 2500, Dallas, Texas, U.S.
- Area served: Worldwide
- Key people: Andrea Facini (President)
- Products: Active.com; IPICO Sports; Activity Cloud; ActiveWorks Camps & Class Manager; ActiveWorks Endurance; ActiveWorks Outdoors; ActiveNet; Thriva; LeagueOne; MaxGalaxy; TeamPages; JumpForward; RegCenter; Virtual Event Bags
- Number of employees: 1,000–5,000
- Parent: Global Payments Inc.
- Website: www.activenetwork.com

Active Network, LLC, is an American multinational corporation headquartered in Dallas, Texas, that provides software as a service for activity and participant management. ACTIVE's management software supports a range of clients including: races, nonprofits, outdoor activities, camps, sports, schools, and universities. On October 18, 2022, the Consumer Financial Protection Bureau (CFPB) sued the online event registration company ACTIVE Network for tricking people trying to sign up for fundraising road races and other events, into enrolling into its annual subscription discount club, Active Advantage. The CFPB’s lawsuit describes how ACTIVE automatically and unlawfully enrolled families into its discount club by using digital duplicity. Consumers, many of whom just thought they were registering for a community race or event, ended up being enrolled into a costly membership club. The CFPB is suing to require ACTIVE to change this unlawful enrollment practice, reimburse consumers, and pay a penalty.

== History ==
ACTIVE was founded in 1998 by Jim Woodman under the name of Active USA as an information source for recreational athletes looking for regional sports information. In December 1999, ActiveUSA and Racegate merged in a deal that brought TicketMaster City Search as a major investor and the combined entity became headquartered in La Jolla, Calif. ACTIVE underwent a round of mergers and acquisitions in 1999 and 2000 with companies including: LeagueLink, Inc, Eteamz and Sierra Digital (RecWare).

On May 25, 2011, ACTIVE went public at $15 per share under the ticker symbol “ACTV” and completed its initial public offering two days later. On September 30, 2013, ACTIVE announced it was to be acquired by Vista Equity Partners for $1.05 billion, completing the sale on November 15 of the same year, at which time the company's president, Darko Dejanovic, was named CEO. Following its acquisition, ACTIVE moved its corporate headquarters from San Diego to Dallas.

In March 2015, ACTIVE launched ACTIVEkids.com, a site focused on kid specific events and activities. Following the launch of ACTIVEkids.com, ACTIVE announced a new data insights platform, Activity Cloud, to provide business intelligence to event organizers in May 2015.

In September 2017, Global Payments Inc. completed the acquisition of ACTIVE's communities and sports divisions.

== Products ==
=== Current ===
- ACTIVE.com – Online race and activity registration portal
- ACTIVEkids.com – Online kids events and activity registration portal
- IPICO Sports – Race timing chip systems (Purchased February 2015)
- Activity Cloud – Data insights for event organizers (Launched May 2015)
- ActiveWorks Endurance – Online race management and marketing
- ActiveWorks Camps & Class Manager – Online camp management software
- ActiveWorks Hy-Tek – Online swim team and meet management software
- ActiveNet – Facility and program management software
- LeagueOne – League management software
- TeamPages – Sports websites for teams and leagues
- JumpForward – Collegiate athlete recruiting management (Purchased May 2016)
- Maximum Solutions – Recreation management (Purchased January 2017)
- Thriva – Online registration software and marketing
- RegCenter – Online registration management

=== Former ===
- ActiveWorks Outdoors – Online campground, hunting and fishing, marina, venue, lodging and golf management (Vista Equity retained ownership during the Global Payments Inc. acquisition of ACTIVE)
- FellowshipOne – Church management software (Sold to Ministry Brands in March 2016)
- ServiceU – Event, giving and ticketing management (Sold to Ministry Brands in March 2016)
- ActiveGolf – Software for online tee time booking and golf operations. (Sold to GolfNow in October 2014)

== Acquisitions ==
=== ReserveAmerica ===
ACTIVE purchased ReserveAmerica from IAC in 2009 to extend their offerings to campground booking services. ACTIVE traded 3.5 million shares of convertible preferred stock in ACTIVE as part of the deal, giving IAC a nine percent holding in the company. ReserveAmerica provides reservations for campgrounds at state and national parks as well as reservation services for the Army Corps of Engineers, federal campgrounds and privately operated campgrounds.

=== StarCite ===
In 2012, ACTIVE purchased StarCite, a strategic meetings management technology, and created the Business Solutions group. In February 2014, the division was spun off and merged with Lanyon, a hospitality travel company, into Lanyon.

=== IPICO Sports ===
Philip Lockwood founded Mercury Sports Group (MSG) in 2003 with the goal to revolutionize race timing. At the same time, IPICO Inc. was working on their RFID technology in South Africa while looking for ways to expand into the global market. After working together to build technology for sports applications, MSG was acquired by IPICO Inc. to form IPICO Sports in 2008 following the shipment of the first Elite Reader kit in March 2007. In 2009, IPICO won Frost & Sullivan's North American RFID Sports Technology Leadership of the Year Award. In 2015, IPICO Sports was acquired by event management and registration company ACTIVE Network, LLC.

IPICO race timing chips have been used to track a variety of sporting events, including the Main Cross Country Festival of Champions. Additionally, the BolderBOULDER worked with IPICO Sports and End Result starting in 2007, tracking times for over 53,000 participants in the 2009 race. IPICO also teamed up with End Result on the 2008 Ironman World Championship, among other races.

In addition to running races and triathlons, other events utilize IPICO's sport timing. One example is the American Birkebeiner cross country skiing event.

ACTIVE acquired IPICO Sports in February 2015.

=== JumpForward ===
In May 2016, ACTIVE acquired JumpForward, a provider for NCAA recruiting, compliance, and business office management.

=== Maximum Solutions ===
In January 2017, ACTIVE acquired recreation management software provider Maximum Solutions.

== Hacking incident ==
In August 2016, a computer breach of Active Network's system that processes online hunting and fishing license sales was announced. Several million records containing personal information of persons with Oregon, Idaho and Washington state licenses were exposed.

== Controversies ==
Active Network was charged by the Alameda County District Attorney in 2016 for violating California consumer protection laws. The complaint alleges Active Network enrolled consumers into a free trial of their product Active Advantage without disclosing sufficient information that it would become a paid subscription without cancellation. The matter was settled with Active Network agreeing to pay $2.7 million in civil penalties and setting aside $1 million in restitution payments for the approximately 100,000 California consumers who were enrolled between 2010 and 2013.
