= Exercise and music =

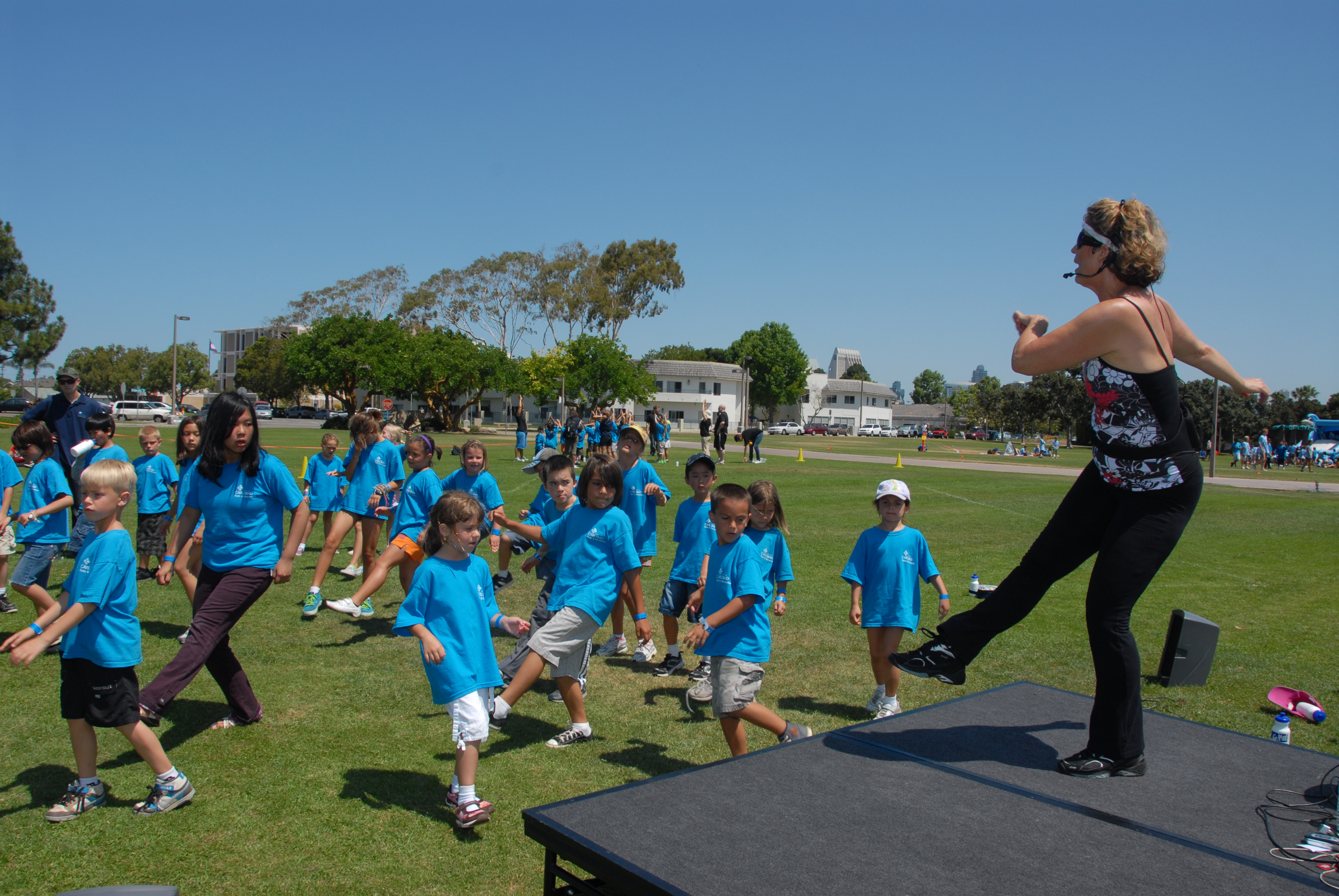
Children participating in a Jazzercise session

The interplay of exercise and music has long been discussed, crossing the disciplines of biomechanics, neurology, physiology, and sport psychology. Research and experimentation on the relation between music and exercise dates back to the early 1900s, when investigator Leonard Ayres found that cyclists pedaled faster in the presence of a band and music, as opposed to when it was silent. Since then, hundreds of studies have been conducted on both the physiological and psychological relationship between music and physical activity, with a number of clear cut relationships and trends emerging. Exercise and music involves the use of music before, during, and/or after performing a physical activity. Listening to music while exercising is done to improve aspects of exercise, such as strength output, exercise duration, and motivation. The use of music during exercise can provide physiological benefits as well as psychological benefits. In research and experiments, the physical and psychological effects of music and exercise tend to be measured by performance indicators such as heart rate, rate of perceived exertion, fatigue perception, self-reported mood changes, as well as performance indicators connected to the activity.

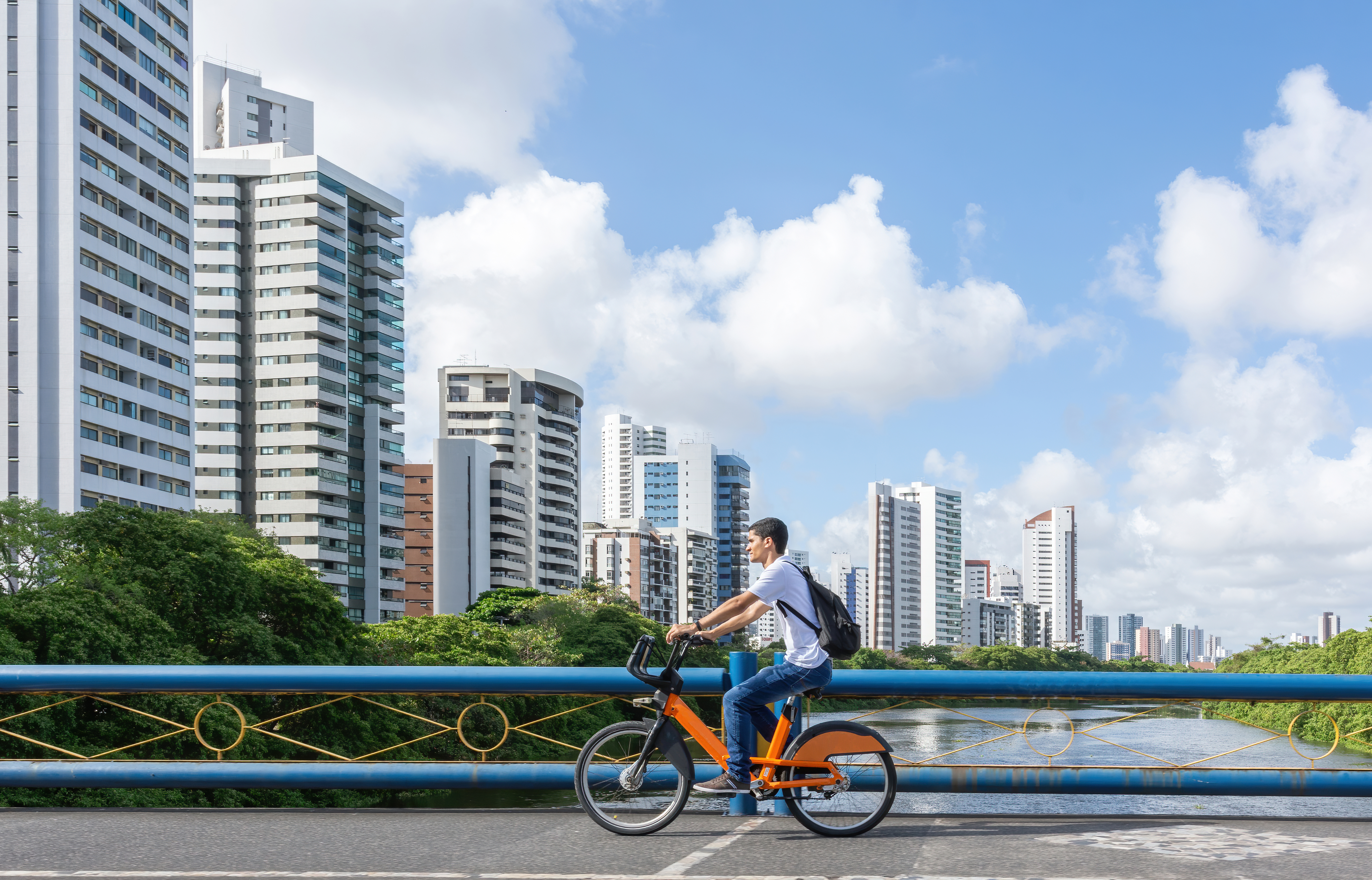
Man riding a bicycle while listening to music.

A meta analysis of over 139 studies regarding music and exercise was performed in 2020 and found music coupled with physical exercise leads to enhanced physical performance, reduced perceived exertion, and improved physiological efficiency.

== Major empirical findings ==
=== Physiological effects ===
Music is believed to induce a "groove" sensation in people. This groove sensation is thought to act as a motivator by improving the overall perception of the exercise itself. People tend to "automatically feel the beat" of the music they listen to and their body responds. These responses may present in the form of adjusted walking pace and differences in heart rate. Music improves exercise performance best under specific conditions. Research has shown that synchronous, self-selected music has the greatest positive effect on exercise performance. When compared with asynchronous and metronome music, it was found that listening to synchronous music, in particular, can promote rhythmic activity by encouraging the body to focus on coordinating movement to rhythmic cues and matching the tempo of the music.

A study from the Max Planck Institute for Human Cognition and Brain Sciences shows how music helps boost workouts. An experiment was done comparing the results of a control group working out in a normal workout setting to the results from the same group of people working out with modified machines that incorporated beats and rhythms into each rep. To do this, the researchers constructed and installed electronic kits into three different workout machines; one a stair-stepper, the other two weight machines with bars that could be raised or pulled down to stimulate various muscles. These kits allowed the workout machines to generate a variety of sounds and rhythms based on how the user manipulated them. Thomas Hans Fritz, a researcher who led the study said, “participants could express themselves on the machines by, for instance, modulating rhythms and creating melodies.” Throughout each workout, the researchers monitored the force their volunteers generated while using the machines, as well as whether the weight lifters’ movements tended to stutter or flow and how much oxygen the volunteers consumed. Afterward, the scientists asked the volunteers to rate the tolerability or unpleasantness of the session, on a scale from 1 to 20. The results of this study found that participants on the music-equipped machines generated greater muscle force, used less oxygen, and reported less strenuous exertions.

In a separate study involving a group of young (aged 19 to 25), untrained participants, music was found to cause an increase in exercise duration due to fast and loud music when compared to other subjects that did not listen to music at all.

So far, studies surrounding the effect of music on bench-press output have found that max strength is unaffected by the use of music during exercise.

==== The effects of tempo on performance ====
In a study published in 2009, researchers at the Research Institute for Sport and Exercise Sciences at Liverpool John Moores University had 12 subjects ride a stationary bicycle at a pace that they could sustain for 30 minutes while listening to a song of the subject's choice. In successive trials, they rode the bikes again, with the tempo of the music variously increased or decreased by 10%, without the subject's knowledge. The researchers results showed that the riders heart rate and mileage decreased when the tempo was slowed, whereas at the faster tempo, they rode a greater distance, increased their heart rate and enjoyed the music more. Though the participants thought their workout was harder at the more upbeat tempo, the researchers found that when the faster-paced music was heard while exercising "the participants chose to accept, and even prefer, a greater degree of effort".

Scientists at the University of Wisconsin–La Crosse found in a 2003 study that participants who chose to listen to faster-paced music generated a higher heart rate, pedaled harder and generated more power, increasing their level of work by as much as 15% by diverting their focus to the music. The study tested 20 volunteers who listened to an MP3 player loaded with a mix of 13 songs that they selected and then rode an exercise bike for an hour at a pace and gear of their choice. The study found that heart rates rose from 133 to 146 beats per minute and power output increased accordingly, when listening to the tempo-less sound of crashing waves versus music with a medium to fast tempo.

In addition, research suggests loud music can lead to more effective exercise when compared to slow, lower tempo music. Loud, high tempo music positively correlates with increased running rate and heart rate. Higher tempo music, specifically music greater than 120 BPM, leads to what is called an ergogenic effect on physical performance; an ergogenic effect is any substance or mechanical device that leads to greater physical performance. Specifically, handgrip, velocity, power, and muscle endurance all increase when listening to music before or during exercise. It has also been found that the music preference of the individual has a significant effect on the level of ergogenic effect. Essentially, a person is more likely to perform better during physical activity when they are listening to music they enjoy. Motivational music has been found to have a significantly greater effect on women during aerobic and anerobic exercise. Women exhibited an overall more positive effect on physical performance compared to men when listening to all types of music, while men mainly benefited from listening to synchronous music.

A 2004 study by a research team from Australia, Israel and the United States found that in runners performing at a pace where they were at 90% of their peak oxygen uptake, music had no effect on their heart rate or running pace, regardless of the music's tempo.

=== Psychological effects ===
Listening to music while exercising has been found in multiple studies to create an increased sense of motivation, distracting the mind while increasing heart rate. Researchers found that music with a faster tempo tends to motivate exercisers to work harder when performing at a moderate pace, but peak performance has been found to be unaffected by listening to music. The increased sense of motivation may also be due in part to the music itself triggering the body's reward systems.

It is possible that some productive benefits from listening to music while exercising may come from the distraction it provides to the listener. The external cues from the music may act as a "dissociative stimulus," forcing the body to not only respond to the physiological cues from the physical exertion, but also requiring the body to receive and respond to the music stimulus. The body is limited as far as how many stimuli it can perceive at once. Therefore, having music serve as a distracting stimulus may decrease the amount of fatigue the body can and will perceive.

Some studies also suggest music can serve as a distractor to the pain or discomfort one experiences when performing difficult exercises. Psychologists believe that when working out and listening to music, the pain and music are competing stimuli. So, listening to music may help a person ignore fatigue, complete more repetitions of a specific exercise, or just enjoy their workout more.

Generally, studies suggest that athletes use music in purposeful ways to facilitate training and performance. In one study, seventy elite Swedish athletes completed a questionnaire relating to the empirical motives for listening to music. The results showed that most of them often listened to music during pre-event, pre-training sessions, and warm-ups. The athletes gave as reasons for listening to music that they felt that it increased activation, positive affect, motivation, performance levels, and flow.

Separately, both exercise and music as individual factors have been proven to increase mood, decrease depression and depression like symptoms, and overall lead to better mental health. Numerous studies have shown listening to preferable music improves mood and behavior, as well as stimulates blood flow to various regions of the brain. Working out is very similar, as it releases a variety of hormones that stimulate growth, memory formation, and it has been shown to increase cognition and longevity.

== See also ==
- jog.fm — a website that suggests the music for exercise
- Music and aerobic exercise performance
