= Mastech Digital =

Information technology staffing and digital transformation company

Mastech
- Type: Public
- Traded as: NYSE: MHH; Russell Microcap Index component
- Industry: Technology services
- Founded: 1986; 40 years ago
- Founder: Ashok Trivedi, Sunil Wadhwani
- Headquarters: Pittsburgh, U.S.
- Number of locations: 11
- Area served: United States, Canada, Europe, and India
- Key people: Nirav Patel (president & CEO); John Cronin (CFO)
- Services: Data Management & Analytics, and IT Staffing
- Revenue: ▼US$198.9 million (2024)
- Net income: ▲US$3.4 million (2024)
- Number of employees: 1,564
- Website: mastech.com

Mastech Digital, Inc. is an American-based digital transformation and information technology (IT) services company headquartered in Pittsburgh, Pennsylvania, and provides services to corporations across North America, the Middle East, Asia, and Japan.

== History ==
Mastech Digital, Inc. was founded in Pittsburgh, PA in 1986, and was originally known as Mastech Holdings, Inc. The company became listed on Nasdaq in 1996.

In 2000, the company’s name was changed to iGate Capital Corporation, and split into nine separate business units. Mastech Holdings, Inc., one of the units, spun off as a separately-listed company in 2008, with revenue close to US$100 million.

In May 2015, Mastech Holdings, Inc. announced its plan to acquire the US IT staffing business of Hudson Global Inc. The deal was finalized in June of the same year, and valued at US$17 million.

Mastech Holdings, Inc. changed its name to Mastech Digital, Inc. in September 2016.

On July 7, 2017 Mastech entered into an agreement to acquire InfoTrellis, Inc., a Canada-based information management consulting and technology services company that provides project and consulting services in master data management, data integration, and big data. The deal was finalized on July 13 and valued at USD $55 million. The acquired entity was renamed as Mastech InfoTrellis, as a business unit under Mastech Digital.

On June 2, 2020, Mastech launched its remote staffing service offering, called MAS-REMOTE. Through this service, Mastech helps its customers hire top 10% US based IT remote consultants, backed by a comprehensive screening and on-boarding process.

On October 1, 2020, Mastech entered into an agreement to acquire AmberLeaf Partners, Inc., a Chicago-based customer experience consulting company. The acquired entity is affiliated with Mastech InfoTrellis valued at US$14 million. The combined businesses will provide customers with an expanded suite of service offerings, delivery capabilities, and human capital across North America, EMEA, India and ASEAN countries.

== Locations ==
Mastech Digital has offices in Pittsburgh, PA, Boston, MA, Tampa, FL, Lake Mary, FL, Dallas, TX, CA, Chicago, IL, Toronto, UK, Canada, Noida, India, and Chennai, India.

== Recognition ==
On November 30, 2020, Mastech Digital was recognized by TechServe's Excellence in the New Normal Honors.
