= IGATE =

IT services company

IGATE Corporation
- Company type: Public
- Traded as: Nasdaq: IGTE
- Industry: IT services, BPO
- Founded: 1996; 30 years ago
- Founder: Ashok Trivedi; Sunil Wadhwani
- Defunct: 2015
- Fate: Acquired by Capgemini
- Headquarters: Bridgewater, New Jersey, U.S.
- Area served: North America, Europe, Japan & Australia
- Key people: Srinivas Kandula (CEO)
- Services: IT and Outsourcing services
- Owner: Capgemini
- Website: http://www.igate.com/

IGATE Corporation was an IT services company, headquartered in Bridgewater, New Jersey, United States. The firm operated in North America, Asia, Europe, Japan and Australia, providing technology consultancy and services. Its revenues in 2014 were over US$1.2 billion, and it has a workforce of over 31,000. The firm had over 70 offices and customer delivery centers in North America, Europe, Asia and Australia. On 27 April 2015 French IT services group Capgemini unveiled a deal to acquire IGATE for $4 billion.

== History ==
Under the Companies Act of 1956, IGATE was originally incorporated as Mascot Systems Private Limited, in 1993, and later renamed Mascot Systems Limited. It was formerly a subsidiary of Mastech Systems Corporation, now Mastech Digital.

In 2011, IGATE acquired Patni Computer Systems, which was three times its size at the time. With a value of around a billion US dollars, this acquisition was the largest cross-border leveraged transaction in the IT sector, and was accomplished over 12 months, including the de-listing of Patni from the Indian bourses and consolidating the shareholder value in the U.S. Initially. IGATE changed its name to IGATE Patni. It was changed to IGATE again on 7 May 2012. Its shares are listed on the NYSE as "IGATE". On 27 April 2015, Capgemini announced it would be acquiring IGATE, the transition would be completed over a phase of six months. IGATE CEO Ashok Vemuri announced his departure on 6 October 2015.

In January 2016 Capgemini announced that IGATE would operate exclusively under the Capgemini brand, six months after completion of its acquisition of the US-based corporation.

== Settlements and Lawsuits ==
In 2008, the Civil Rights Division of the Department of Justice settled a case with iGate Mastech, Inc. following claims by the Programmers Guild that the company discriminated against workers based on their citizenship status. The Programmers Guild alleged that iGate Mastech, Inc. engaged in discriminatory hiring practices. Specifically, the company was accused of tailoring its recruitment process to favor non-immigrant foreign workers, thereby excluding or discouraging qualified domestic applicants. To resolve the dispute and comply with the Immigration and Nationality Act (INA), iGate agreed to stop publishing job ads that favored foreign workers over domestic applicants and paid a $45,000 fine.

== Key services ==
IGATE's key services included:

- Application development
- Application maintenance
- Business intelligence and Analytics
- Business process outsourcing
- Cloud services
- Enterprise mobility
- Infrastructure management services
- P&ES embedded systems
- Verification and validation (V&V)

== Locations ==
IGATE customer delivery centers were located in Pensacola, Florida; El Paso, Texas; Sterling, Virginia, United States; Guadalajara, Mexico; Mississauga, Ontario, Canada; Stockholm, Sweden; London, UK; Ballarat, Australia; Suzhou, China; and Mumbai, Bangalore, Pune, Chennai, Trichy, Hyderabad, Noida and Gandhinagar in India.

Its training and development facility, IGATE Corporate University, was in Pune, situated on 50 acres (200,000 m^{2}) of land in the Navi Mumbai area, this campus included facilities for software development, training, customer care, and employee recreation. The IGATE (Patni) Knowledge Park accommodates 17,000 professionals.

== Recognition ==
- Ranked 51st in the 2014 Fortune "100 Fastest Growing Companies" list
- VCCircle Award 2014
