= List of United States Senate elections in Pennsylvania =

United States Senate elections in Pennsylvania occur when voters in the U.S. Commonwealth of Pennsylvania select an individual to represent the state in the United States Senate in either of the state's two seats allotted by the U.S. Constitution. Regularly scheduled general elections occur on Election Day, coinciding with various other federal, statewide, and local races.

Per the original text of the U.S. Constitution, each state was allotted two U.S. senators selected by the state legislature for staggered six-year terms. After the election of the founding members of the U.S. Senate in 1788, the Senate was divided into three groups, or "classes" (Class 1, Class 2, and Class 3) to stagger the six-year terms of its members. Per Article I, Section 3, Clause 2 of the Constitution, the founding members of Class 1 would serve two years, Class 2 four years, and Class 3 six years. All senators elected thereafter would serve full six-year terms such that one-third of the Senate would be up for re-election every two years. Pennsylvania was assigned a Class 1 seat and a Class 3 seat. Since the passage of the 17th Amendment to the Constitution in 1913, U.S. senators are elected directly to six-year terms by the voters of each state at the general election held on Election Day. Special elections may be held to fill mid-term vacancies by electing an individual to serve the remainder of the unexpired term. The next Class 1 U.S. Senate election in Pennsylvania is scheduled for November 5, 2030, and the next Class 3 election in Pennsylvania is scheduled for November 7, 2028.

The list below contains election returns from all twenty Class 1 and twenty-one Class 3 post-17th Amendment U.S. Senate elections in Pennsylvania, including special elections, sorted by year and beginning with the first in 1914 and the most recent in 2024. Incumbent senators are listed as well as elected senators and runner(s)-up in each election, including major third-party candidates (garnering 5% or more of the popular vote). Parties are color-coded to the left of a Senator's or candidate's name according to the key below. The popular vote and percentage margins listed in the "Margin" column are the differences between the total votes received and percentage of the popular vote received by the top two finishers in the corresponding election (i.e. the margin-of-victory of an elected Senator over the nearest competitor).

== List of recent elections ==
Parties (Note: As listed on the ballot and in election returns.)

Independent Democratic Republican Prohibition Progressive Party (1924) Progressive Party (1912)

=== Class 1 ===
County-level results of previous two Class 1 Senate elections

2018 election, between Bob Casey, Jr. (blue) and Lou Barletta (red)

2024 election, between Dave McCormick (red) and Bob Casey, Jr. (blue)

Election*	Incumbent Senator	Elected Senator	Votes	Runner(s)-up	Votes	Margin	Notes
1916	George T. Oliver	Philander C. Knox	680,451 (56.36%)	Ellis L. Orvis	450,106 (37.28%)	230,345 (19.08%)	
1922*	David A. Reed	David A. Reed	860,483 (86.15%)	Others	138,377 (13.85%)	—	(Note: In 1922, a special election and a regularly scheduled general election were held simultaneously for the Class 1 seat. David Reed had been appointed in August 1922 to fill the vacancy created by the death of William E. Crow (who had been appointed to fill a vacancy created by the death of Philander C. Knox) until the election of a successor. Reed was subsequently elected both to complete the term ending on March 4, 1923 (upper row), and to a full six-year term beginning on March 4, 1923 (lower row).)
1922*	David A. Reed	David A. Reed	802,146 (56.04%)	Samuel E. Shull	423,583 (29.59%)	378,563 (26.45%)	
1922*	David A. Reed	David A. Reed	802,146 (56.04%)	William J. Burke	127,180 (8.88%)	378,563 (26.45%)	
1928	David A. Reed	David A. Reed	1,948,646 (64.38%)	William N. McNair	1,029,055 (34.00%)	919,591 (30.38%)	
1934	David A. Reed	Joseph F. Guffey	1,494,001 (50.78%)	David A. Reed	1,366,877 (46.46%)	127,124 (4.32%)	
1940	Joseph F. Guffey	Joseph F. Guffey	2,069,980 (51.79%)	Jay Cooke	1,893,104 (47.36%)	176,876 (4.43%)	
1946	Joseph F. Guffey	Edward Martin	1,853,458 (59.26%)	Joseph F. Guffey	1,245,338 (39.81%)	608,120 (19.45%)	
1952	Edward Martin	Edward Martin	2,331,034 (51.57%)	Guy K. Bard	2,168,546 (47.98%)	162,488 (3.59%)	
1958	Edward Martin	Hugh Scott	2,042,586 (51.21%)	George M. Leader	1,929,821 (48.38%)	112,765 (2.83%)	
1964	Hugh Scott	Hugh Scott	2,429,858 (50.64%)	Genevieve Blatt	2,353,223 (49.05%)	76,635 (1.59%)	
1970	Hugh Scott	Hugh Scott	1,874,106 (51.43%)	William Sesler	1,653,774 (45.38%)	220,332 (6.05%)	
1976	Hugh Scott	John Heinz	2,381,891 (52.39%)	William Green	2,126,977 (46.78%)	254,914 (5.61%)	
1982	John Heinz	John Heinz	2,136,418 (59.28%)	Cyril Wecht	1,412,965 (39.20%)	723,453 (20.08%)	
1988	John Heinz	John Heinz	2,901,715 (66.45%)	Joe Vignola	1,416,764 (32.45%)	1,484,951 (34.00%)	
1991*	Harris Wofford	Harris Wofford	1,860,760 (55.01%)	Dick Thornburgh	1,521,986 (44.99%)	338,774 (10.02%)	(Note: John Heinz died in a mid-air collision between two aircraft, one of which he was aboard, in April 1991. Democrat Harris Wofford was appointed by Governor Robert P. Casey in May 1991 to fill the vacancy. He was subsequently elected to serve the remainder of Heinz's term in the special election of November 1991.)
1994	Harris Wofford	Rick Santorum	1,735,691 (49.40%)	Harris Wofford	1,648,481 (46.92%)	87,210 (2.48%)	
2000	Rick Santorum	Rick Santorum	2,481,962 (52.42%)	Ron Klink	2,154,908 (45.51%)	327,054 (6.91%)	
2006	Rick Santorum	Bob Casey, Jr.	2,392,984 (58.68%)	Rick Santorum	1,684,778 (41.32%)	708,206 (17.36%)	
2012	Bob Casey, Jr.	Bob Casey, Jr.	3,021,364 (53.69%)	Tom Smith	2,509,132 (44.59%)	512,232 (9.10%)	
2018	Bob Casey, Jr.	Bob Casey, Jr.	2,792,437 (55.74%)	Lou Barletta	2,134,848 (42.62%)	657,589 (13.12%)	
2024	Bob Casey, Jr.	Dave McCormick	3,399,295 (48.82%)	Bob Casey, Jr.	3,384,180 (48.60%)	15,115 (0.22%)	

Note: Asterisk (*) next to year denotes a special election.

=== Class 3 ===
County-level results of previous two Class 3 Senate elections

2016 election, between Pat Toomey (red) and Katie McGinty (blue)

2022 election, between John Fetterman (blue) and Mehmet Oz (red)

Election*	Incumbent Senator	Elected Senator	Votes	Runner(s)-up	Votes	Margin	Notes
1914	Boies Penrose	Boies Penrose	519,801 (46.75%)	Gifford Pinchot	269,235 (24.22%)	250,566 (22.53%)	
1914	Boies Penrose	Boies Penrose	519,801 (46.75%)	A. Mitchell Palmer	266,415 (23.96%)	250,566 (22.53%)	
1920	Boies Penrose	Boies Penrose	1,069,785 (59.98%)	John A. Farrell	484,352 (24.22%)	585,433 (35.76%)	
1920	Boies Penrose	Boies Penrose	1,069,785 (59.98%)	Leah C. Marion	132,610 (7.44%)	585,433 (35.76%)	
1922*	George W. Pepper	George W. Pepper	819,507 (57.60%)	Fred Kerr	468,330 (32.92%)	351,177 (24.68%)	(Note: In 1922, in addition to a special/general election for the Class 1 seat, a special election for the Class 3 seat was held. George W. Pepper was appointed by Governor William Sproul to fill the vacancy following the death of Boies Penrose in December 1921. Pepper was subsequently elected in 1922 to serve the remainder of Penrose's term.)
1926	George W. Pepper	William S. Vare	822,178 (54.64%)	William B. Wilson	648,680 (43.11%)	173,498 (11.53%)	
1930*	Joseph R. Grundy	James J. Davis	1,462,186 (71.54%)	Sedgwick Kistler	523,338 (25.61%)	938,848 (45.93%)	(Note: Although William S. Vare won the 1926 election, his victory was controversial and overshadowed by scandal. As a result, Governor Gifford Pinchot refused to certify the results and Vare (having never been sworn-in) was formally unseated by the U.S. Senate in December 1929. Joseph R. Grundy was appointed later that month by Governor John S. Fisher to fill the vacancy until the next election.)
1932	James J. Davis	James J. Davis	1,368,707 (49.35%)	Lawrence H. Rupp	1,200,322 (43.28%)	168,385 (6.07%)	
1938	James J. Davis	James J. Davis	2,086,932 (54.72%)	George H. Earle	1,694,464 (43.11%)	392,468 (11.61%)	
1944	James J. Davis	Francis J. Myers	1,864,735 (49.99%)	James J. Davis	1,840,943 (49.35%)	23,792 (0.64%)	
1950	Francis J. Myers	James H. Duff	1,820,400 (51.30%)	Francis J. Myers	1,694,076 (47.74%)	126,324 (3.56%)	
1956	James H. Duff	Joseph S. Clark, Jr.	2,268,641 (50.08%)	James H. Duff	2,250,671 (49.69%)	17,970 (0.39%)	
1962	Joseph S. Clark, Jr.	Joseph S. Clark, Jr.	2,238,383 (51.06%)	James E. Van Zandt	2,134,649 (48.70%)	103,734 (2.36%)	
1968	Joseph S. Clark, Jr.	Richard Schweiker	2,399,762 (51.90%)	Joseph S. Clark, Jr.	2,117,662 (45.80%)	282,100 (6.10%)	
1974	Richard Schweiker	Richard Schweiker	1,843,317 (53.00%)	Peter F. Flaherty	1,596,121 (45.89%)	247,196 (7.11%)	
1980	Richard Schweiker	Arlen Specter	2,230,404 (50.48%)	Peter F. Flaherty	2,122,391 (48.04%)	108,013 (2.44%)	
1986	Arlen Specter	Arlen Specter	1,906,537 (56.44%)	Robert W. Edgar	1,448,219 (42.87%)	458,318 (13.57%)	
1992	Arlen Specter	Arlen Specter	2,358,125 (49.10%)	Lynn Yeakel	2,224,966 (46.33%)	133,159 (2.77%)	
1998	Arlen Specter	Arlen Specter	1,814,180 (61.34%)	William R. Lloyd, Jr.	1,028,839 (34.79%)	785,341 (26.55%)	
2004	Arlen Specter	Arlen Specter	2,925,080 (52.62%)	Joe Hoeffel	2,334,126 (41.99%)	590,954 (10.63%)	
2010	Arlen Specter	Pat Toomey	2,028,945 (51.01%)	Joe Sestak	1,948,716 (48.99%)	80,229 (2.02%)	(Note: Specter changed party registration from Republican to Democratic in April 2009. He subsequently lost the primary election to Sestak.)
2016	Pat Toomey	Pat Toomey	2,951,702 (48.77%)	Kathleen McGinty	2,865,012 (47.34%)	86,690 (1.43%)	
2022	Pat Toomey	John Fetterman	2,751,012 (51.03%)	Mehmet Oz	2,487,260 (46.03%)	208,334 (4.04%)	

Note: Asterisk (*) next to year denotes a special election.

== Graphs of results ==
=== Class 1 results from 1916 to 2024 ===
- Republican
- Major Third Party (>5%)
- Other
- Democratic

=== Class 3 results from 1914 to 2022 ===
- Republican
- Major Third Party (>5%)
- Other
- Democratic

== See also ==
- List of United States senators from Pennsylvania
- List of Pennsylvania gubernatorial elections
- List of United States presidential elections in Pennsylvania
- Elections in Pennsylvania
- Government of Pennsylvania
