= 1916 United States Senate election in Pennsylvania =

- November 7, 1916
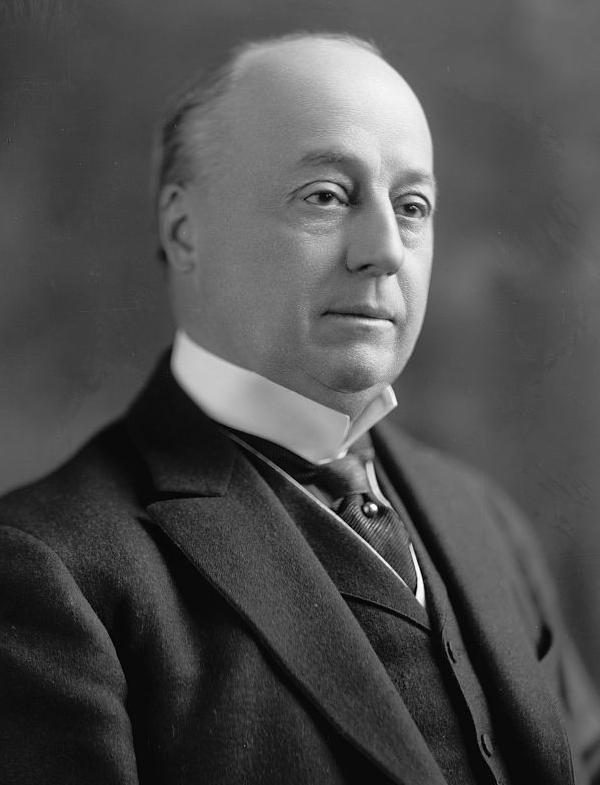

Nominee	Philander C. Knox	Ellis L. Orvis
Party	Republican	Democratic
Popular vote	680,451	450,112
Percentage	56.31%	37.25%
- County results Knox: 40–50% 50–60% 60–70% Orvis: 40–50% 50–60% 60–70%
U.S. senator before election
George T. Oliver
Republican
Elected U.S. Senator
Philander C. Knox
Republican

The 1916 United States Senate election in Pennsylvania was held on November 7, 1916. Incumbent Republican U.S. Senator George T. Oliver was not a candidate for re-election.

The Republican nominee, Philander C. Knox, defeated Democratic nominee Ellis C. Orvis.

== General election ==
=== Candidates ===
- Herbert T. Ames, Williamsport attorney (Prohibition)
- Charles W. Ervin (Socialist)
- Philander C. Knox, former U.S. Senator and United States Secretary of State (Republican)
- Robert Colvin Macauley Jr. (Single Tax)
- Ellis L. Orvis, Bellefonte attorney and retired Centre County judge (Democratic)
- William H. Thomas (Socialist Labor)

=== Results ===
General election results
Party	Candidate	Votes	%
Republican	Philander C. Knox	680,451	56.31%
Democratic	Ellis L. Orvis	450,112	37.25%
Socialist	Charles W. Ervin	45,385	3.76%
Prohibition	Herbert T. Ames	30,089	2.49%
Single Tax	Robert Colvin Macauley Jr.	1,387	0.12%
Socialist Labor	William H. Thomas	1,022	0.09%
Total votes		1,208,446	100.00%

== Aftermath ==
Knox subsequently died in October 1921, during his first term, and William E. Crow was appointed to fill the vacancy. Crow then also died before the expiration of the term, in August 1922.

David A. Reed was then appointed to fill the vacancy created by Crow's death, and was subsequently elected to complete the rest of the term expiring in March 1923 and to a full six-year term in his own right on the same day.
