= 1944 United States Senate election in Pennsylvania =

- November 7, 1944
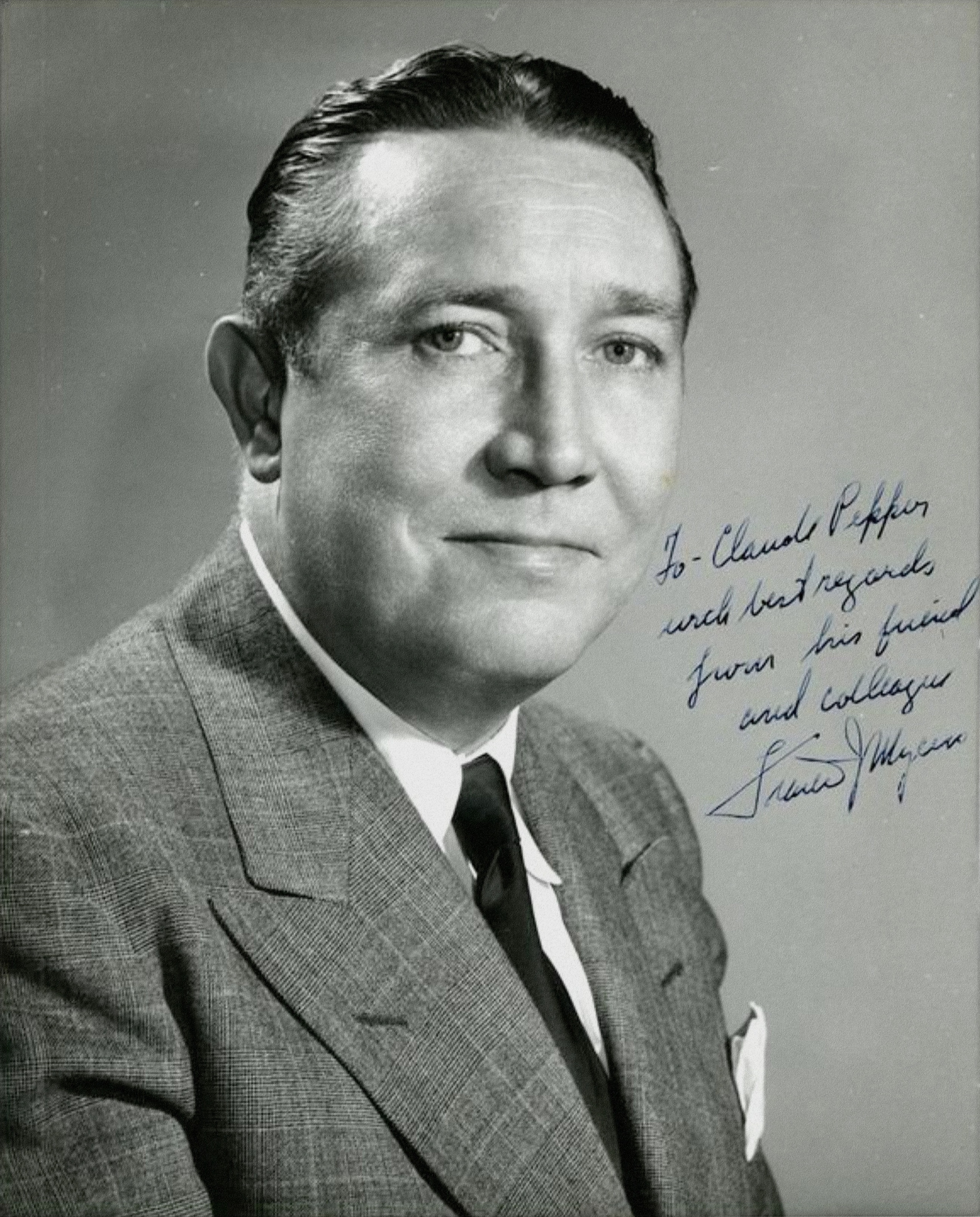

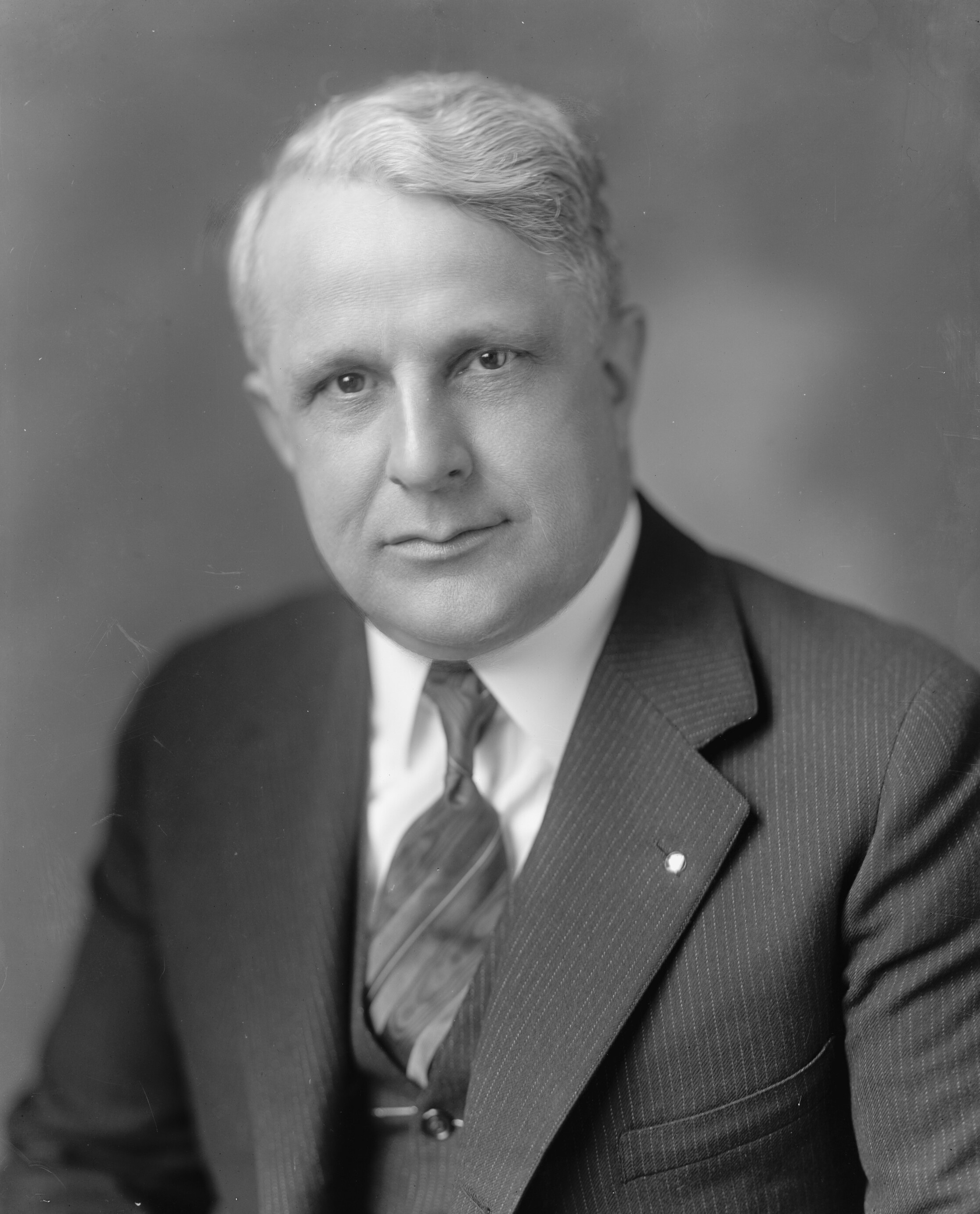
Nominee	Francis J. Myers	James J. Davis
Party	Democratic	Republican
Popular vote	1,864,622	1,840,938
Percentage	49.99%	49.35%
- County results Myers: 50–60% 60–70% Davis: 50–60% 60–70% 70–80%
U.S. senator before election
James J. Davis
Republican
Elected U.S. Senator
Francis J. Myers
Democratic

The 1944 United States Senate election in Pennsylvania was held on November 7, 1944. Incumbent Republican U.S. Senator James J. Davis sought re-election, but was defeated by Democratic nominee Francis J. Myers.

This is the first time since 1861 that Democrats held this Senate seat. Other than Arlen Specter's brief tenure as a Democrat during the 111th United States Congress after a party switch, the 1944 election marked the only time between 1856 and 2023 with the election of John Fetterman that Pennsylvania sent two members of the Democratic Party to the United States Senate. During the 79th United States Congress, Myers served alongside Democratic Senator Joseph F. Guffey, who would lose re-election in 1946.

== General election ==
=== Candidates ===
- James J. Davis, incumbent U.S. Senator (Republican)
- Frank Knotek (Socialist Labor)
- Francis J. Myers, U.S. Representative from Philadelphia (Democratic)
- Charles Palmer (Prohibition)
- J. Henry Stump, mayor of Reading (Socialist)

=== Results ===
General election results
Party	Candidate	Votes	%	±%
Democratic	Francis J. Myers	1,864,622	49.99%	▲5.58
Republican	James J. Davis (incumbent)	1,840,938	49.35%	▼5.35
Socialist	J. Henry Stump	14,129	0.38%	▼0.15
Prohibition	Charles Palmer	8,599	0.23%	▼0.01
Socialist Labor	Frank Knotek	1,989	0.05%	N/A
Total votes		3,730,277	100.00%	
