= 1922 United States Senate special election in Pennsylvania =

- November 7, 1922
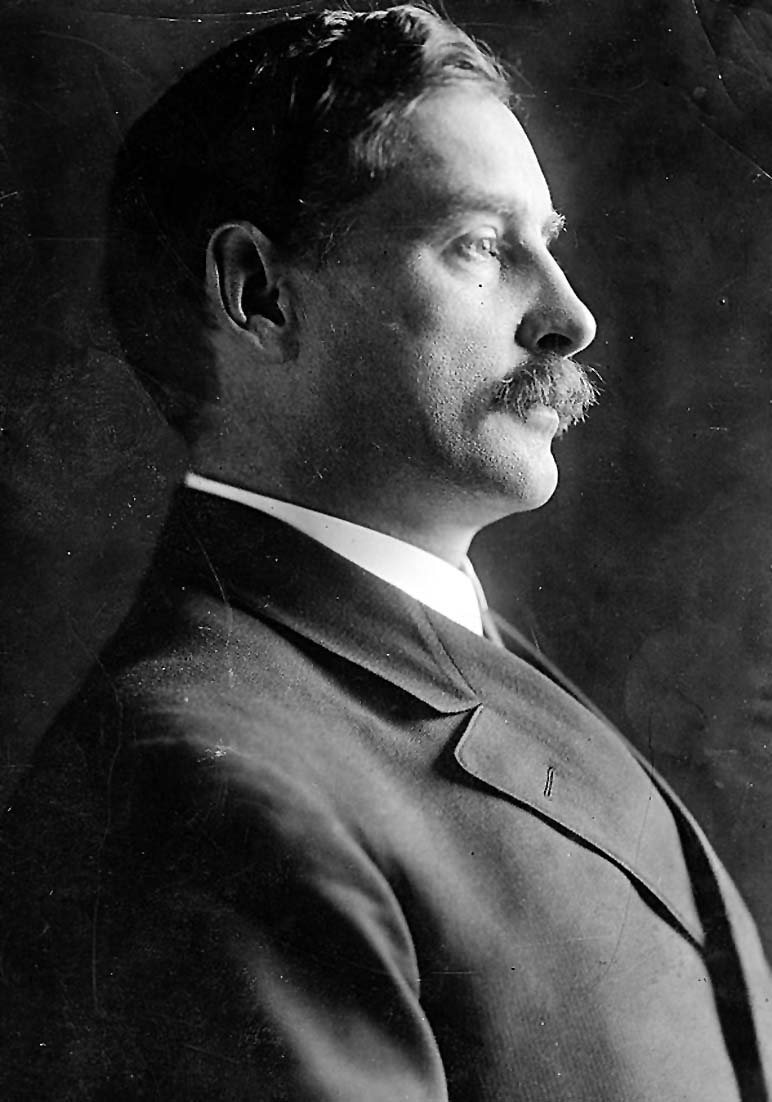

Nominee	George Pepper	Frederick B. Kerr
Party	Republican	Democratic
Popular vote	819,507	468,330
Percentage	57.60%	32.91%
- County results Pepper: 30–40% 40–50% 50–60% 60–70% 70–80% Kerr: 40–50% 50–60% 60–70%
U.S. senator before election
George Pepper
Republican
Elected U.S. Senator
George Pepper
Republican

The 1922 United States Senate special election in Pennsylvania was held on November 7, 1922. Republican senator George Pepper, who had been appointed to the seat by Governor William Sproul following the death of Boies Penrose, was elected to fill the remaining four years on the term to which Penrose had been elected in 1920. Pepper comfortably defeated five other candidates, including Democratic nominee Frederick B. Kerr of Clearfield County.

== Background ==
Incumbent Senator Boies Penrose, who had been elected in 1920 for a term expiring in 1927, died on December 31, 1921. Governor of Pennsylvania William Cameron Sproul appointed George W. Pepper to fill Penrose's seat until a successor could be duly elected. The special election for the remainder of Penrose's term was scheduled for November 7, simultaneous with the general election.

Primary elections were held on May 16. Pepper was a candidate to complete the term.

== Republican primary ==
=== Candidates ===
- William J. Burke, U.S. representative from Pittsburgh (representing Pennsylvania at-large)
- George W. Pepper, former University of Pennsylvania Law School professor and interim U.S. senator
- Edward R. Wood, retired Philadelphia businessman

=== Campaign ===
William J. Burke of Pittsburgh, who had previously been running in the regularly scheduled election for Pennsylvania's other Senate seat, entered this race after Penrose died.

=== Results ===
1922 U.S. Senate special Republican primary
Party	Candidate	Votes	%
Republican	George W. Pepper (incumbent)	577,534	58.65%
Republican	William J. Burke	336,375	34.16%
Republican	Edward R. Wood	70,727	7.18%
Write-in		47	0.00%
Total votes		984,636	100.00%

After losing the Republican primary, Burke campaigned as the Progressive nominee in the regularly scheduled election for Pennsylvania's other U.S. Senate seat.

== General election ==
=== Candidates ===
- Frederick B. Kerr, Clearfield businessman and U.S. Army veteran (Democratic)
- Frank Lewis (Prohibition)
- George Wharton Pepper, former University of Pennsylvania Law School professor and interim U.S. senator (Republican)
- James Robinson (Single Tax)
- Earl Thompson (Progressive)
- William Van Essen (Socialist)

=== Results ===
General election results
Party	Candidate	Votes	%	±%
Republican	George Pepper (incumbent)	819,507	57.60%	−2.34%
Democratic	Frederick B. Kerr	468,330	32.91%	+5.73%
Progressive	Earl Thompson	57,075	4.01%	N/A
Socialist	William Van Essen	38,440	2.70%	−1.08%
Prohibition	Frank Lewis	34,089	2.40%	−5.04%
Single Tax	James Robinson	5,356	0.38%	+0.26%
Write-in		59	0.00%	N/A
Total votes		1,422,856	100.00%	
Republican hold		Swing	{{{swing}}}	
