= Sedgwick Kistler =

Member of the Democratic National Committee from Pennsylvania
- In office May 20, 1928 – May 22, 1936
- Preceded by: Joe Guffey
- Succeeded by: George Earle

Personal details
- Born: September 10, 1875 Lock Haven, Pennsylvania, U.S.
- Died: April 28, 1952 (aged 76)
- Party: Democratic
- Spouse: Bertha Kaul
- Children: Gertrude

Sedgwick Kistler was a Democratic political figure from Lock Haven, Pennsylvania.

Kistler represented Pennsylvania as its Democratic National Committeeman from 1928 through 1936.

In 1930, he was the Democratic nominee for the United States Senate seat left vacant by the disqualification of William Vare, but lost to Labor Secretary James Davis in one of the most lopsided defeats in state history.

== Political career ==
Kistler first became interested in politics and international affairs after high school. He became involved in politics with the campaign of 1914 with A. Mitchell Palmer and Vance McCormick in rehabilitating the Democratic party. Kistler later became involved with the Pennsylvania Democratic National Committee, until he was elected as the Democratic National Committeeman in 1928. In 1930, Kistler was selected as the Democratic candidate for the United States Senate in that year's election. He lost in one of the most lopsided defeats in state history. Kistler was an anti-Prohibition “wet” candidate, and it is likely that it was this position that cost Kistler the election.

Kistler sided with the leaders of the Democratic National Committee, Chairman John Raskob and Executive Chairman Jouett Shouse in wanting to align the Democratic Party in support of big business. Kistler was a noted supporter of Al Smith since 1926, and remained something of a figurehead for Al Smith supporters in the party. As Franklin Delano Roosevelt rose in popularity within the Democratic Party, Kistler was reelected as national committeeman in order to assure Al Smith supporters. By 1936, Kistler stepped down from his position in the party as support for FDR increased.

Kistler was strongly anti-FDR, especially with his New Deal policies. Kistler was aligned with Al Smith on the New Deal, agreeing it was too radical and would not even bring about the change it was intended to create. Even after he was done working with the Democratic National Committee, Kistler continued to voice his opinion on FDR’s presidency, strongly protesting his third term bid as a move towards “dictatorship.”

Kistler was highly involved in his party, both locally and nationally. Kistler met with the local Young Democrats club of Lock Haven. From 1928 to 1932, Kistler personally financed the Democratic State headquarters in Philadelphia so that the party could keep offices open.

== Business career ==
Kistler carried on his family’s tannery business in Lock Haven, Pennsylvania, which was started by his grandfather in Tannersville, Pennsylvania in 1840. He provided old age pensions to his employees. Aside from his business, Kistler ran a 120 acre model farm not far from Lock Haven.

He was also the vice president of the First National Bank of Lock Haven.

Kistler owned The Lock Haven Express Printing Company after its merger in 1917.

== Personal life ==
Sedgwick Kistler and his wife, Bertha Kaul, had one daughter Gertrude Kistler (b. August 11, 1907), who drowned in the Merced River on a family trip to Yosemite, California on July 7, 1920 at the age of 12.

Kistler himself, also at times along with his wife, funded many philanthropic projects. He funded the construction for housing for nurses at the Lock Haven hospital. He made donations to the Ross Library and local churches of various denominations. Kistler and his wife made generous donations to Rosemont College in Rosemont, Pennsylvania in memory of Gertrude. They specifically funded the construction of the library and annual student awards, both named in Gertrude’s honor.

Kistler was Presbyterian, and was locally involved with the Presbyterian Brotherhood in Lock Haven.

Party political offices
Preceded by Joe Guffey	Member of the Democratic National Committee from Pennsylvania; 1928–1936	Succeeded by George Earle
Preceded by William Wilson	Democratic nominee for U.S. Senator from Pennsylvania (Class 3); 1930	Succeeded by Lawrence Rupp
