= Frederick B. Kerr =

American politician (1876–1962)

Adjutant General of Pennsylvania
- In office 1935–1939
- Preceded by: David J. Davis
- Succeeded by: Edward Martin

Personal details
- Born: October 28, 1876 Clearfield, Pennsylvania, U.S.
- Died: November 1, 1962 (aged 86) Clearfield, Pennsylvania, U.S.
- Party: Democratic
- Education: United States Military Academy

Military service
- Allegiance: United States
- Branch/service: United States Army; Pennsylvania National Guard
- Years of service: 1899–1904 (Army); 1917–1919 (Army); 1935–1939(National Guard)
- Rank: Brigadier general
- Battles/wars: Philippine–American War; World War I

Frederick Blair Kerr (October 28, 1876 – November 1, 1962) was an American military officer and politician who was Adjutant General of Pennsylvania from 1935 to 1939. He was the Democratic nominee in the 1922 United States Senate special election and the 1932 United States House of Representatives election in Pennsylvania's 23rd congressional district.

== Early life ==
Kerr was born on October 28, 1876. His father, James Kerr, was a member of the United States House of Representatives.

== Military service ==
Kerr graduated from the United States Military Academy in 1899, ranked 58th in his class. He saw action in the Philippine–American War and was recommended for a brevet "for conspicuous gallantry in action at Rio Anayo Balaga, September 28, 1899, in conducting energetically and zealously reinforcements from the left to right of the line while under a severe front and flank fire from the enemy". He was made a first lieutenant in the 22nd Infantry Regiment on December 11, 1900. On September 4, 1902, he married Emily Bigler, daughter of former Internal Revenue Collector E. A. Bigler and granddaughter of former Governor William Bigler. Kerr resigned from the United States Army on March 19, 1904.

After leaving the Army, Kerr served as president and general manager of the Potts Run Coal Co. He returned to the Army during World War I, receiving a commission in reserve on November 1, 1917. He became a Major in the United States Army Ordnance Corps on November 8, 1917, then a lieutenant colonel in the 23rd Engineer Battalion on January 28, 1918. Kerr served as the regimental commander for almost all of the time the unit spent with the American Expeditionary Forces in France. He was promoted to Colonel on September 27, 1918. He was the engineer officer in charge of construction in Montierchaume from June 1 to October 15, 1918 and assistant engineer and engineer of roads for the First Army from October 20 to November 11, 1918. The regiment then performed road work in areas previously occupied by the First and Second Armies. They returned to the United States on June 8, 1919 and were demobilized at Camp Devens on June 16, 1919.

== Politics ==
In 1922, Kerr was the Democratic nominee in the special election to fill the remainder of the late Boies Penrose's term in the United States Senate. Republican George W. Pepper defeated Kerr 819,507 votes to 468,330.

In 1932, Kerr challenged incumbent Republican J. Banks Kurtz in Pennsylvania's 23rd congressional district. Kurtz had a record of supporting Prohibition while Kerr supported the repeal and modification of the Volstead Act. Kurtz narrowly defeated Kerr 35,342 votes to 33,950.

== Adjutant General of Pennsylvania ==
Kerr was appointed Adjutant General of Pennsylvania by Governor George Howard Earle III. At 58, he was the oldest member of Earle's cabinet. During Kerr's tenure, the Pennsylvania General Assembly passed legislation to create two African-American battalions, but the Pennsylvania National Guard required permission from the Federal government to organize the units. Several bills were introduced in Congress, but none were acted upon. He was not retained by Governor Arthur James, who replaced him with Edward Martin.

== Death ==
Kerr died on November 1, 1962 at his home in Clearfield, Pennsylvania. He was survived by his wife and three children.
