= Herbert T. Ames =

American lawyer

Herbert Thomas Ames
- Born: June 7, 1844; Tioga County, Pennsylvania
- Died: August 3, 1936 (aged 92); Williamsport, Pennsylvania
- Occupations: Mayor of Williamsport, Pennsylvania (1928-1932)
- Notable work: Prohibition Party candidate for Governor of Pennsylvania
- Spouse: Lizzie Wise (m. December 21, 1886)
- Parent(s): Thomas W. and Mary (Card) Ames

Herbert Thomas Ames (June 7, 1844 – August 3, 1936) was the mayor of the city of Williamsport, Pennsylvania, United States, from 1928 to 1932. In 1934, at the age of 90, he was the Prohibition Party's candidate for Governor of Pennsylvania. Ames was born in Sullivan Township, Tioga County, Pennsylvania.

He came to Williamsport in July 1869, which was then the lumber capital of Pennsylvania, and resided there until his death, August 3, 1936. Mr. Ames was married, December 21, 1886, to Lizzie W., daughter of Jacob Wise, of Lycoming County, Pennsylvania. They had two children, Thomas W. Ames of 338 High Street, Williamsport and Mary, wife of Dr. Herbert P. Haskin, 324 High Street, Williamsport. He formed a partnership with Thomas H. Hammond in 1886.The firm of Ames & Hammond was a well-known legal firm of Williamsport.

He was a member of Pine Street Methodist Episcopal church, Williamsport. Ames attended Mansfield Normal School, now Mansfield University. He was listed as the College's former oldest living alumnus in his August 1936 obituary.

Political offices
Preceded by Hugh Gilmore	Mayor of Williamsport, Pennsylvania; 1928–1932	Succeeded by George K. Harris
