= 1934 United States Senate election in Pennsylvania =

- November 6, 1934
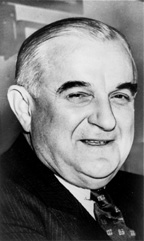

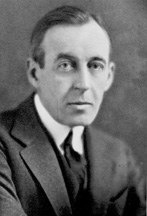
Nominee	Joseph F. Guffey	David A. Reed
Party	Democratic	Republican
Popular vote	1,494,010	1,366,872
Percentage	50.78%	46.46%
- County results Guffey: 40–50% 50–60% 60–70% Martin: 40–50% 50–60% 60–70%
U.S. senator before election
David A. Reed
Republican
Elected U.S. Senator
Joseph F. Guffey
Democratic

The 1934 United States Senate election in Pennsylvania was held on November 6, 1934. Incumbent Republican U.S. Senator David A. Reed sought re-election to another term, but was defeated by Democratic nominee Joseph F. Guffey.

This was the first time Democrats won a Senate seat in the state since 1881. As of 2023, this is the last time the following counties have voted Democratic in a Senate election: Adams, Blair, Bedford, Cumberland, Franklin, Juniata, and Pike.

== Democratic primary ==
=== Candidates ===
- Joseph F. Guffey, former member of the Democratic National Committee

== Republican primary ==
=== Candidates ===
- David A. Reed, incumbent U.S. Senator
- Gifford Pinchot, former Governor

== General election ==
=== Results ===
1934 U.S. Senate election in Pennsylvania
Party	Candidate	Votes	%	±%
Democratic	Joseph F. Guffey	1,494,010	50.78%	+16.78%
Republican	David A. Reed (inc.)	1,366,872	46.46%	−17.92%
Socialist	James H. Maurer	50,444	0.39%	−0.37%
Prohibition	Edwin J. Fithian	19,985	0.68%	+0.19%
Communist	Harry M. Wicks	6,170	0.21%	+0.21%
Socialist Labor	George W. Ohls	4,665	0.16%	+0.12%
N/A	Other	129	0.00%	N/A
Totals		2,942,275	100.00%	
