= 1922 United States Senate elections in Pennsylvania =

1922 United States Senate election in Pennsylvania
- November 7, 1922
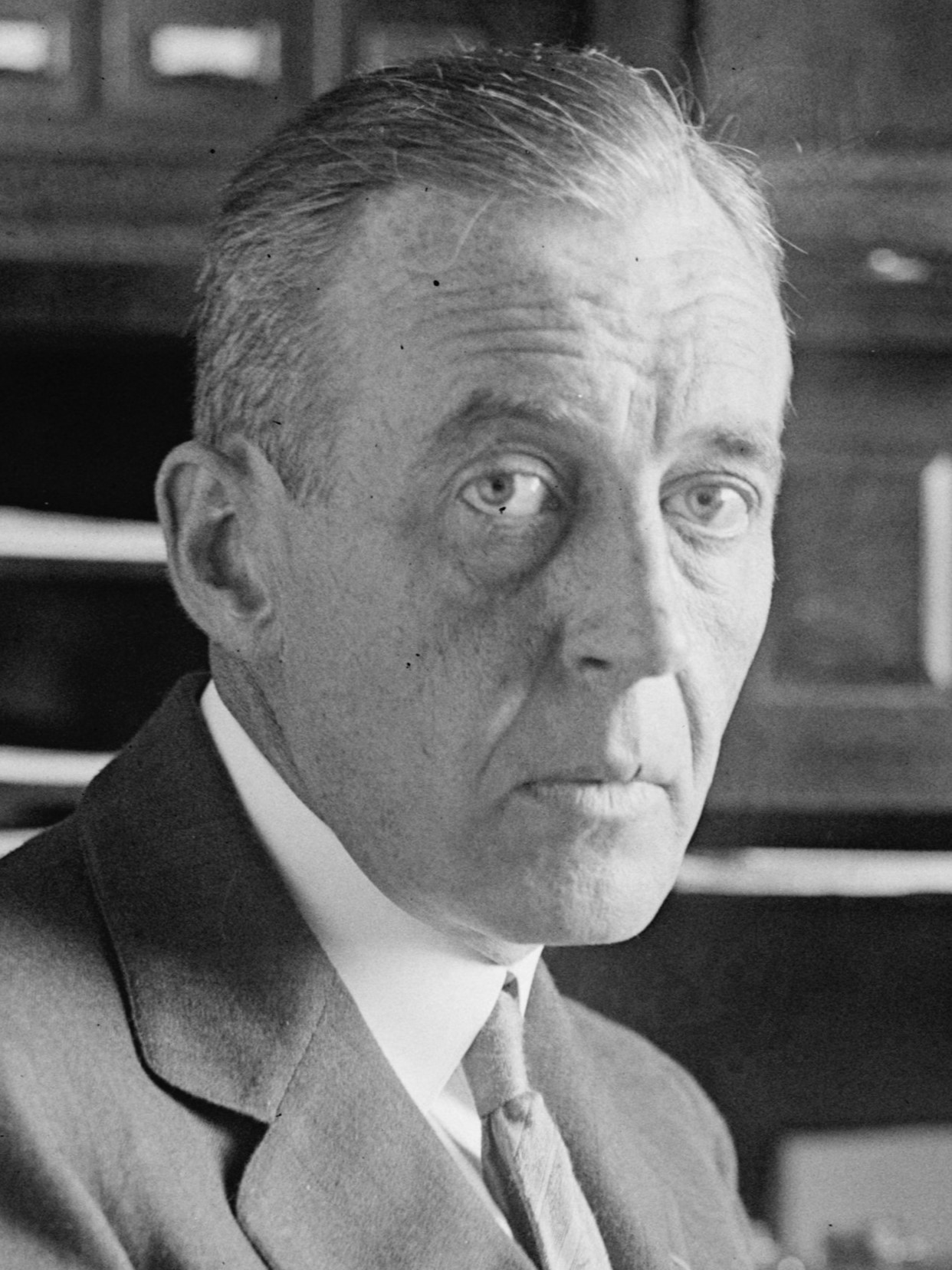

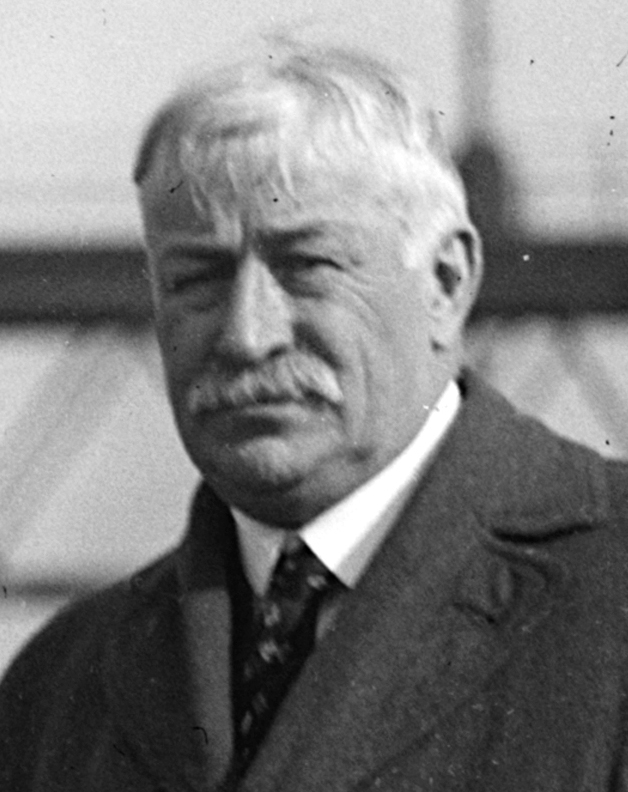
Nominee	David A. Reed	Samuel E. Shull	William J. Burke
Party	Republican	Democratic	Progressive
Popular vote	802,146	434,583	127,180
Percentage	55.61%	30.13%	8.82%
- County results Reed: 50–60% 60–70% 70–80% 80–90% Shull: 40–50% 50–60% 60–70% 70–80%
U.S. senator before election
David A. Reed
Republican
Elected U.S. Senator
David A. Reed
Republican

The 1922 United States Senate elections in Pennsylvania were held on November 7. David A. Reed, who was appointed in August 1922 to fill the vacancy created by the death of William E. Crow, was elected both to complete the remainder of Crow's term, ending in March 1923, and to a full six-year term in his own right, beginning upon the expiration of Crow's term.

== Background ==
Incumbent senator Philander C. Knox, who was elected in 1916 for a term set to expire in 1923, died on October 12, 1921. Pennsylvania governor William Cameron Sproul appointed state senator William E. Crow to fill the vacant seat on October 24 until a successor could be duly elected. The special election to complete Knox's term was scheduled for November 7, 1922, simultaneous with an election to the next term.

On December 31, 1921, senior U.S. senator Boies Penrose also died, creating another vacancy and setting off a contest for control of the Pennsylvania Republican Party.

Primary elections were held on May 16. Crow, who was ill, was not a candidate in the primary election and died himself on August 2. Sproul appointed David A. Reed, who by then had been nominated by the Republican Party for both elections to this seat, to fill the vacant seat until a successor could be duly elected.

== Republican primaries ==
=== Candidates ===
- John C. Lowry
- David A. Reed, Pittsburgh attorney and World War I field artillery major

==== Withdrew ====
- William J. Burke, U.S. representative from Pittsburgh (to run in the concurrent special election to complete Boies Penrose's term)
- William E. Crow, interim U.S. senator

=== Special primary ===
1922 U.S. Senate special Republican primary
Party	Candidate	Votes	%
Republican	David A. Reed	817,959	99.94%
Write-in		466	0.06%
Total votes		818,425	100.00%

=== Regular primary ===
1922 U.S. Senate Republican primary
Party	Candidate	Votes	%
Republican	David A. Reed	768,590	89.99%
Republican	John C. Lowry	85,469	10.01%
Total votes		854,059	100.00%

== General elections ==
=== Candidates ===
- David A. Reed, Pittsburgh attorney and interim U.S. senator (Republican)
- Rachel C. Robinson (Prohibition)
- William J. Van Essen (Socialist)

=== Special election results ===
1922 U.S. Senate special election in Pennsylvania (Class I)
Party	Candidate	Votes	%	±%
Republican	David A. Reed (inc.)	860,483	86.17%	▲29.86
Prohibition	Rachel C. Robinson	60,390	6.05%	▲3.56
Socialist	William J. Van Essen	55,703	5.58%	▲1.82
Single Tax	Thomas J. Davis	21,997	2.20%	▲2.08
Write-in		287	0.00%	N/A
Total votes		998,860	100.00%	

=== Candidates ===
- William J. Burke, U.S. representative from Pittsburgh (representing Pennsylvania at-large) (Progressive)
- David A. Reed, Pittsburgh attorney and interim U.S. senator (Republican)
- Rachel C. Robinson (Prohibition)
- Charles J. Schoales (Single Tax)
- Charles Sehl (Socialist)
- Samuel E. Shull (Democratic)

=== General election results ===
1922 U.S. Senate election in Pennsylvania
Party	Candidate	Votes	%	±%
Republican	David A. Reed (inc.)	802,146	55.61%	▼0.70
Democratic	Samuel E. Shull	434,583	30.13%	▼7.12
Progressive	William J. Burke	127,180	8.82%	▲8.82
Prohibition	Rachel C. Robinson	41,935	2.91%	▲0.42
Socialist	Charles Sehl	33,004	2.29%	▼1.47
Single Tax	Charles J. Schoales	3,596	0.25%	▲0.13
Write-in		41	0.00%	N/A
Total votes		1,442,485	100.00%	
