= List of United States senators from Pennsylvania =

Current delegation

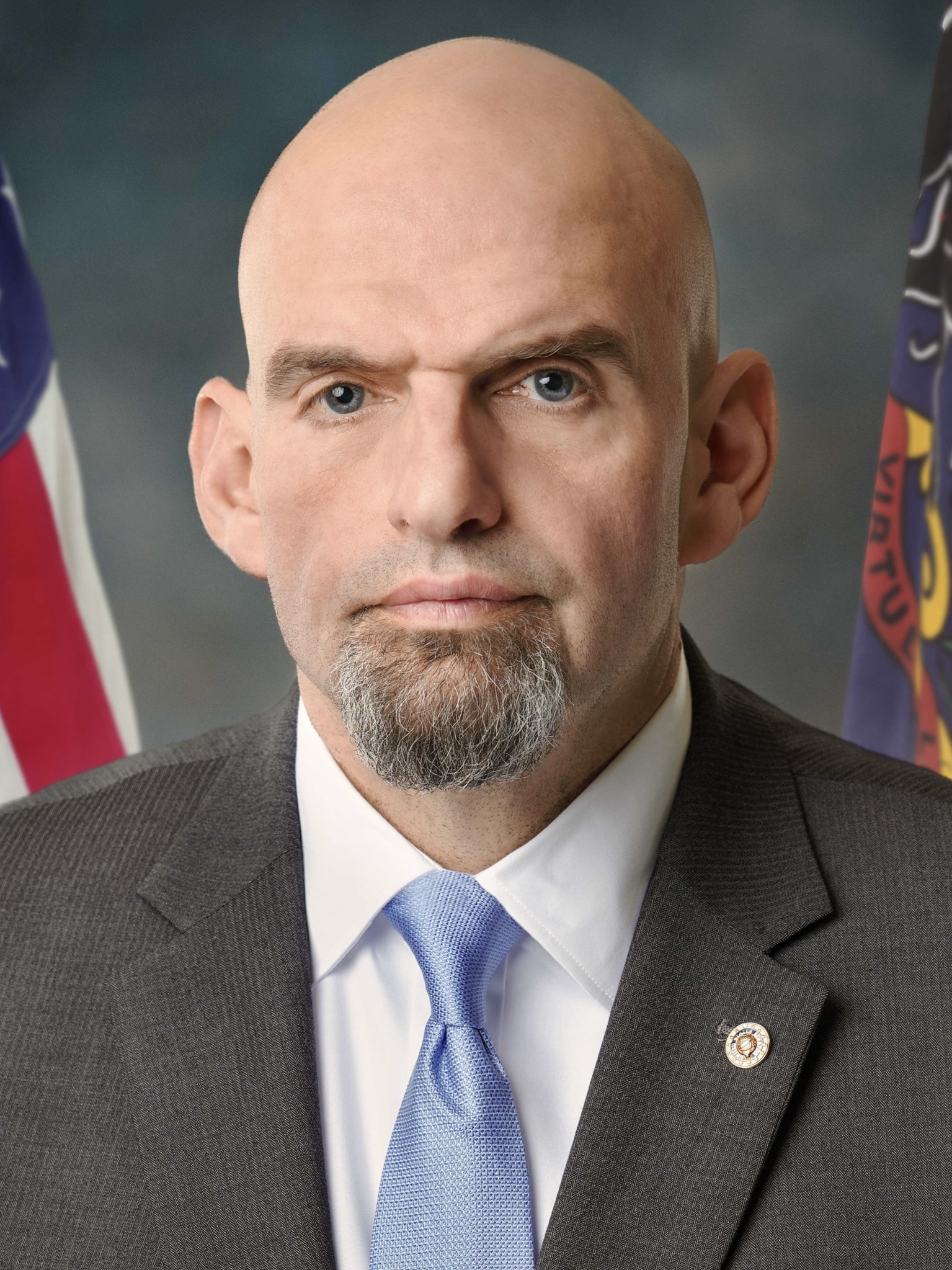
John Fetterman (D)

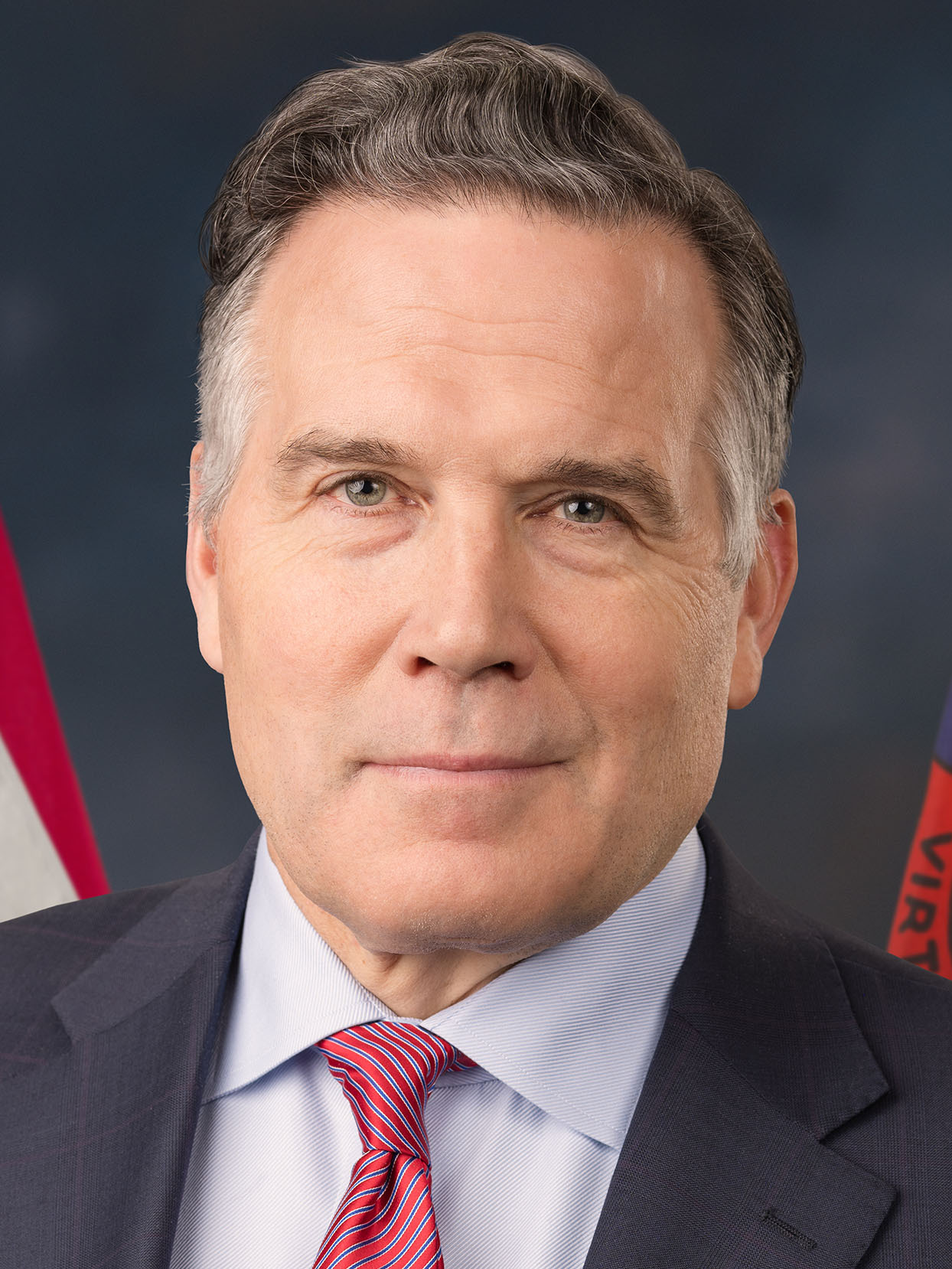
Dave McCormick (R)

(ordered by seniority)

Pennsylvania ratified the United States Constitution on December 12, 1787, and elects its U.S. senators to class 1 and class 3. Officeholders are popularly elected, for a six-year term, beginning January 3. Elections are held the first Tuesday after November 1. Before 1914, they were chosen by the Pennsylvania General Assembly; before 1935, their terms began March 4. The state's current U.S. senators are Democrat John Fetterman (since 2023) and Republican Dave McCormick (since 2025), making it one of four states to have a split Senate delegation, along with Maine, Vermont, and Wisconsin. Arlen Specter was Pennsylvania's longest-serving senator (1981–2011).

== List of senators ==
Class 1 Class 1 senators belong to the electoral cycle that most recently had regular elections in 2006, 2012, 2018, and 2024. The next election will be in 2030.						C	Class 3 Class 3 senators belong to the electoral cycle that most recently had regular elections in 2004, 2010, 2016, and 2022. The next election will be in 2028.					
#	Senator	Party	Dates in office	Electoral history	T	C	T	Electoral history	Dates in office	Party	Senator	#
1	William Maclay (Sunbury)	Anti- Admin.	Mar 4, 1789 – Mar 3, 1791	Elected in 1788. Lost re-election.	1	1st	1	Elected in 1788. Retired.	Mar 4, 1789 – Mar 3, 1795	Pro- Admin.	Robert Morris (Philadelphia)	1
Vacant			Mar 4, 1791 – Dec 1, 1793	Legislature failed to elect.	2	2nd	1	Elected in 1788. Retired.	Mar 4, 1789 – Mar 3, 1795	Pro- Admin.	Robert Morris (Philadelphia)	1
2	Albert Gallatin (New Geneva)	Anti- Admin.	Dec 2, 1793 – Feb 28, 1794	Elected to finish the vacant term. Election voided.	2	2nd	1	Elected in 1788. Retired.	Mar 4, 1789 – Mar 3, 1795	Pro- Admin.	Robert Morris (Philadelphia)	1
2	Albert Gallatin (New Geneva)	Anti- Admin.	Dec 2, 1793 – Feb 28, 1794	Elected to finish the vacant term. Election voided.	2	3rd	1	Elected in 1788. Retired.	Mar 4, 1789 – Mar 3, 1795	Pro- Admin.	Robert Morris (Philadelphia)	1
Vacant			Mar 1, 1794 – Apr 23, 1794		2	3rd	1	Elected in 1788. Retired.	Mar 4, 1789 – Mar 3, 1795	Pro- Admin.	Robert Morris (Philadelphia)	1
3	James Ross (Pittsburgh)	Pro- Admin.	Apr 24, 1794 – Mar 3, 1803	Elected to finish the vacant term that happened from 1791 to 1793.	2	3rd	1	Elected in 1788. Retired.	Mar 4, 1789 – Mar 3, 1795	Pro- Admin.	Robert Morris (Philadelphia)	1
3	James Ross (Pittsburgh)	Federalist	Apr 24, 1794 – Mar 3, 1803	Elected to finish the vacant term that happened from 1791 to 1793.	2	4th	2	Elected in 1795. Retired.	Mar 4, 1795 – Mar 3, 1801	Federalist	William Bingham (Philadelphia)	2
3	James Ross (Pittsburgh)	Federalist	Apr 24, 1794 – Mar 3, 1803	Re-elected in 1797. Retired.	3	5th	2	Elected in 1795. Retired.	Mar 4, 1795 – Mar 3, 1801	Federalist	William Bingham (Philadelphia)	2
3	James Ross (Pittsburgh)	Federalist	Apr 24, 1794 – Mar 3, 1803	Re-elected in 1797. Retired.	3	6th	2	Elected in 1795. Retired.	Mar 4, 1795 – Mar 3, 1801	Federalist	William Bingham (Philadelphia)	2
3	James Ross (Pittsburgh)	Federalist	Apr 24, 1794 – Mar 3, 1803	Re-elected in 1797. Retired.	3	7th	3	Elected in 1801. Resigned to become Supervisor of Revenue of Pennsylvania.	Mar 4, 1801 – Jun 30, 1801	Democratic- Republican	Peter Muhlenberg (Montgomery County)	3
3	James Ross (Pittsburgh)	Federalist	Apr 24, 1794 – Mar 3, 1803	Re-elected in 1797. Retired.	3	7th	3		Jun 30, 1801 – Dec 17, 1801	Vacant		
3	James Ross (Pittsburgh)	Federalist	Apr 24, 1794 – Mar 3, 1803	Re-elected in 1797. Retired.	3	7th	3	Elected to finish Muhlenberg's term. Retired.	Dec 17, 1801 – Mar 3, 1807	Democratic- Republican	George Logan (Philadelphia)	4
4	Samuel Maclay (Lewisburg)	Democratic- Republican	Mar 4, 1803 – Jan 4, 1809	Elected in 1802. Resigned.	4	8th	3	Elected to finish Muhlenberg's term. Retired.	Dec 17, 1801 – Mar 3, 1807	Democratic- Republican	George Logan (Philadelphia)	4
4	Samuel Maclay (Lewisburg)	Democratic- Republican	Mar 4, 1803 – Jan 4, 1809	Elected in 1802. Resigned.	4	9th	3	Elected to finish Muhlenberg's term. Retired.	Dec 17, 1801 – Mar 3, 1807	Democratic- Republican	George Logan (Philadelphia)	4
4	Samuel Maclay (Lewisburg)	Democratic- Republican	Mar 4, 1803 – Jan 4, 1809	Elected in 1802. Resigned.	4	10th	4	Elected in 1806. Retired.	Mar 4, 1807 – Mar 3, 1813	Democratic- Republican	Andrew Gregg (Penn Valley)	5
Vacant			Jan 4, 1809 – Jan 9, 1809	Vacant	4	10th	4	Elected in 1806. Retired.	Mar 4, 1807 – Mar 3, 1813	Democratic- Republican	Andrew Gregg (Penn Valley)	5
5	Michael Leib (Philadelphia)	Democratic- Republican	Jan 9, 1809 – Feb 14, 1814	Elected in 1809 to finish Maclay's term, having been elected to the next term.	4	10th	4	Elected in 1806. Retired.	Mar 4, 1807 – Mar 3, 1813	Democratic- Republican	Andrew Gregg (Penn Valley)	5
5	Michael Leib (Philadelphia)	Democratic- Republican	Jan 9, 1809 – Feb 14, 1814	Elected in 1808. Resigned to become Postmaster of Philadelphia.	5	11th	4	Elected in 1806. Retired.	Mar 4, 1807 – Mar 3, 1813	Democratic- Republican	Andrew Gregg (Penn Valley)	5
5	Michael Leib (Philadelphia)	Democratic- Republican	Jan 9, 1809 – Feb 14, 1814	Elected in 1808. Resigned to become Postmaster of Philadelphia.	5	12th	4	Elected in 1806. Retired.	Mar 4, 1807 – Mar 3, 1813	Democratic- Republican	Andrew Gregg (Penn Valley)	5
5	Michael Leib (Philadelphia)	Democratic- Republican	Jan 9, 1809 – Feb 14, 1814	Elected in 1808. Resigned to become Postmaster of Philadelphia.	5	13th	5	Elected in 1812. Retired.	Mar 4, 1813 – Mar 3, 1819	Democratic- Republican	Abner Lacock (Beaver)	6
Vacant			Feb 14, 1814 – Feb 24, 1814		5	13th	5	Elected in 1812. Retired.	Mar 4, 1813 – Mar 3, 1819	Democratic- Republican	Abner Lacock (Beaver)	6
6	Jonathan Roberts (Norristown)	Democratic- Republican	Feb 24, 1814 – Mar 3, 1821	Elected to finish Leib's term.	5	13th	5	Elected in 1812. Retired.	Mar 4, 1813 – Mar 3, 1819	Democratic- Republican	Abner Lacock (Beaver)	6
6	Jonathan Roberts (Norristown)	Democratic- Republican	Feb 24, 1814 – Mar 3, 1821	Re-elected in late 1814.	6	14th	5	Elected in 1812. Retired.	Mar 4, 1813 – Mar 3, 1819	Democratic- Republican	Abner Lacock (Beaver)	6
6	Jonathan Roberts (Norristown)	Democratic- Republican	Feb 24, 1814 – Mar 3, 1821	Re-elected in late 1814.	6	15th	5	Elected in 1812. Retired.	Mar 4, 1813 – Mar 3, 1819	Democratic- Republican	Abner Lacock (Beaver)	6
6	Jonathan Roberts (Norristown)	Democratic- Republican	Feb 24, 1814 – Mar 3, 1821	Re-elected in late 1814.	6	16th	6	Elected in 1818. Retired.	Mar 4, 1819 – Mar 3, 1825	Democratic- Republican	Walter Lowrie (Butler)	7
Vacant			Mar 4, 1821 – Dec 10, 1821	Legislature failed to elect.	7	17th	6	Elected in 1818. Retired.	Mar 4, 1819 – Mar 3, 1825	Democratic- Republican	Walter Lowrie (Butler)	7
7	William Findlay (Franklintown)	Democratic- Republican	Dec 10, 1821 – Mar 3, 1827	Elected late in 1821. Retired.	7	17th	6	Elected in 1818. Retired.	Mar 4, 1819 – Mar 3, 1825	Democratic- Republican	Walter Lowrie (Butler)	7
7	William Findlay (Franklintown)	Democratic- Republican	Dec 10, 1821 – Mar 3, 1827	Elected late in 1821. Retired.	7	18th	6	Elected in 1818. Retired.	Mar 4, 1819 – Mar 3, 1825	Democratic- Republican	Walter Lowrie (Butler)	7
7	William Findlay (Franklintown)	Jacksonian	Dec 10, 1821 – Mar 3, 1827	Elected late in 1821. Retired.	7	19th	7	Elected in 1825. Lost re-election.	Mar 4, 1825 – Mar 3, 1831	National; Republican	William Marks (Pittsburgh)	8
8	Isaac D. Barnard (West Chester)	Jacksonian	Mar 4, 1827 – Dec 6, 1831	Elected in 1826. Resigned to due ill health.	8	20th	7	Elected in 1825. Lost re-election.	Mar 4, 1825 – Mar 3, 1831	National; Republican	William Marks (Pittsburgh)	8
8	Isaac D. Barnard (West Chester)	Jacksonian	Mar 4, 1827 – Dec 6, 1831	Elected in 1826. Resigned to due ill health.	8	21st	7	Elected in 1825. Lost re-election.	Mar 4, 1825 – Mar 3, 1831	National; Republican	William Marks (Pittsburgh)	8
8	Isaac D. Barnard (West Chester)	Jacksonian	Mar 4, 1827 – Dec 6, 1831	Elected in 1826. Resigned to due ill health.	8	22nd	8	Elected in 1830. Resigned to become U.S. Minister to Russia.	Mar 4, 1831 – Jun 30, 1834	Jacksonian	William Wilkins (Pittsburgh)	9
Vacant			Dec 6, 1831 – Dec 13, 1831		8	22nd	8	Elected in 1830. Resigned to become U.S. Minister to Russia.	Mar 4, 1831 – Jun 30, 1834	Jacksonian	William Wilkins (Pittsburgh)	9
9	George M. Dallas (Philadelphia)	Jacksonian	Dec 13, 1831 – Mar 3, 1833	Elected to finish Barnard's term. Retired.	8	22nd	8	Elected in 1830. Resigned to become U.S. Minister to Russia.	Mar 4, 1831 – Jun 30, 1834	Jacksonian	William Wilkins (Pittsburgh)	9
Vacant			Mar 4, 1833 – Dec 7, 1833	Legislature failed to elect.	9	23rd	8	Elected in 1830. Resigned to become U.S. Minister to Russia.	Mar 4, 1831 – Jun 30, 1834	Jacksonian	William Wilkins (Pittsburgh)	9
10	Samuel McKean (Burlington)	Jacksonian	Dec 7, 1833 – Mar 3, 1839	Elected late in 1833.	9	23rd	8	Elected in 1830. Resigned to become U.S. Minister to Russia.	Mar 4, 1831 – Jun 30, 1834	Jacksonian	William Wilkins (Pittsburgh)	9
10	Samuel McKean (Burlington)	Jacksonian	Dec 7, 1833 – Mar 3, 1839	Elected late in 1833.	9	23rd	8		Jun 30, 1834 – Dec 6, 1834	Vacant		
10	Samuel McKean (Burlington)	Jacksonian	Dec 7, 1833 – Mar 3, 1839	Elected late in 1833.	9	23rd	8	Elected to finish Wilkins's term.	Dec 6, 1834 – Mar 5, 1845	Jacksonian	James Buchanan (Lancaster)	10
10	Samuel McKean (Burlington)	Jacksonian	Dec 7, 1833 – Mar 3, 1839	Elected late in 1833.	9	24th	8	Elected to finish Wilkins's term.	Dec 6, 1834 – Mar 5, 1845	Jacksonian	James Buchanan (Lancaster)	10
10	Samuel McKean (Burlington)	Democratic	Dec 7, 1833 – Mar 3, 1839	Elected late in 1833.	9	25th	9	Re-elected in 1836.	Dec 6, 1834 – Mar 5, 1845	Democratic	James Buchanan (Lancaster)	10
Vacant			Mar 4, 1839 – Jan 14, 1840	Legislature failed to elect.	10	26th	9	Re-elected in 1836.	Dec 6, 1834 – Mar 5, 1845	Democratic	James Buchanan (Lancaster)	10
11	Daniel Sturgeon (Uniontown)	Democratic	Jan 14, 1840 – Mar 3, 1851	Elected late in 1840.	10	26th	9	Re-elected in 1836.	Dec 6, 1834 – Mar 5, 1845	Democratic	James Buchanan (Lancaster)	10
11	Daniel Sturgeon (Uniontown)	Democratic	Jan 14, 1840 – Mar 3, 1851	Elected late in 1840.	10	27th	9	Re-elected in 1836.	Dec 6, 1834 – Mar 5, 1845	Democratic	James Buchanan (Lancaster)	10
11	Daniel Sturgeon (Uniontown)	Democratic	Jan 14, 1840 – Mar 3, 1851	Elected late in 1840.	10	28th	10	Re-elected in 1843. Resigned to become U.S. Secretary of State.	Dec 6, 1834 – Mar 5, 1845	Democratic	James Buchanan (Lancaster)	10
11	Daniel Sturgeon (Uniontown)	Democratic	Jan 14, 1840 – Mar 3, 1851	Re-elected in 1845. Retired.	11	29th	10	Re-elected in 1843. Resigned to become U.S. Secretary of State.	Dec 6, 1834 – Mar 5, 1845	Democratic	James Buchanan (Lancaster)	10
11	Daniel Sturgeon (Uniontown)	Democratic	Jan 14, 1840 – Mar 3, 1851	Re-elected in 1845. Retired.	11	29th	10		Mar 5, 1845 – Mar 13, 1845	Vacant		
11	Daniel Sturgeon (Uniontown)	Democratic	Jan 14, 1840 – Mar 3, 1851	Re-elected in 1845. Retired.	11	29th	10	Elected in 1845 to finish Buchanan's term. Retired.	Mar 13, 1845 – Mar 3, 1849	Democratic	Simon Cameron (Middletown)	11
11	Daniel Sturgeon (Uniontown)	Democratic	Jan 14, 1840 – Mar 3, 1851	Re-elected in 1845. Retired.	11	30th	10	Elected in 1845 to finish Buchanan's term. Retired.	Mar 13, 1845 – Mar 3, 1849	Democratic	Simon Cameron (Middletown)	11
11	Daniel Sturgeon (Uniontown)	Democratic	Jan 14, 1840 – Mar 3, 1851	Re-elected in 1845. Retired.	11	31st	11	Elected in 1849.	Mar 4, 1849 – Mar 3, 1855	Whig	James Cooper (Pottsville)	12
12	Richard Brodhead (Easton)	Democratic	Mar 4, 1851 – Mar 3, 1857	Elected in 1851.	12	32nd	11	Elected in 1849.	Mar 4, 1849 – Mar 3, 1855	Whig	James Cooper (Pottsville)	12
12	Richard Brodhead (Easton)	Democratic	Mar 4, 1851 – Mar 3, 1857	Elected in 1851.	12	33rd	11	Elected in 1849.	Mar 4, 1849 – Mar 3, 1855	Whig	James Cooper (Pottsville)	12
12	Richard Brodhead (Easton)	Democratic	Mar 4, 1851 – Mar 3, 1857	Elected in 1851.	12	34th	12	Legislature failed to elect.	Mar 4, 1855 – Jan 14, 1856	Vacant		
12	Richard Brodhead (Easton)	Democratic	Mar 4, 1851 – Mar 3, 1857	Elected in 1851.	12	34th	12	Elected late in 1856. Retired.	Jan 14, 1856 – Mar 3, 1861	Democratic	William Bigler (Clearfield)	13
13	Simon Cameron (Harrisburg)	Republican	Mar 4, 1857 – Mar 4, 1861	Elected in 1857. Resigned to become U.S. Secretary of War.	13	35th	12	Elected late in 1856. Retired.	Jan 14, 1856 – Mar 3, 1861	Democratic	William Bigler (Clearfield)	13
13	Simon Cameron (Harrisburg)	Republican	Mar 4, 1857 – Mar 4, 1861	Elected in 1857. Resigned to become U.S. Secretary of War.	13	36th	12	Elected late in 1856. Retired.	Jan 14, 1856 – Mar 3, 1861	Democratic	William Bigler (Clearfield)	13
Vacant			Mar 4, 1861 – Mar 14, 1861		13	37th	13	Elected in 1861. Lost re-election.	Mar 4, 1861 – Mar 3, 1867	Republican	Edgar Cowan (Greensburg)	14
14	David Wilmot (Towanda)	Republican	Mar 14, 1861 – Mar 3, 1863	Elected in 1861 to finish Cameron's term. Retired.	13	37th	13	Elected in 1861. Lost re-election.	Mar 4, 1861 – Mar 3, 1867	Republican	Edgar Cowan (Greensburg)	14
15	Charles R. Buckalew (Bloomsburg)	Democratic	Mar 4, 1863 – Mar 3, 1869	Elected in 1863.	14	38th	13	Elected in 1861. Lost re-election.	Mar 4, 1861 – Mar 3, 1867	Republican	Edgar Cowan (Greensburg)	14
15	Charles R. Buckalew (Bloomsburg)	Democratic	Mar 4, 1863 – Mar 3, 1869	Elected in 1863.	14	39th	13	Elected in 1861. Lost re-election.	Mar 4, 1861 – Mar 3, 1867	Republican	Edgar Cowan (Greensburg)	14
15	Charles R. Buckalew (Bloomsburg)	Democratic	Mar 4, 1863 – Mar 3, 1869	Elected in 1863.	14	40th	14	Elected in 1867.	Mar 4, 1867 – Mar 12, 1877	Republican	Simon Cameron (Harrisburg)	15
16	John Scott (Huntingdon)	Republican	Mar 4, 1869 – Mar 3, 1875	Elected in 1869. Retired.	15	41st	14	Elected in 1867.	Mar 4, 1867 – Mar 12, 1877	Republican	Simon Cameron (Harrisburg)	15
16	John Scott (Huntingdon)	Republican	Mar 4, 1869 – Mar 3, 1875	Elected in 1869. Retired.	15	42nd	14	Elected in 1867.	Mar 4, 1867 – Mar 12, 1877	Republican	Simon Cameron (Harrisburg)	15
16	John Scott (Huntingdon)	Republican	Mar 4, 1869 – Mar 3, 1875	Elected in 1869. Retired.	15	43rd	15	Re-elected in 1873. Resigned.	Mar 4, 1867 – Mar 12, 1877	Republican	Simon Cameron (Harrisburg)	15
17	William A. Wallace (Clearfield)	Democratic	Mar 4, 1875 – Mar 3, 1881	Elected in 1875. Lost re-election.	16	44th	15	Re-elected in 1873. Resigned.	Mar 4, 1867 – Mar 12, 1877	Republican	Simon Cameron (Harrisburg)	15
17	William A. Wallace (Clearfield)	Democratic	Mar 4, 1875 – Mar 3, 1881	Elected in 1875. Lost re-election.	16	45th	15	Re-elected in 1873. Resigned.	Mar 4, 1867 – Mar 12, 1877	Republican	Simon Cameron (Harrisburg)	15
17	William A. Wallace (Clearfield)	Democratic	Mar 4, 1875 – Mar 3, 1881	Elected in 1875. Lost re-election.	16	45th	15		Mar 12, 1877 – Mar 20, 1877	Vacant		
17	William A. Wallace (Clearfield)	Democratic	Mar 4, 1875 – Mar 3, 1881	Elected in 1875. Lost re-election.	16	45th	15	Elected in 1877 to finish his father's term.	Mar 20, 1877 – Mar 3, 1897	Republican	J. Donald Cameron (Harrisburg)	16
17	William A. Wallace (Clearfield)	Democratic	Mar 4, 1875 – Mar 3, 1881	Elected in 1875. Lost re-election.	16	46th	16	Re-elected in 1879.	Mar 20, 1877 – Mar 3, 1897	Republican	J. Donald Cameron (Harrisburg)	16
18	John I. Mitchell (Wellsboro)	Republican	Mar 4, 1881 – Mar 3, 1887	Elected in 1881.	17	47th	16	Re-elected in 1879.	Mar 20, 1877 – Mar 3, 1897	Republican	J. Donald Cameron (Harrisburg)	16
18	John I. Mitchell (Wellsboro)	Republican	Mar 4, 1881 – Mar 3, 1887	Elected in 1881.	17	48th	16	Re-elected in 1879.	Mar 20, 1877 – Mar 3, 1897	Republican	J. Donald Cameron (Harrisburg)	16
18	John I. Mitchell (Wellsboro)	Republican	Mar 4, 1881 – Mar 3, 1887	Elected in 1881.	17	49th	17	Re-elected in 1885.	Mar 20, 1877 – Mar 3, 1897	Republican	J. Donald Cameron (Harrisburg)	16
19	Matthew Quay (Beaver)	Republican	Mar 4, 1887 – Mar 3, 1899	Elected in early 1887.	18	50th	17	Re-elected in 1885.	Mar 20, 1877 – Mar 3, 1897	Republican	J. Donald Cameron (Harrisburg)	16
19	Matthew Quay (Beaver)	Republican	Mar 4, 1887 – Mar 3, 1899	Elected in early 1887.	18	51st	17	Re-elected in 1885.	Mar 20, 1877 – Mar 3, 1897	Republican	J. Donald Cameron (Harrisburg)	16
19	Matthew Quay (Beaver)	Republican	Mar 4, 1887 – Mar 3, 1899	Elected in early 1887.	18	52nd	18	Re-elected in 1891. Retired.	Mar 20, 1877 – Mar 3, 1897	Republican	J. Donald Cameron (Harrisburg)	16
19	Matthew Quay (Beaver)	Republican	Mar 4, 1887 – Mar 3, 1899	Re-elected in 1893. Legislature failed to re-elect.	19	53rd	18	Re-elected in 1891. Retired.	Mar 20, 1877 – Mar 3, 1897	Republican	J. Donald Cameron (Harrisburg)	16
19	Matthew Quay (Beaver)	Republican	Mar 4, 1887 – Mar 3, 1899	Re-elected in 1893. Legislature failed to re-elect.	19	54th	18	Re-elected in 1891. Retired.	Mar 20, 1877 – Mar 3, 1897	Republican	J. Donald Cameron (Harrisburg)	16
19	Matthew Quay (Beaver)	Republican	Mar 4, 1887 – Mar 3, 1899	Re-elected in 1893. Legislature failed to re-elect.	19	55th	19	Elected in 1897.	Mar 4, 1897 – Dec 31, 1921	Republican	Boies Penrose (Philadelphia)	17
19	Vacant		Mar 4, 1899 – Jan 16, 1901	Quay was appointed to continue the term, but the Senate rejected his appointment.	20	56th	19	Elected in 1897.	Mar 4, 1897 – Dec 31, 1921	Republican	Boies Penrose (Philadelphia)	17
19	Matthew Quay (Beaver)	Republican	Jan 16, 1901 – May 28, 1904	Elected late in 1901. Died.	20	56th	19	Elected in 1897.	Mar 4, 1897 – Dec 31, 1921	Republican	Boies Penrose (Philadelphia)	17
19	Matthew Quay (Beaver)	Republican	Jan 16, 1901 – May 28, 1904	Elected late in 1901. Died.	20	57th	19	Elected in 1897.	Mar 4, 1897 – Dec 31, 1921	Republican	Boies Penrose (Philadelphia)	17
19	Matthew Quay (Beaver)	Republican	Jan 16, 1901 – May 28, 1904	Elected late in 1901. Died.	20	58th	20	Re-elected in 1903.	Mar 4, 1897 – Dec 31, 1921	Republican	Boies Penrose (Philadelphia)	17
20	Philander C. Knox (Pittsburgh)	Republican	Jun 10, 1904 – Mar 3, 1909	Appointed to continue Quay's term. Elected in 1905 to finish Quay's term.	20	58th	20	Re-elected in 1903.	Mar 4, 1897 – Dec 31, 1921	Republican	Boies Penrose (Philadelphia)	17
20	Philander C. Knox (Pittsburgh)	Republican	Jun 10, 1904 – Mar 3, 1909	Re-elected in 1905. Resigned to become U.S. Secretary of State.	21	59th	20	Re-elected in 1903.	Mar 4, 1897 – Dec 31, 1921	Republican	Boies Penrose (Philadelphia)	17
20	Philander C. Knox (Pittsburgh)	Republican	Jun 10, 1904 – Mar 3, 1909	Re-elected in 1905. Resigned to become U.S. Secretary of State.	21	60th	20	Re-elected in 1903.	Mar 4, 1897 – Dec 31, 1921	Republican	Boies Penrose (Philadelphia)	17
Vacant			Mar 4, 1909 – Mar 17, 1909		21	61st	21	Re-elected in 1909.	Mar 4, 1897 – Dec 31, 1921	Republican	Boies Penrose (Philadelphia)	17
21	George T. Oliver (Pittsburgh)	Republican	Mar 17, 1909 – Mar 3, 1917	Elected to finish Knox's term	21	61st	21	Re-elected in 1909.	Mar 4, 1897 – Dec 31, 1921	Republican	Boies Penrose (Philadelphia)	17
21	George T. Oliver (Pittsburgh)	Republican	Mar 17, 1909 – Mar 3, 1917	Re-elected in 1911. Retired.	22	62nd	21	Re-elected in 1909.	Mar 4, 1897 – Dec 31, 1921	Republican	Boies Penrose (Philadelphia)	17
21	George T. Oliver (Pittsburgh)	Republican	Mar 17, 1909 – Mar 3, 1917	Re-elected in 1911. Retired.	22	63rd	21	Re-elected in 1909.	Mar 4, 1897 – Dec 31, 1921	Republican	Boies Penrose (Philadelphia)	17
21	George T. Oliver (Pittsburgh)	Republican	Mar 17, 1909 – Mar 3, 1917	Re-elected in 1911. Retired.	22	64th	22	Re-elected in 1914.	Mar 4, 1897 – Dec 31, 1921	Republican	Boies Penrose (Philadelphia)	17
22	Philander C. Knox (Pittsburgh)	Republican	Mar 4, 1917 – Oct 12, 1921	Elected in 1916. Died.	23	65th	22	Re-elected in 1914.	Mar 4, 1897 – Dec 31, 1921	Republican	Boies Penrose (Philadelphia)	17
22	Philander C. Knox (Pittsburgh)	Republican	Mar 4, 1917 – Oct 12, 1921	Elected in 1916. Died.	23	66th	22	Re-elected in 1914.	Mar 4, 1897 – Dec 31, 1921	Republican	Boies Penrose (Philadelphia)	17
22	Philander C. Knox (Pittsburgh)	Republican	Mar 4, 1917 – Oct 12, 1921	Elected in 1916. Died.	23	67th	23	Re-elected in 1920. Died.	Mar 4, 1897 – Dec 31, 1921	Republican	Boies Penrose (Philadelphia)	17
Vacant			Oct 12, 1921 – Oct 24, 1921		23	67th	23	Re-elected in 1920. Died.	Mar 4, 1897 – Dec 31, 1921	Republican	Boies Penrose (Philadelphia)	17
23	William E. Crow (Uniontown)	Republican	Oct 24, 1921 – Aug 2, 1922	Appointed to continue Knox's term. Died.	23	67th	23	Re-elected in 1920. Died.	Mar 4, 1897 – Dec 31, 1921	Republican	Boies Penrose (Philadelphia)	17
23	William E. Crow (Uniontown)	Republican	Oct 24, 1921 – Aug 2, 1922	Appointed to continue Knox's term. Died.	23	67th	23		Dec 31, 1921 – Jan 9, 1922	Vacant		
23	William E. Crow (Uniontown)	Republican	Oct 24, 1921 – Aug 2, 1922	Appointed to continue Knox's term. Died.	23	67th	23	Appointed to continue Penrose's term. Elected to finish Penrose's term. Lost renomination.	Jan 9, 1922 – Mar 3, 1927	Republican	George W. Pepper (Philadelphia)	18
Vacant			Aug 2, 1922 – Aug 8, 1922		23	67th	23	Appointed to continue Penrose's term. Elected to finish Penrose's term. Lost renomination.	Jan 9, 1922 – Mar 3, 1927	Republican	George W. Pepper (Philadelphia)	18
24	David A. Reed (Pittsburgh)	Republican	Aug 8, 1922 – Jan 3, 1935	Appointed to continue Knox's term. Elected to finish Knox's term.	23	67th	23	Appointed to continue Penrose's term. Elected to finish Penrose's term. Lost renomination.	Jan 9, 1922 – Mar 3, 1927	Republican	George W. Pepper (Philadelphia)	18
24	David A. Reed (Pittsburgh)	Republican	Aug 8, 1922 – Jan 3, 1935	Elected in 1922.	24	68th	23	Appointed to continue Penrose's term. Elected to finish Penrose's term. Lost renomination.	Jan 9, 1922 – Mar 3, 1927	Republican	George W. Pepper (Philadelphia)	18
24	David A. Reed (Pittsburgh)	Republican	Aug 8, 1922 – Jan 3, 1935	Elected in 1922.	24	69th	23	Appointed to continue Penrose's term. Elected to finish Penrose's term. Lost renomination.	Jan 9, 1922 – Mar 3, 1927	Republican	George W. Pepper (Philadelphia)	18
24	David A. Reed (Pittsburgh)	Republican	Aug 8, 1922 – Jan 3, 1935	Elected in 1922.	24	70th	24	William Scott Vare (R) was elected in 1926, but the Governor refused to certify the election and the Senate refused to qualify him.	Mar 4, 1927 – Dec 9, 1929	Vacant		
24	David A. Reed (Pittsburgh)	Republican	Aug 8, 1922 – Jan 3, 1935	Re-elected in 1928. Lost re-election.	25	71st	24	William Scott Vare (R) was elected in 1926, but the Governor refused to certify the election and the Senate refused to qualify him.	Mar 4, 1927 – Dec 9, 1929	Vacant		
24	David A. Reed (Pittsburgh)	Republican	Aug 8, 1922 – Jan 3, 1935	Re-elected in 1928. Lost re-election.	25	71st	24	Appointed to continue Vare's term. Lost nomination to finish Vare's term.	Dec 11, 1929 – Dec 1, 1930	Republican	Joseph R. Grundy (Bristol)	19
24	David A. Reed (Pittsburgh)	Republican	Aug 8, 1922 – Jan 3, 1935	Re-elected in 1928. Lost re-election.	25	71st	24	Elected in 1930 to finish Vare's term	Dec 2, 1930 – Jan 3, 1945	Republican	James J. Davis (Pittsburgh)	20
24	David A. Reed (Pittsburgh)	Republican	Aug 8, 1922 – Jan 3, 1935	Re-elected in 1928. Lost re-election.	25	72nd	24	Elected in 1930 to finish Vare's term	Dec 2, 1930 – Jan 3, 1945	Republican	James J. Davis (Pittsburgh)	20
24	David A. Reed (Pittsburgh)	Republican	Aug 8, 1922 – Jan 3, 1935	Re-elected in 1928. Lost re-election.	25	73rd	25	Re-elected in 1932.	Dec 2, 1930 – Jan 3, 1945	Republican	James J. Davis (Pittsburgh)	20
25	Joe Guffey (Pittsburgh)	Democratic	Jan 3, 1935 – Jan 3, 1947	Elected in 1934.	26	74th	25	Re-elected in 1932.	Dec 2, 1930 – Jan 3, 1945	Republican	James J. Davis (Pittsburgh)	20
25	Joe Guffey (Pittsburgh)	Democratic	Jan 3, 1935 – Jan 3, 1947	Elected in 1934.	26	75th	25	Re-elected in 1932.	Dec 2, 1930 – Jan 3, 1945	Republican	James J. Davis (Pittsburgh)	20
25	Joe Guffey (Pittsburgh)	Democratic	Jan 3, 1935 – Jan 3, 1947	Elected in 1934.	26	76th	26	Re-elected in 1938. Lost re-election.	Dec 2, 1930 – Jan 3, 1945	Republican	James J. Davis (Pittsburgh)	20
25	Joe Guffey (Pittsburgh)	Democratic	Jan 3, 1935 – Jan 3, 1947	Re-elected in 1940. Lost re-election.	27	77th	26	Re-elected in 1938. Lost re-election.	Dec 2, 1930 – Jan 3, 1945	Republican	James J. Davis (Pittsburgh)	20
25	Joe Guffey (Pittsburgh)	Democratic	Jan 3, 1935 – Jan 3, 1947	Re-elected in 1940. Lost re-election.	27	78th	26	Re-elected in 1938. Lost re-election.	Dec 2, 1930 – Jan 3, 1945	Republican	James J. Davis (Pittsburgh)	20
25	Joe Guffey (Pittsburgh)	Democratic	Jan 3, 1935 – Jan 3, 1947	Re-elected in 1940. Lost re-election.	27	79th	27	Elected in 1944. Lost re-election.	Jan 3, 1945 – Jan 3, 1951	Democratic	Francis Myers (Philadelphia)	21
26	Edward Martin (Washington)	Republican	Jan 3, 1947 – Jan 3, 1959	Elected in 1946.	28	80th	27	Elected in 1944. Lost re-election.	Jan 3, 1945 – Jan 3, 1951	Democratic	Francis Myers (Philadelphia)	21
26	Edward Martin (Washington)	Republican	Jan 3, 1947 – Jan 3, 1959	Elected in 1946.	28	81st	27	Elected in 1944. Lost re-election.	Jan 3, 1945 – Jan 3, 1951	Democratic	Francis Myers (Philadelphia)	21
26	Edward Martin (Washington)	Republican	Jan 3, 1947 – Jan 3, 1959	Elected in 1946.	28	82nd	28	Elected in 1950. Lost re-election.	Jan 3, 1951 – Jan 3, 1957	Republican	James H. Duff (Carnegie)	22
26	Edward Martin (Washington)	Republican	Jan 3, 1947 – Jan 3, 1959	Re-elected in 1952. Retired.	29	83rd	28	Elected in 1950. Lost re-election.	Jan 3, 1951 – Jan 3, 1957	Republican	James H. Duff (Carnegie)	22
26	Edward Martin (Washington)	Republican	Jan 3, 1947 – Jan 3, 1959	Re-elected in 1952. Retired.	29	84th	28	Elected in 1950. Lost re-election.	Jan 3, 1951 – Jan 3, 1957	Republican	James H. Duff (Carnegie)	22
26	Edward Martin (Washington)	Republican	Jan 3, 1947 – Jan 3, 1959	Re-elected in 1952. Retired.	29	85th	29	Elected in 1956.	Jan 3, 1957 – Jan 3, 1969	Democratic	Joseph S. Clark Jr. (Philadelphia)	23
27	Hugh Scott (Philadelphia)	Republican	Jan 3, 1959 – Jan 3, 1977	Elected in 1958.	30	86th	29	Elected in 1956.	Jan 3, 1957 – Jan 3, 1969	Democratic	Joseph S. Clark Jr. (Philadelphia)	23
27	Hugh Scott (Philadelphia)	Republican	Jan 3, 1959 – Jan 3, 1977	Elected in 1958.	30	87th	29	Elected in 1956.	Jan 3, 1957 – Jan 3, 1969	Democratic	Joseph S. Clark Jr. (Philadelphia)	23
27	Hugh Scott (Philadelphia)	Republican	Jan 3, 1959 – Jan 3, 1977	Elected in 1958.	30	88th	30	Re-elected in 1962. Lost re-election.	Jan 3, 1957 – Jan 3, 1969	Democratic	Joseph S. Clark Jr. (Philadelphia)	23
27	Hugh Scott (Philadelphia)	Republican	Jan 3, 1959 – Jan 3, 1977	Re-elected in 1964.	31	89th	30	Re-elected in 1962. Lost re-election.	Jan 3, 1957 – Jan 3, 1969	Democratic	Joseph S. Clark Jr. (Philadelphia)	23
27	Hugh Scott (Philadelphia)	Republican	Jan 3, 1959 – Jan 3, 1977	Re-elected in 1964.	31	90th	30	Re-elected in 1962. Lost re-election.	Jan 3, 1957 – Jan 3, 1969	Democratic	Joseph S. Clark Jr. (Philadelphia)	23
27	Hugh Scott (Philadelphia)	Republican	Jan 3, 1959 – Jan 3, 1977	Re-elected in 1964.	31	91st	31	Elected in 1968.	Jan 3, 1969 – Jan 3, 1981	Republican	Richard Schweiker (Worcester)	24
27	Hugh Scott (Philadelphia)	Republican	Jan 3, 1959 – Jan 3, 1977	Re-elected in 1970. Retired.	32	92nd	31	Elected in 1968.	Jan 3, 1969 – Jan 3, 1981	Republican	Richard Schweiker (Worcester)	24
27	Hugh Scott (Philadelphia)	Republican	Jan 3, 1959 – Jan 3, 1977	Re-elected in 1970. Retired.	32	93rd	31	Elected in 1968.	Jan 3, 1969 – Jan 3, 1981	Republican	Richard Schweiker (Worcester)	24
27	Hugh Scott (Philadelphia)	Republican	Jan 3, 1959 – Jan 3, 1977	Re-elected in 1970. Retired.	32	94th	32	Re-elected in 1974. Retired.	Jan 3, 1969 – Jan 3, 1981	Republican	Richard Schweiker (Worcester)	24
28	John Heinz (Pittsburgh)	Republican	Jan 3, 1977 – Apr 4, 1991	Elected in 1976.	33	95th	32	Re-elected in 1974. Retired.	Jan 3, 1969 – Jan 3, 1981	Republican	Richard Schweiker (Worcester)	24
28	John Heinz (Pittsburgh)	Republican	Jan 3, 1977 – Apr 4, 1991	Elected in 1976.	33	96th	32	Re-elected in 1974. Retired.	Jan 3, 1969 – Jan 3, 1981	Republican	Richard Schweiker (Worcester)	24
28	John Heinz (Pittsburgh)	Republican	Jan 3, 1977 – Apr 4, 1991	Elected in 1976.	33	97th	33	Elected in 1980.	Jan 3, 1981 – Jan 3, 2011	Republican	Arlen Specter (Philadelphia)	25
28	John Heinz (Pittsburgh)	Republican	Jan 3, 1977 – Apr 4, 1991	Re-elected in 1982.	34	98th	33	Elected in 1980.	Jan 3, 1981 – Jan 3, 2011	Republican	Arlen Specter (Philadelphia)	25
28	John Heinz (Pittsburgh)	Republican	Jan 3, 1977 – Apr 4, 1991	Re-elected in 1982.	34	99th	33	Elected in 1980.	Jan 3, 1981 – Jan 3, 2011	Republican	Arlen Specter (Philadelphia)	25
28	John Heinz (Pittsburgh)	Republican	Jan 3, 1977 – Apr 4, 1991	Re-elected in 1982.	34	100th	34	Re-elected in 1986.	Jan 3, 1981 – Jan 3, 2011	Republican	Arlen Specter (Philadelphia)	25
28	John Heinz (Pittsburgh)	Republican	Jan 3, 1977 – Apr 4, 1991	Re-elected in 1988. Died.	35	101st	34	Re-elected in 1986.	Jan 3, 1981 – Jan 3, 2011	Republican	Arlen Specter (Philadelphia)	25
28	John Heinz (Pittsburgh)	Republican	Jan 3, 1977 – Apr 4, 1991	Re-elected in 1988. Died.	35	102nd	34	Re-elected in 1986.	Jan 3, 1981 – Jan 3, 2011	Republican	Arlen Specter (Philadelphia)	25
Vacant			Apr 4, 1991 – May 9, 1991		35	102nd	34	Re-elected in 1986.	Jan 3, 1981 – Jan 3, 2011	Republican	Arlen Specter (Philadelphia)	25
29	Harris Wofford (Bryn Mawr)	Democratic	May 9, 1991 – Jan 3, 1995	Appointed to continue Heinz's term. Elected to finish Heinz's term. Lost re-election.	35	102nd	34	Re-elected in 1986.	Jan 3, 1981 – Jan 3, 2011	Republican	Arlen Specter (Philadelphia)	25
29	Harris Wofford (Bryn Mawr)	Democratic	May 9, 1991 – Jan 3, 1995	Appointed to continue Heinz's term. Elected to finish Heinz's term. Lost re-election.	35	103rd	35	Re-elected in 1992.	Jan 3, 1981 – Jan 3, 2011	Republican	Arlen Specter (Philadelphia)	25
30	Rick Santorum (Penn Hills)	Republican	Jan 3, 1995 – Jan 3, 2007	Elected in 1994.	36	104th	35	Re-elected in 1992.	Jan 3, 1981 – Jan 3, 2011	Republican	Arlen Specter (Philadelphia)	25
30	Rick Santorum (Penn Hills)	Republican	Jan 3, 1995 – Jan 3, 2007	Elected in 1994.	36	105th	35	Re-elected in 1992.	Jan 3, 1981 – Jan 3, 2011	Republican	Arlen Specter (Philadelphia)	25
30	Rick Santorum (Penn Hills)	Republican	Jan 3, 1995 – Jan 3, 2007	Elected in 1994.	36	106th	36	Re-elected in 1998.	Jan 3, 1981 – Jan 3, 2011	Republican	Arlen Specter (Philadelphia)	25
30	Rick Santorum (Penn Hills)	Republican	Jan 3, 1995 – Jan 3, 2007	Re-elected in 2000. Lost re-election.	37	107th	36	Re-elected in 1998.	Jan 3, 1981 – Jan 3, 2011	Republican	Arlen Specter (Philadelphia)	25
30	Rick Santorum (Penn Hills)	Republican	Jan 3, 1995 – Jan 3, 2007	Re-elected in 2000. Lost re-election.	37	108th	36	Re-elected in 1998.	Jan 3, 1981 – Jan 3, 2011	Republican	Arlen Specter (Philadelphia)	25
30	Rick Santorum (Penn Hills)	Republican	Jan 3, 1995 – Jan 3, 2007	Re-elected in 2000. Lost re-election.	37	109th	37	Re-elected in 2004. Changed party on Apr 28, 2009. Lost renomination.	Jan 3, 1981 – Jan 3, 2011	Republican	Arlen Specter (Philadelphia)	25
31	Bob Casey Jr. (Scranton)	Democratic	Jan 3, 2007 – Jan 3, 2025	Elected in 2006.	38	110th	37	Re-elected in 2004. Changed party on Apr 28, 2009. Lost renomination.	Jan 3, 1981 – Jan 3, 2011	Republican	Arlen Specter (Philadelphia)	25
31	Bob Casey Jr. (Scranton)	Democratic	Jan 3, 2007 – Jan 3, 2025	Elected in 2006.	38	111th	37	Re-elected in 2004. Changed party on Apr 28, 2009. Lost renomination.	Jan 3, 1981 – Jan 3, 2011	Republican	Arlen Specter (Philadelphia)	25
31	Bob Casey Jr. (Scranton)	Democratic	Jan 3, 2007 – Jan 3, 2025	Elected in 2006.	38	111th	37	Re-elected in 2004. Changed party on Apr 28, 2009. Lost renomination.	Jan 3, 1981 – Jan 3, 2011	Democratic	Arlen Specter (Philadelphia)	25
31	Bob Casey Jr. (Scranton)	Democratic	Jan 3, 2007 – Jan 3, 2025	Elected in 2006.	38	112th	38	Elected in 2010.	Jan 3, 2011 – Jan 3, 2023	Republican	Pat Toomey (Zionsville)	26
31	Bob Casey Jr. (Scranton)	Democratic	Jan 3, 2007 – Jan 3, 2025	Re-elected in 2012.	39	113th	38	Elected in 2010.	Jan 3, 2011 – Jan 3, 2023	Republican	Pat Toomey (Zionsville)	26
31	Bob Casey Jr. (Scranton)	Democratic	Jan 3, 2007 – Jan 3, 2025	Re-elected in 2012.	39	114th	38	Elected in 2010.	Jan 3, 2011 – Jan 3, 2023	Republican	Pat Toomey (Zionsville)	26
31	Bob Casey Jr. (Scranton)	Democratic	Jan 3, 2007 – Jan 3, 2025	Re-elected in 2012.	39	115th	39	Re-elected in 2016. Retired.	Jan 3, 2011 – Jan 3, 2023	Republican	Pat Toomey (Zionsville)	26
31	Bob Casey Jr. (Scranton)	Democratic	Jan 3, 2007 – Jan 3, 2025	Re-elected in 2018. Lost re-election.	40	116th	39	Re-elected in 2016. Retired.	Jan 3, 2011 – Jan 3, 2023	Republican	Pat Toomey (Zionsville)	26
31	Bob Casey Jr. (Scranton)	Democratic	Jan 3, 2007 – Jan 3, 2025	Re-elected in 2018. Lost re-election.	40	117th	39	Re-elected in 2016. Retired.	Jan 3, 2011 – Jan 3, 2023	Republican	Pat Toomey (Zionsville)	26
31	Bob Casey Jr. (Scranton)	Democratic	Jan 3, 2007 – Jan 3, 2025	Re-elected in 2018. Lost re-election.	40	118th	40	Elected in 2022.	Jan 3, 2023 – present	Democratic	John Fetterman (Braddock)	27
32	Dave McCormick (Pittsburgh)	Republican	Jan 3, 2025 – present	Elected in 2024.	41	119th	40	Elected in 2022.	Jan 3, 2023 – present	Democratic	John Fetterman (Braddock)	27
32	Dave McCormick (Pittsburgh)	Republican	Jan 3, 2025 – present	Elected in 2024.	41	120th	40	Elected in 2022.	Jan 3, 2023 – present	Democratic	John Fetterman (Braddock)	27
32	Dave McCormick (Pittsburgh)	Republican	Jan 3, 2025 – present	Elected in 2024.	41	121st	41	To be determined in the 2028 election.				
To be determined in the 2030 election.					42	122nd	41	To be determined in the 2028 election.				

== See also ==
- List of United States representatives from Pennsylvania
- List of United States Senate elections in Pennsylvania
- Pennsylvania's congressional delegations
