= 1928 United States Senate election in Pennsylvania =

- November 6, 1928
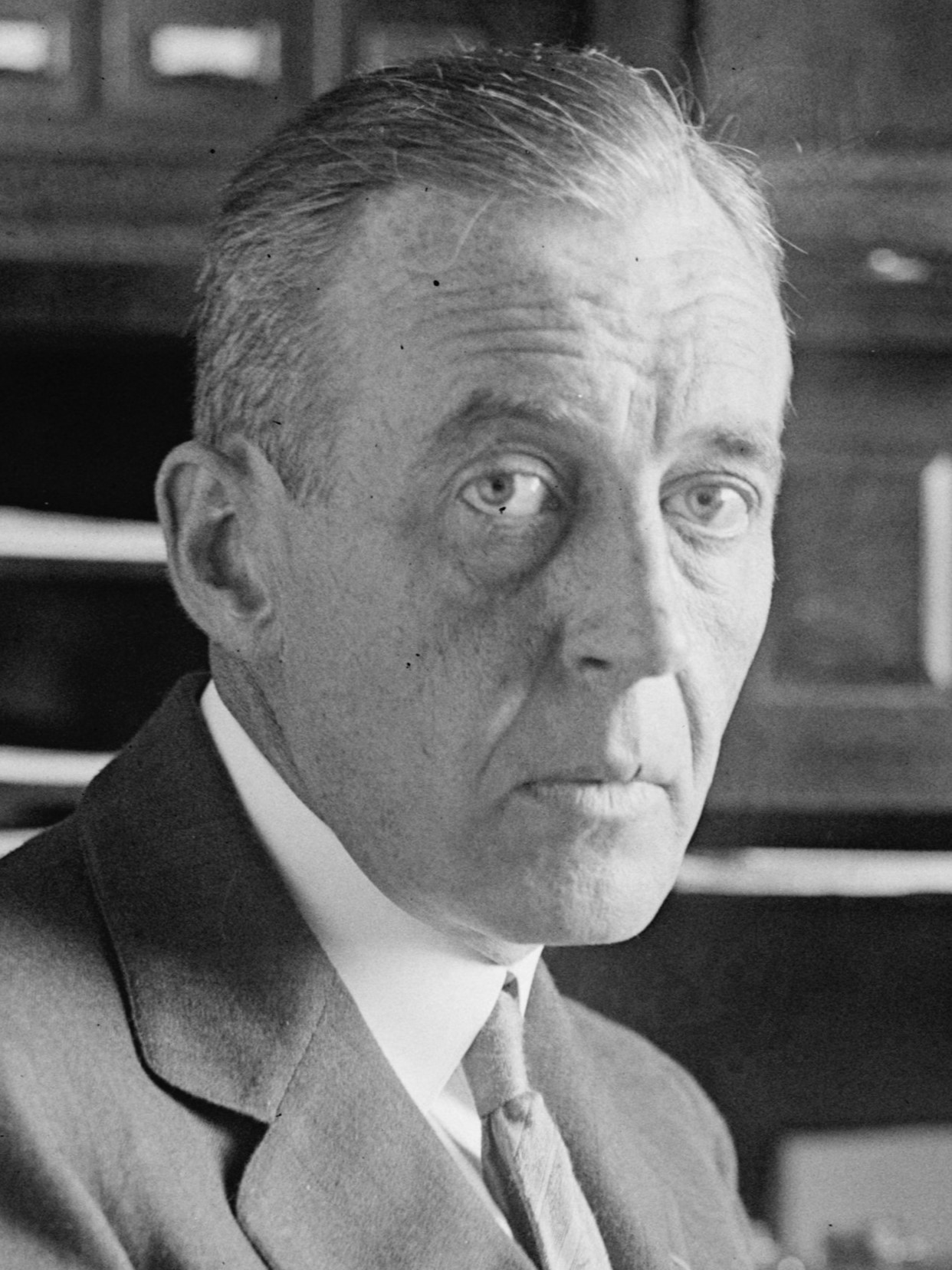

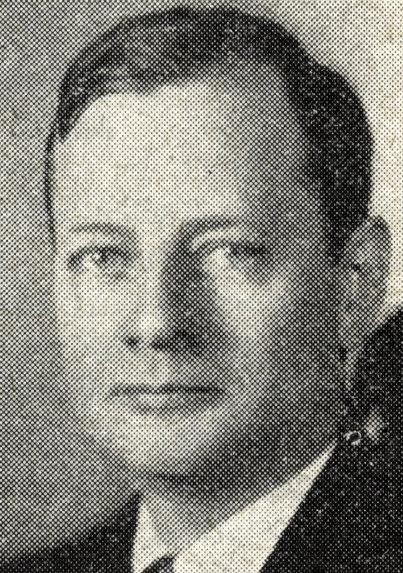
Nominee	David A. Reed	William N. McNair
Party	Republican	Democratic
Popular vote	1,948,646	1,029,055
Percentage	64.38%	34.00%
- County results Reed: 50–60% 60–70% 70–80% 80–90% McNair: 50–60%
U.S. senator before election
David A. Reed
Republican
Elected U.S. Senator
David A. Reed
Republican

The 1928 United States Senate election in Pennsylvania was held on November 6, 1928. Incumbent Republican U.S. Senator David A. Reed successfully sought re-election to another term, defeating Democratic nominee William N. McNair.

== General election ==
=== Candidates ===
- Elisha K. Kane (Prohibition)
- Charles Kutz (Socialist Labor)
- William N. McNair, Pittsburgh attorney (Democratic)
- David A. Reed, incumbent U.S. Senator (Republican)
- William H. Thomas (Socialist Labor)
- William J. Van Essen (Socialist)
- W. J. White (Workers)

=== Results ===
General election results
Party	Candidate	Votes	%	±%
Republican	David A. Reed (inc.)	1,948,646	64.38%	▲8.77
Democratic	William N. McNair	1,029,055	34.00%	▲3.87
Socialist	William J. Van Essen	23,100	0.76%	▼1.53
Prohibition	Elisha K. Kane	14,866	0.49%	▼2.42
Socialist Labor	Charles Kutz	7,524	0.25%	N/A
Workers	W. J. White	2,420	0.08%	N/A
Socialist Labor	William H. Thomas	1,234	0.04%	N/A
N/A	Other	19	0.00%	N/A
Total votes		3,026,864	100.00%	
