= Joseph F. Guffey =

American politician

Joe Guffey
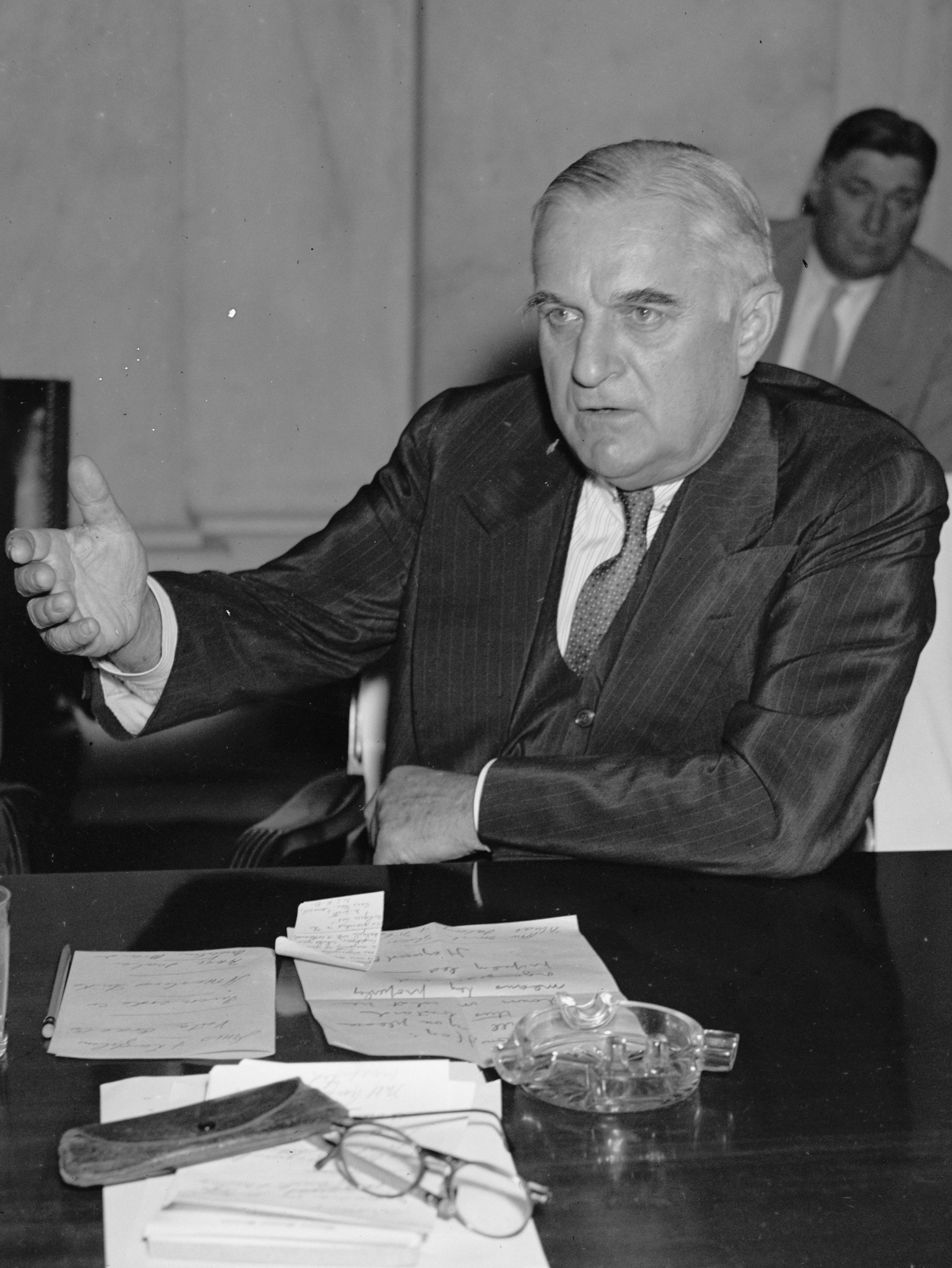
- Guffey in 1937

United States Senator from Pennsylvania
- In office January 3, 1935 – January 3, 1947
- Preceded by: David Reed
- Succeeded by: Edward Martin

Member of the Democratic National Committee from Pennsylvania
- In office May 18, 1920 – May 20, 1928
- Preceded by: A. Mitchell Palmer
- Succeeded by: Sedgwick Kistler

Personal details
- Born: December 29, 1870 Sewickley Township, Pennsylvania, U.S.
- Died: March 6, 1959 (aged 88) Washington, D.C., U.S.
- Party: Democratic
- Relations: Emma Guffey Miller (sister)

Joseph Finch Guffey (December 29, 1870 – March 6, 1959) was an American business executive and Democratic Party politician from Pittsburgh, Pennsylvania. Elected from Pennsylvania to the United States Senate, he served two terms, from 1935 until 1947.

== Early life ==
Joseph Finch Guffey was born on December 29, 1870, at Guffey Station in Sewickley Township, Pennsylvania, to John and Barbaretta (Hough) Guffey. Guffey's Scots-Irish ancestors had owned land along the Youghiogheny River since the 1780s, and prospered when railroads were constructed there. His mother was of English ancestry (Hough is a common surname in Lancashire.) Joseph Guffey was the last born of eight children: brothers James C. and Alexander S, and sisters Ida Virginia, Pauletta, Mary Emma, Jane Campbell, and Elizabet Irwin.

He attended but did not graduate from Princeton University. As a Princeton student, he became a disciple of Professor Woodrow Wilson. During Wilson's tenure as Princeton president, Guffey and other former students became supporters of Wilson's Quad Plan for developing the university. Later Guffey became active in the Democratic Party and worked to help Wilson secure the Democratic presidential nomination in 1912 and gain election.

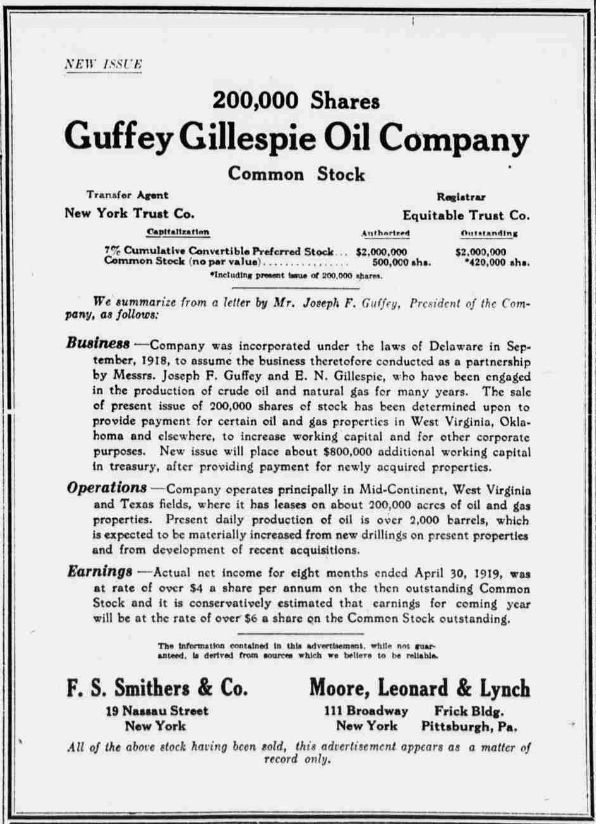
Guffey Gillespie Oil Company ad published in The Sun, July 21, 1919

In 1901–1918, Guffy was a general manager of the Philadelphia Company in Pittsburgh, a public utilities company, taking part in some other business enterprises. In September 1918, he incorporated a new firm, Guffey Gillespie Oil Company with E. N. Gillespie. It leased 220,000 acres in the Mid-Continent and Texas oil fields and was valued around $3,500,000 in 1921.

== World War I ==
After the United States joined its allies in the World War I, Guffey entered the government service and was appointed a member of the War Industries Board (Petroleum Service Division), as well as the director of the Bureau of Sales in the Office of Alien Property Custodian. He served until March 1921, receiving one-dollar salary in compensation, while handling, according to The New York Times, sums in excess of $50,000,000. On December 28, 1922, he was indicted by a federal grand jury on twelve counts of embezzlement through misappropriation of funds that he managed during his service as director of the Bureau of Sales. George W. Storck, the Justice Department accountant, claimed that Guffey allegedly mishandled interest generated by the deposits of government funds in thirty-two banks while obtaining personal loans from the same banks. It was known that Guffey suffered financial setbacks in Mexico in his oil speculation during World War I. In 1926, Guffey was named in another federal indictment involving alleged undervaluation of property and collusion of interest in bidding regarding the sale of the Bosch Magneto Company taken over by Alien Property Custodian as an enemy-owned asset.

Joseph Patrick Tumulty, former president Wilson's personal secretary and Guffey's attorney, asserted that all allegations against his client were politically motivated. His defense was that Guffy did not withhold the accrued interest in the sum of approximately $400,000, but merely was holding it until his retirement from the office. After Guffey settled in full his account at the Bureau of Sales, the charges against him were dropped. It became a part of a settlement of dubious deals made during the Harding/Coolidge administrations including Teapot Dome scandal.

== United States Senate ==
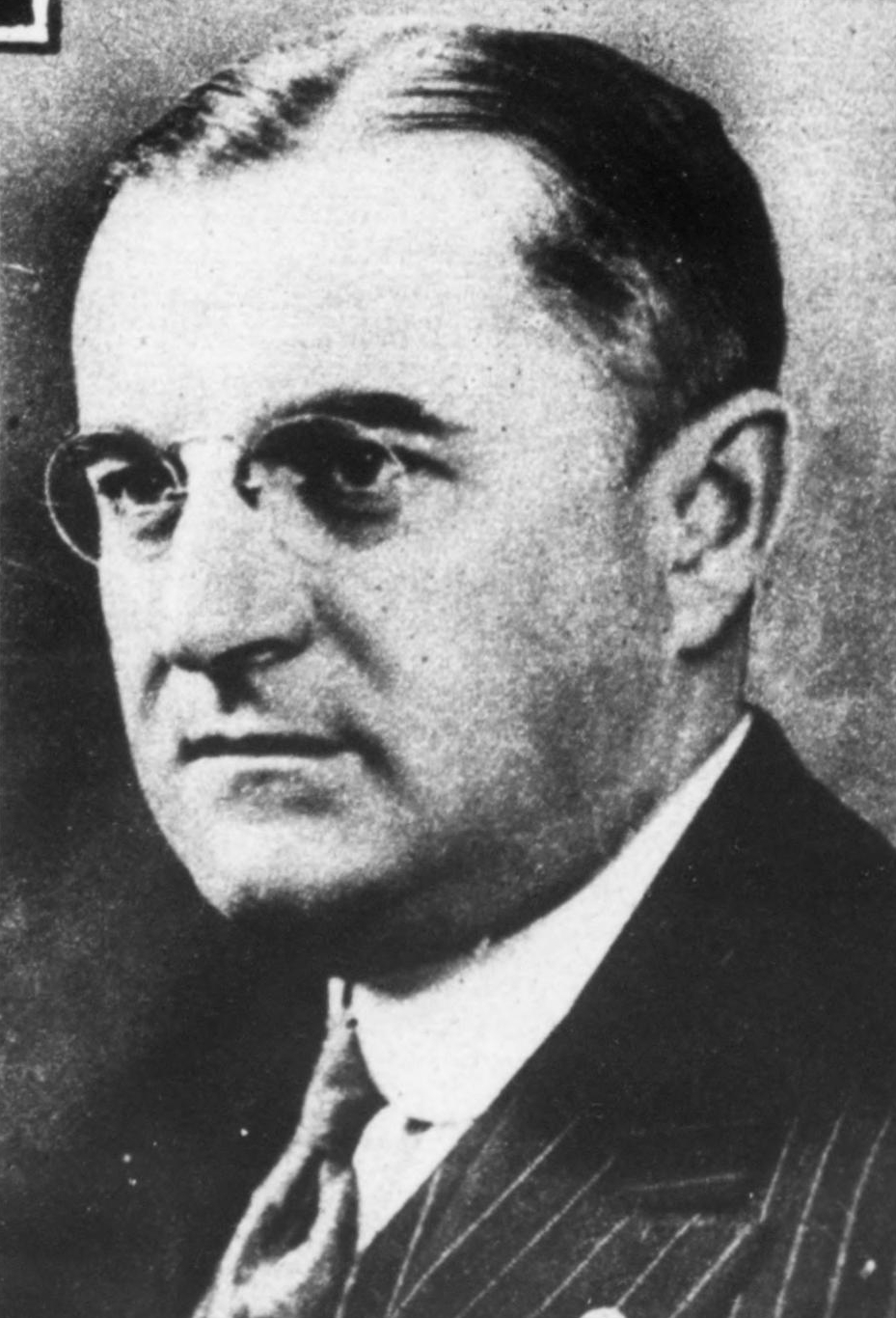
Guffey as National Committeeman from Pennsylvania c. 1924

Guffey served as a member of the Democratic National Committee from 1920 through 1928. He and his lieutenant, David L. Lawrence led a resurgence of the Pennsylvania Democratic Party. Guffey was elected to the United States Senate in 1934, unseating Republican Senator David Reed. Guffey became the first Democrat to win election as Senator from Pennsylvania since William A. Wallace won election in 1874. In that same year, George H. Earle became the first Democratic Governor of Pennsylvania since the 19th century.

He was the chairperson of the Mines and Mining committee, and was a fervent supporter of the President Franklin D. Roosevelt's New Deal in the 1930s and later on. He supported the politics of Henry Wallace, who compared the Republicans with fascists.

Guffey spoke out against Harry Anslinger (who had been appointed to lead the newly formed Federal Bureau of Narcotics by his father-in-law Andrew Mellon) for referring to "niggers" in official correspondence. He caused a controversy in Pennsylvania when he backed Lieutenant Governor Thomas Kennedy, who was a close associate of mine workers union head John L. Lewis, over lawyer Charles Alvin Jones who was backed by Governor Earle and other Democratic leaders. Jones later lost the general election to Republican Arthur James. Guffey was at the same time working with Lewis, demanding that Pleas E. Greenlee replace Charles F. Hosford Jr. who had been ineffective as chairman of the National Bituminous Coal Commission.

He became involved in the so-called "publishers' war" of 1938 and was sued for libel and slander by Moses Annenberg, owner of The Philadelphia Inquirer, after Guffey in October 1938 declared on radio that Annenberg planned to "buy the governorship of Pennsylvania for his hand-picked candidate," namely Arthur H. James.

He was reelected in 1940, with Claude Pepper campaigning with him. Guffey was less influential after the Republicans took control of the Congress and reversed some of the laws helping labor unions, eventually passing the Taft-Hartley Act after Guffey was defeated by Governor Edward Martin by a wide margin in 1946.

In April 1943, British scholar Isaiah Berlin wrote a confidential analysis of the Senate Foreign Relations Committee for the British Foreign Office, and characterized Guffey as:

... a noisy Administration supporter who wraps himself in the Roosevelt flag and has been advocating for a fourth term for some time. A very typical Pennsylvania politician who has decided to throw his lot in with the President and has thus become an obedient party hack not of the purest integrity. Consistently votes in the opposite direction to his fellow Senator from Pennsylvania, James Davis.

== Retirement ==
After leaving the Senate, Guffey retired to Washington, D.C., where he died in 1959. Upon his death, his remains were returned to West Newton, Pennsylvania for burial in the West Newton Cemetery.

Joseph Guffey papers are preserved at Washington & Jefferson College in Washington, Pennsylvania, Princeton University Library, in Princeton, New Jersey, Claude Pepper Center at Florida State University Library (text of campaign speech given March 11, 1940), and National Archives at College Park in Maryland

== See also ==
- Guffey Coal Act

U.S. Senate
| Preceded by David Reed | U.S. senator (Class 1) from Pennsylvania; 1935–1947; Served alongside: James Davis, Francis Myers | Succeeded by Edward Martin |
Party political offices
| Preceded by A. Mitchell Palmer | Member of the Democratic National Committee from Pennsylvania; 1920–1928 | Succeeded by Sedgwick Kistler |
| Preceded by William McNair | Democratic nominee for U.S. Senator from Pennsylvania (Class 1); 1934, 1940, 1946 | Succeeded by Guy Bard |
