= David A. Reed =

American senator from Pennsylvania (1880–1953)

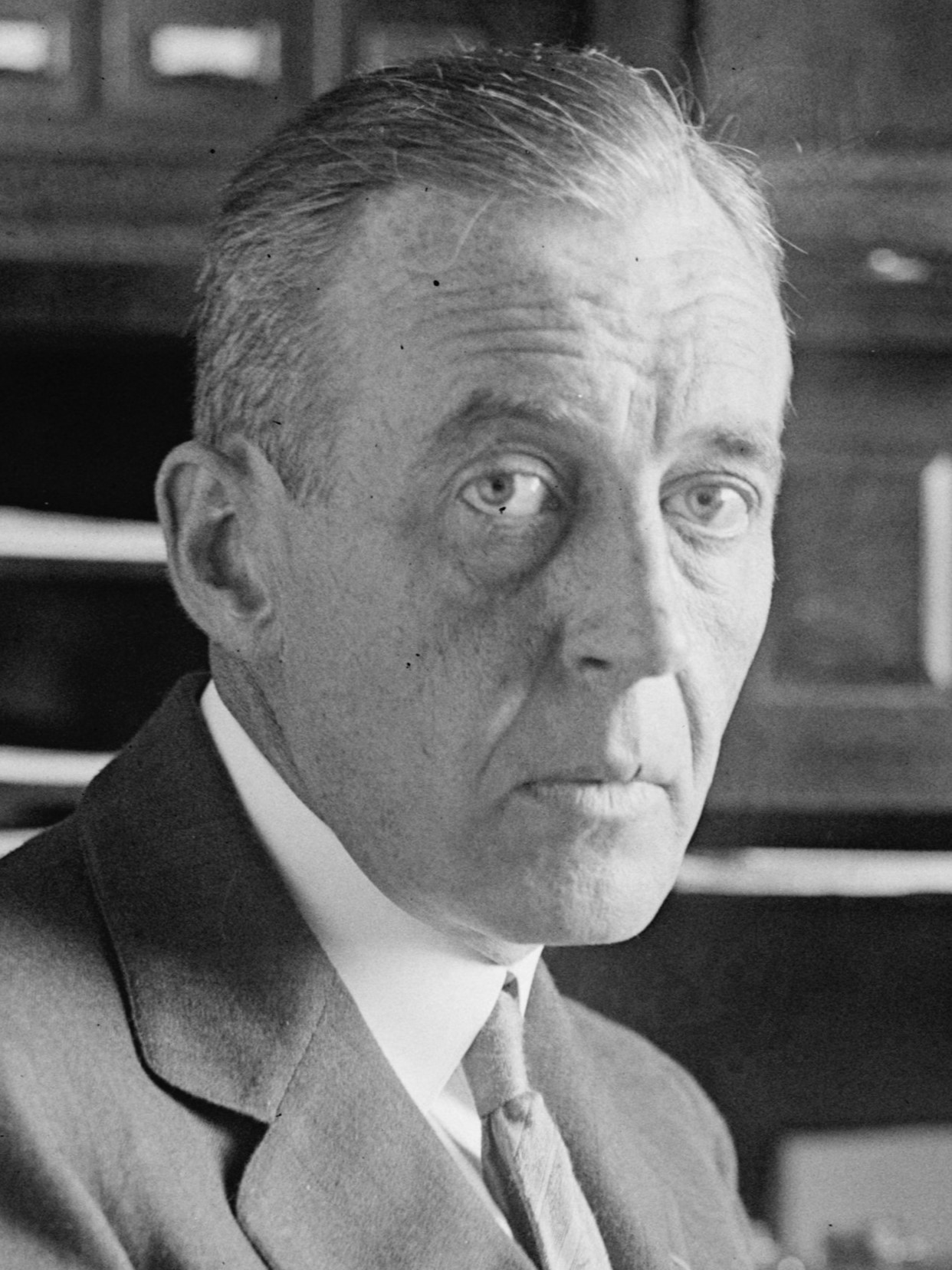
- Reed in 1922

United States Senator from Pennsylvania
- In office August 8, 1922 – January 3, 1935
- Preceded by: William E. Crow
- Succeeded by: Joseph F. Guffey

Personal details
- Born: David Aiken Reed; December 21, 1880 Pittsburgh, Pennsylvania, US
- Died: February 10, 1953 (aged 72) Sarasota, Florida, US
- Party: Republican
- Spouse(s): Adele Mary Wilcox (m. 1902); Edna M. French (m. 1948)
- Education: Princeton University (A.B.); University of Pittsburgh (LL.B.)

Military service
- Allegiance: United States of America
- Branch/service: United States Army
- Years of service: 1917–1919
- Rank: Major
- Unit: United States Army
- Battles/wars: World War I

David Aiken Reed (December 21, 1880 – February 10, 1953) was an American lawyer and Republican party politician from Pittsburgh, Pennsylvania. He represented Pennsylvania in the United States Senate from 1922 to 1935.

He was a co-author of the restrictive Immigration Act of 1924, also known as the Johnson–Reed Act.

== Early life and education ==
David Aiken Reed was born on December 21, 1880, in Pittsburgh, Pennsylvania to James Hay Reed, a Pittsburgh lawyer and federal judge, and Katherine Jones (Aiken) Reed. He graduated from Shady Side Academy, a Pittsburgh prep school, in 1896.

He then obtained his college education at Princeton University, from which he graduated with a Bachelor of Arts degree in 1900. He earned a Bachelor of Laws from the University of Pittsburgh Law School in 1903 and was admitted to the bar during the same year.

== Legal career and military service ==
He practiced law from 1903 to 1917 in Pittsburgh, also serving as chairman of the Pennsylvania Industrial Accidents Commission, until serving as a major in field artillery in World War I until 1919, after which he resumed practicing law. In the military he received the Victory Medal, The Distinguished Service Medal and the France Order Legion Honor Knight Cross. He also was the post commander for VFW East Liberty Post number 5 Department of Pennsylvania. His dog tag reads "David A. Reed Major 311th Field Artillery U.S.A."

== United States Senate ==
Reed, a Republican, was appointed to the United States Senate on August 8, 1922, to fill a vacancy created by the death of William E. Crow. He was subsequently elected on November 7, 1922, to serve for the remainder of Crow's term and a six-year term in his own right, beginning in March 1923.

Along with Congressman Albert Johnson, Senator Reed was a co-author of the Immigration Act of 1924, the purpose of which was to restrict the movement of Eastern and Southern Europeans into the United States, and prohibit Asian immigration in its entirety.

On April 27, 1924, The New York Times published Reed's explanation of the Immigration Act of 1924: "Until the years 1853-85 the sources from which the greater number of our immigrants came were the same sources from which our country was originally colonized, and as a result of this fact the immigrants were easily assimilated in our population upon their arrival here. Beginning about 1885, new types of people began to come. For the first time in our history men began to come in large numbers from Italy, Greece, Poland, Turkey in Europe, the Balkan States and from Russia. As these new sources of immigration began to pour out their masses of humanity upon our shores the old sources in Northwestern Europe seemed to dry up, and whereas in 1890 the natives of Southern and Eastern Europe constituted about 8 percent of our foreign-born population, in 1910 they constituted 39 per cent. This change brought new difficulties in the problem of assimilation. These new peoples spoke strange languages. It was not to be expected that they would readily fuse into the population that they found here."

Reed served as chairman of the Committee on Expenditures in Executive Departments and Committee on Military Affairs. He was reelected in 1928, but was unsuccessful in seeking reelection in 1934. Frustrated with Congressional inaction in response to the Great Depression, in a July 1, 1932, Senate speech, Reed said: “I do not often envy other countries and their governments, but I say that if this country ever needed a Mussolini, it needs one now.” He was also a Member of the American Liberty League. His tenure in the U.S. Senate ended with the expiration of his term on January 3, 1935.

== After the Senate ==
After serving in the U.S. Senate, Reed resumed practicing law in Pittsburgh until his death on February 10, 1953, in Sarasota, Florida. He was interred in Arlington National Cemetery in Arlington, Virginia.

His house on 2222 S Street NW in the Kalorama neighborhood of Washington, D.C., designed by Carrere & Hastings and built in 1929, survives as the Embassy of Laos.

U.S. Senate
Preceded by William Crow	U.S. senator (Class 1) from Pennsylvania; 1922–1935; Served alongside: George Pepper, William Vare,^{1} Joe Grundy, James Davis	Succeeded by Joe Guffey
Party political offices
Preceded by Philander Knox	Republican nominee for U.S. Senator from Pennsylvania (Class 1); 1922, 1928, 1934	Succeeded by Jay Cooke
Notes and references
1. Vare was never sworn-in or seated.
