= 1946 United States Senate election in Pennsylvania =

- November 5, 1946
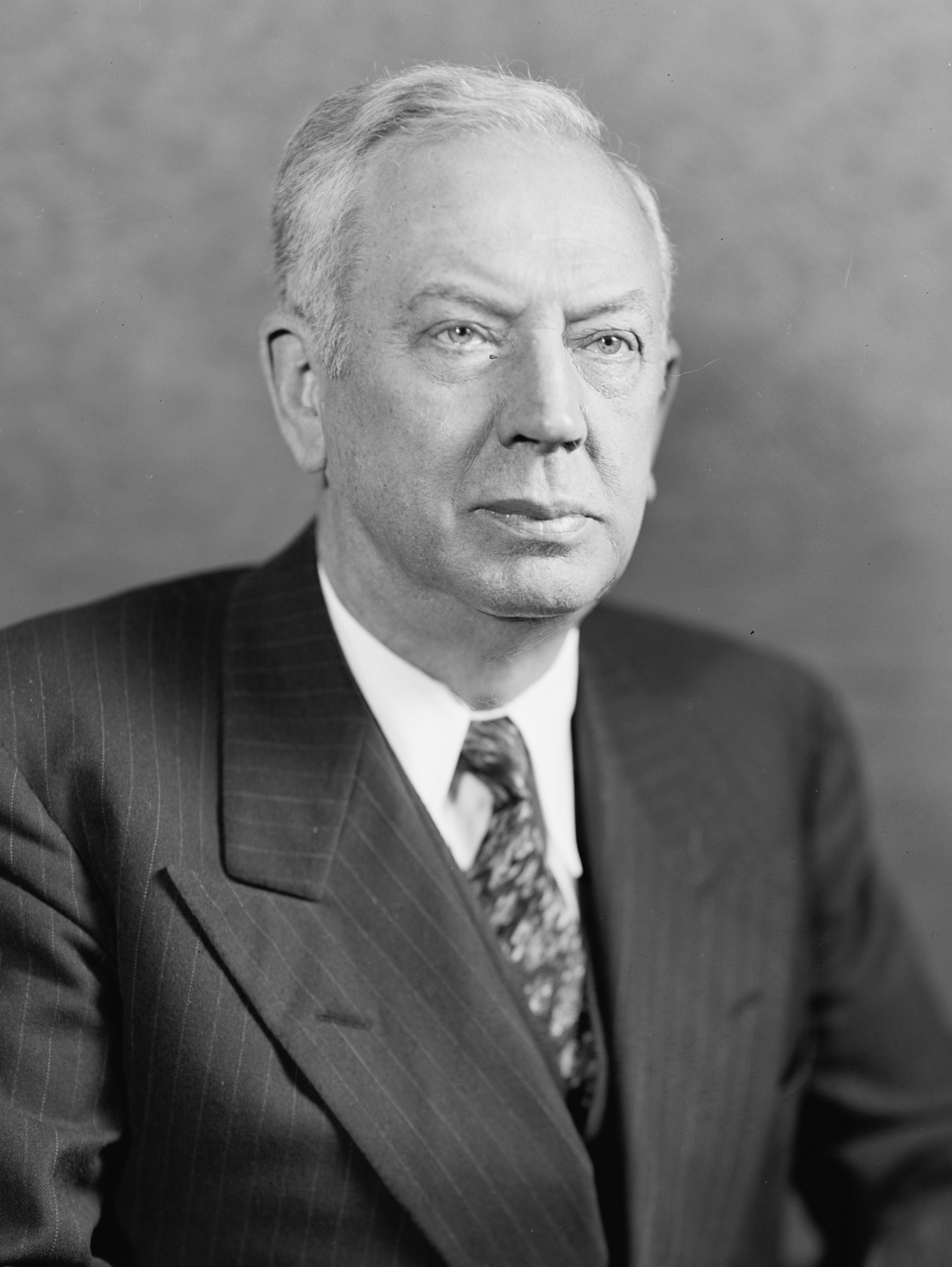

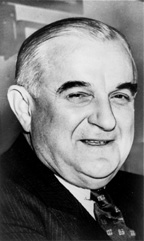
Nominee	Edward Martin	Joseph F. Guffey
Party	Republican	Democratic
Popular vote	1,853,458	1,245,338
Percentage	59.26%	39.81%
- County results Cooke: 40–50% 50–60% 60–70% 70–80% 80–90% Guffey: 40–50% 50–60%
U.S. senator before election
Joseph F. Guffey
Democratic
Elected U.S. Senator
Edward Martin
Republican

The 1946 United States Senate election in Pennsylvania was held on November 5, 1946. Incumbent Democratic U.S. Senator Joseph F. Guffey sought re-election to another term, but was defeated by Republican nominee Edward Martin. This was the last time that the Republican candidate won Philadelphia in an election for the Class 1 Senate seat.

== General election ==
=== Candidates ===
- Joseph F. Guffey, incumbent U.S. Senator (Democratic)
- Frank Knotek (Socialist Labor)
- Dale H. Learn, East Stroudsburg real estate agent (Prohibition)
- Edward Martin, Governor of Pennsylvania (Republican)

=== Results ===
General election results
Party	Candidate	Votes	%	±%
Republican	Edward Martin	1,853,458	59.26%	▲11.90
Democratic	Joseph F. Guffey (inc.)	1,245,338	39.81%	▼11.98
Prohibition	Dale H. Learn	17,451	0.56%	▲0.28
Socialist Labor	Frank Knotek	11,613	0.37%	▲0.31
Totals		3,127,860	100.00%	
