= 1920 United States Senate election in Pennsylvania =

- November 2, 1920
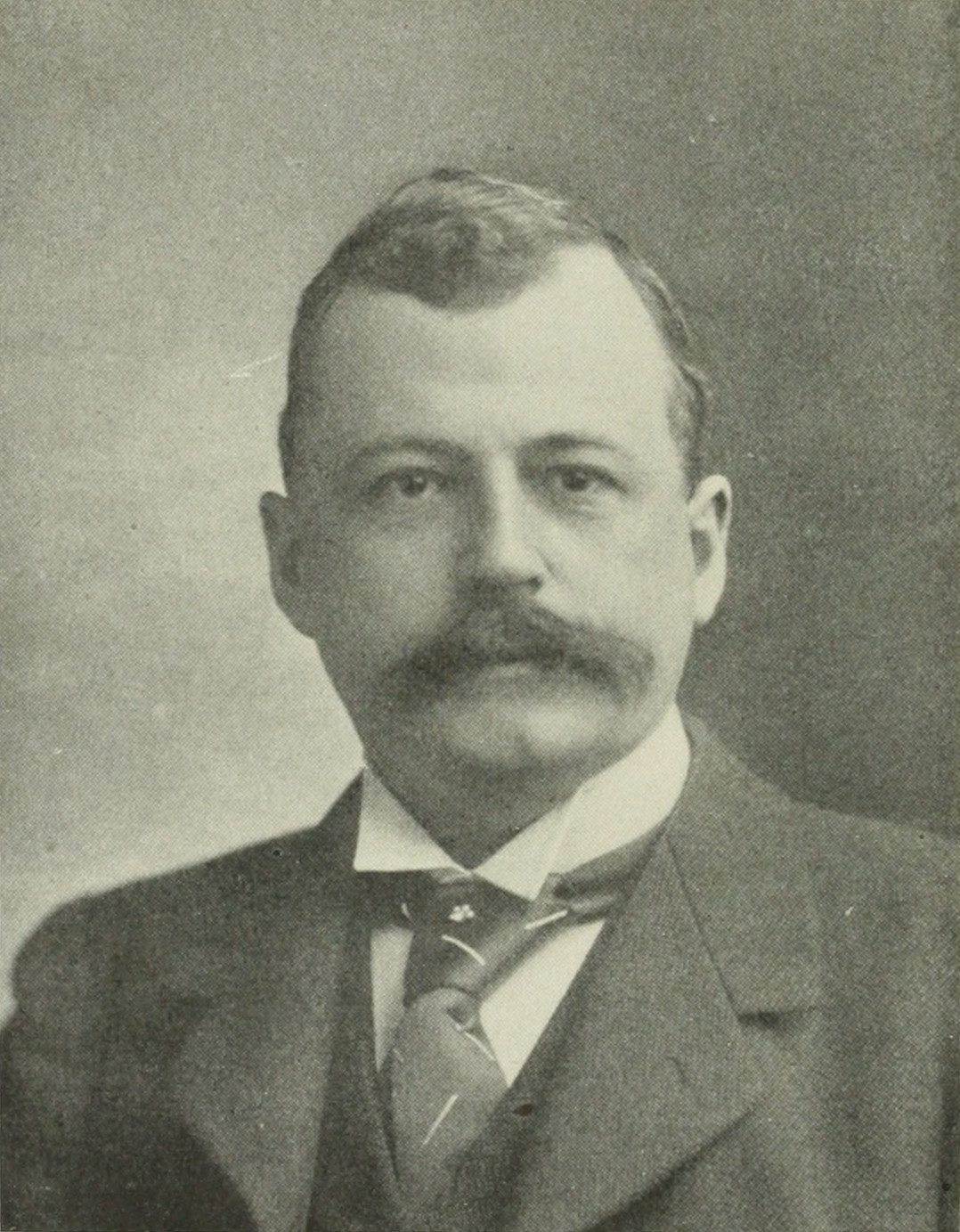

Nominee	Boies Penrose	John A. Farrell	Leah C. Marion
Party	Republican	Democratic	Prohibition
Popular vote	1,067,989	484,362	132,610
Percentage	59.94%	27.18%	7.44%
- County results Penrose: 40–50% 50–60% 60–70% 70–80% Farrell: 40–50% 50–60%
U.S. senator before election
Boies Penrose
Republican
Elected U.S. Senator
Boies Penrose
Republican

The 1920 United States Senate election in Pennsylvania was held on November 2, 1920. Incumbent Republican U.S. Senator Boies Penrose successfully sought re-election to another term, defeating Democratic nominee John A. Farrell.

== General election ==
=== Candidates ===
- John A. Farrell, West Chester physician (Democratic)
- Joseph E. Jennings (Single Tax)
- Leah C. Marion, treasurer of the Women's Christian Temperance Union (Prohibition)
- Boies Penrose, incumbent U.S. Senator (Republican)
- Robert J. Wheeler (Labor)
- Birch Wilson, editor of the Reading Labor Advocate (Socialist)

=== Results ===
General election results
Party	Candidate	Votes	%	±%
Republican	Boies Penrose (incumbent)	1,067,989	59.94%	▲13.18
Democratic	John A. Farrell	484,362	27.18%	▲2.31
Prohibition	Leah C. Marion	132,610	7.44%	▲5.86
Socialist	Birch Wilson	67,316	3.78%	▲0.37
Labor	Robert J. Wheeler	27,401	1.54%	N/A
Single Tax	Joseph E. Jennings	2,110	0.12%	N/A
N/A	Others	55	0.00%	
