= William E. Crow =

American politician

William Evans Crow
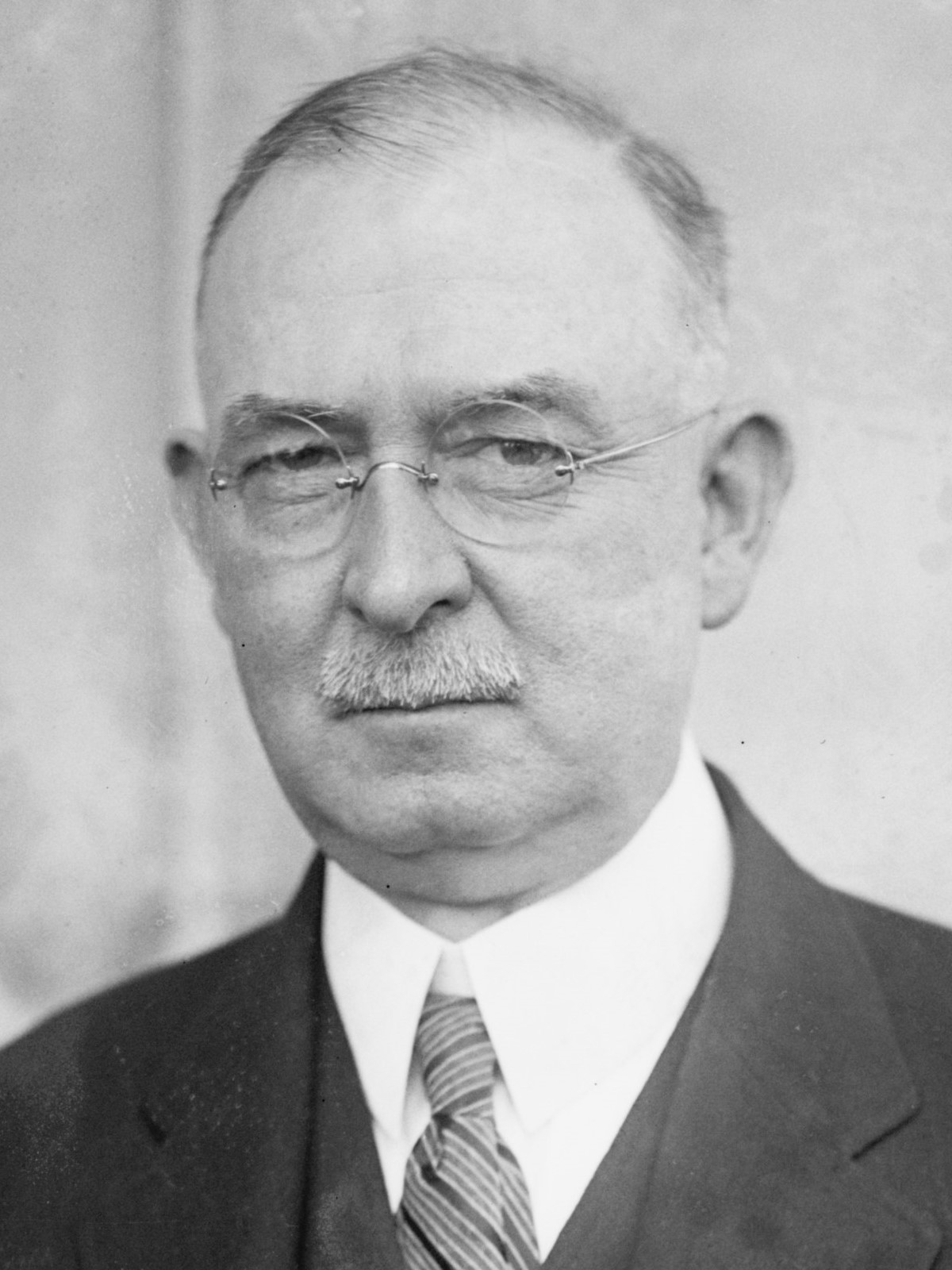
- Crow in 1921

United States Senator from Pennsylvania
- In office October 24, 1921 – August 2, 1922
- Appointed by: William Cameron Sproul
- Preceded by: Philander Knox
- Succeeded by: David Reed

President pro tempore of the Pennsylvania Senate
- In office January 3, 1911 – May 25, 1911
- Preceded by: A.E. Sisson
- Succeeded by: George Wertz

Member of the Pennsylvania Senate from the 32nd district
- In office January 1, 1907 – October 24, 1921
- Preceded by: Donald P. McPherson
- Succeeded by: Guy W. Brown

Personal details
- Born: March 10, 1870 German Township, Pennsylvania, U.S.
- Died: August 2, 1922 (aged 52) Uniontown, Pennsylvania, U.S.
- Party: Republican

William Evans Crow (March 10, 1870 – August 2, 1922) was an American lawyer and Republican party politician from Uniontown, Pennsylvania. He served in the Pennsylvania State Senate from 1907 until 1921, and was the body's President pro tempore in 1911. In 1921, he was appointed to the United States Senate, after Philander C. Knox died in office. Crow himself died in office less than a year after his appointment.

== Biography ==
William Evans Crow was born on March 10, 1870, in German Township, Fayette County, Pennsylvania. He received his education from the public schools and obtained college education at the Southwestern State Normal School, from which he graduated in 1890. He also attended Waynesburg College. After college, he worked in newspaper publishing for three years until studying law and being admitted to the bar in 1895. He subsequently practised law in Uniontown, Pennsylvania, until his appointment as assistant district attorney in 1896, a position in which he served until his election as district attorney in 1898. After serving for three years, he was elected to the Pennsylvania Senate, where he served from 1907 to 1921. In 1913, he was elected Chairman of the Republican State Committee of Pennsylvania.

Crow was appointed to the United States Senate on October 17, 1921, to fill a vacancy created by the death of Philander Knox, after which he resigned from the State Senate to assume his new role. Crow served in the U.S. Senate until his own death on August 2, 1922, at his home near Uniontown, Pennsylvania. He was interred in Uniontown Cemetery.

Crow was the father of Congressman William J. Crow.

== See also ==
- List of members of the United States Congress who died in office (1900–1949)

U.S. Senate
| Preceded by Philander Knox | U.S. senator (Class 1) from Pennsylvania; 1921–1922; Served alongside: Boies Penrose, George Pepper | Succeeded by David Reed |
Political offices
| Preceded by A.E. Sisson | President pro tempore of the Pennsylvania Senate; 1911 | Succeeded by George Wertz |
Pennsylvania State Senate
| Preceded by Donald McPherson | Member of the Pennsylvania Senate for the 32nd District; 1907–1921 | Succeeded by Guy Brown |
