= 1926 United States Senate election in Pennsylvania =

- November 2, 1926
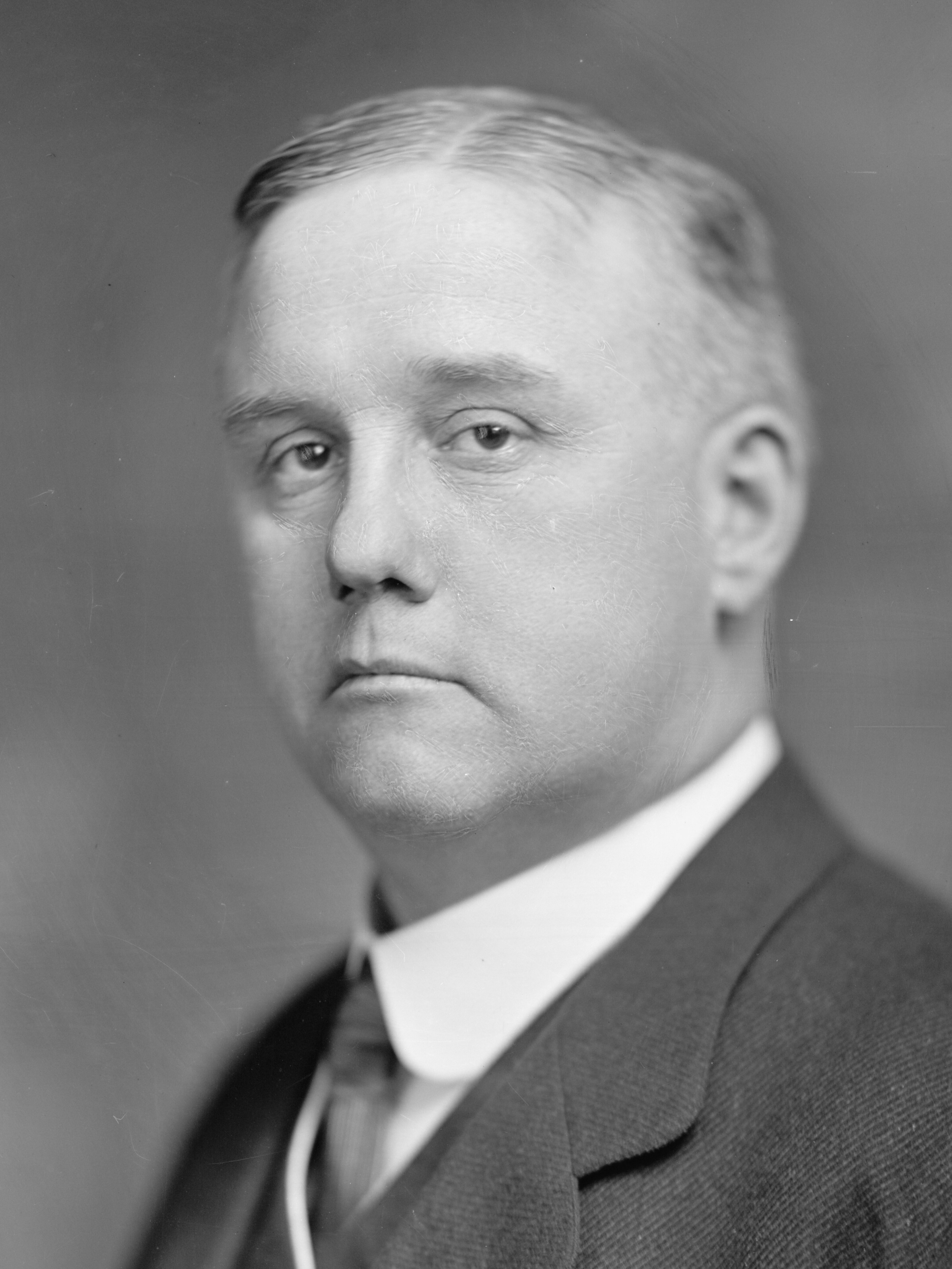

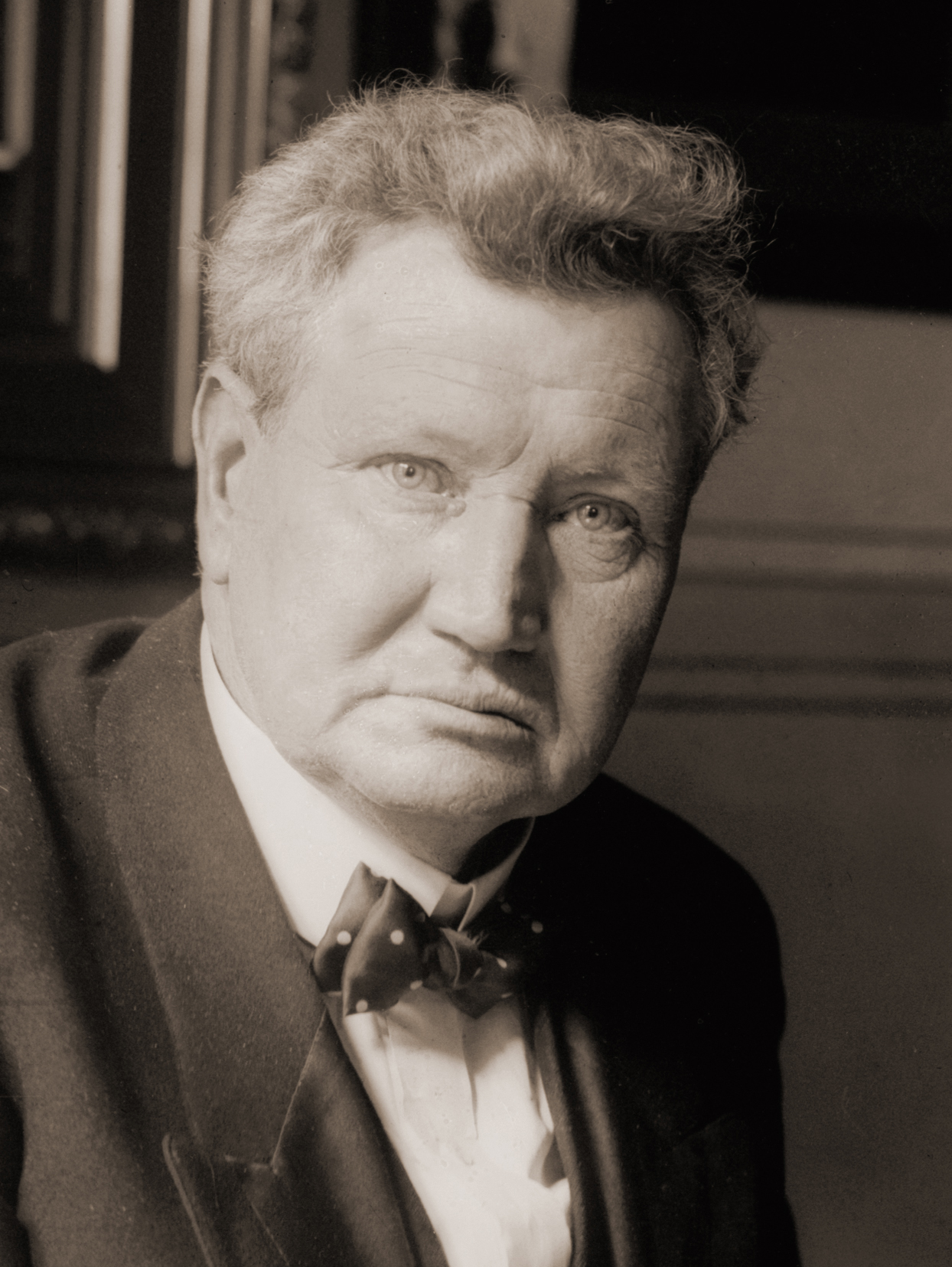
Nominee	William Scott Vare	William Bauchop Wilson
Party	Republican	Democratic
Popular vote	822,187	648,680
Percentage	54.64%	43.11%
- County results Vare: 40–50% 50–60% 60–70% 70–80% Wilson: 40–50% 50–60% 60–70% 70–80%
U.S. senator before election
George W. Pepper
Republican
Elected U.S. Senator
William Scott Vare (Note: Not seated)
Republican

The 1926 United States Senate election in Pennsylvania was held on November 2, 1926. Republican incumbent George W. Pepper ran for a second term in office but was defeated in the Republican primary by U.S. representative and Philadelphia political boss William Scott Vare. Vare won the general election, defeating Democratic opponent William Bauchop Wilson. He was not permitted to assume office, however, until an investigation was conducted into possible election fraud and corruption. Vare was ultimately unseated in December 1929 by the Senate, following charges of corruption.

Despite Wilson's loss, this is the last time that the following counties have voted Democratic: Bradford, Cameron, Huntingdon, Lebanon, McKean, Perry, Potter, Snyder, Sullivan, Susquehanna, Tioga, Union, Wayne, and Wyoming.

== Background ==
=== 1922 elections and Pennsylvania Republican factionalism ===
For many decades, the politics of Pennsylvania were controlled by a powerful Republican Party political machine based in Philadelphia and controlled by U.S. senators and political bosses Simon Cameron, J. Donald Cameron, Matthew Quay, and Boies Penrose in succession. On December 31, 1921, Penrose died in office (as had junior senator Philander C. Knox on October 12), creating a vacancy in both U.S. Senate seats.

Penrose died without an obvious successor, creating a power vacuum atop the Pennsylvania machine and setting off a struggle among at least three major factions:

- the Vare machine of South Philadelphia, built on African American and immigrant votes and led by William Scott Vare, the youngest of three wealthy brothers who controlled public contracts in the city through the state legislature and city hall;
- the Mellon banking family of Pittsburgh, which had little direct experience in electoral politics but was led by U.S. treasury secretary Andrew Mellon, the highest-ranking Republican in the state; and
- the Pennsylvania Manufacturers' Association, led by Joseph R. Grundy, a Bristol textile manufacturer and leading advocate for protective tariffs.

In April 1922, the various factions held a conference at Philadelphia to negotiate a unity ticket, led by Pennsylvania attorney general George E. Alter for governor and Pittsburgh lawyer David A. Reed and Philadelphia professor George W. Pepper for Senate. The ticket was generally balanced between eastern Pennsylvania (represented by Vare) and western Pennsylvania (represented by William Larimer Mellon Sr. and Pittsburgh boss Max G. Leslie), and the only factional leader disappointed in the result was Grundy, who instead supported an anti-machine ticket led by progressive Gifford Pinchot for governor.

Both Reed and Pepper easily won their primaries, but Pinchot upset Alter by fewer than 15,000 votes, owing partly to Grundy's endorsement and weak voter turnout for Alter in Allegheny County. Alter's losses in Allegheny, along with difficulty delivering votes for W. Harry Baker in the election for state party chair, demonstrated political weakness on the part of the Pittsburgh machine, enhancing the power of Philadelphia, which typically accounted for half of the statewide Republican vote.

Factional struggle dominated the Pennsylvania Republican Party, with the added complication of Governor Pinchot, who opposed all factions. This period was marked by a series of victories by the machine over Pinchot and by William Scott Vare, by now sole boss of the Philadelphia machine and expected challenger to Pepper in 1926, over the Mellon family and the Pittsburgh machine:

- In 1924, Pinchot, an ardent prohibitionist, called for a special counsel investigation into the Bureau of Internal Revenue, controlled by Treasury secretary Andrew Mellon, for allegedly lax enforcement of the Volstead Act; in response, the state party defeated Pinchot's campaign for delegate at-large to the 1924 Republican National Convention.
- Despite the landslide victory for Calvin Coolidge in the 1924 presidential election, about ten percent of Allegheny County voters abandoned the party ticket in favor of senator Robert M. La Follette. Despite massive fundraising efforts for Coolidge and Andrew actively campaigning for the ticket, the Mellon family was further weakened versus the Philadelphia machine.
- The Pittsburgh machine was divided by a bitter conflict between mayor William A. Magee and party boss Max G. Leslie, who supported Charles H. Kline. Senator Reed remained neutral in the 1925 mayoral primary, and W. L. Mellon left the state for a fishing trip to Canada. The mayoral campaign ended with Magee's withdrawal from the race, but the protracted intraparty struggle further handicapped Pepper's political base entering the 1926 campaign.

=== Campaign spending regulations ===
Constitutional issues around the regulation of campaign spending were central to the debate over the election.

In 1918, the Senate had refused to seat Truman H. Newberry on the grounds that his large primary campaign expenditures violated the Federal Corrupt Practices Act (FCPA). However, the Supreme Court of the United States declared the Act null and void in Newberry v. United States on May 2, 1921, because the constitution did not give Congress the authority to regulate campaigns for nomination to federal office, and Newberry was awarded his seat.

In response to the Newberry decision, Congress revised the FCPA in 1921 to specifically exclude campaigns for party nominations and limit general election spending to $10,000 or an amount "equal to the amount obtained by multiplying three cents by the total number of votes cast at the last general election for all candidates for the office which the candidate seeks, but in no event exceeding $25,000 if a candidate for Senator," excluding expenses for state fees, personal expenses, travel expenses, food and drink, stationery, printing, mailing, and telephone fees. The amended 1921 Act also expressly forbade nationally chartered banks and corporations from contributing to any political campaign and required candidates to file complete reports of expenditures with the secretary of the United States Senate at stated intervals within five days of the election.

== Republican primary ==
=== Candidates ===
- George W. Pepper, incumbent U.S. senator since 1922
- Gifford Pinchot, governor of Pennsylvania and former chief of the United States Forest Service
- William Scott Vare, U.S. representative from Philadelphia

=== Campaign ===
In September 1925, efforts to agree on a machine candidate began in earnest with a series of meetings were held in Pittsburgh and Washington, D.C. to settle the conflict between Pepper and Vare; however, no agreement could be reached. The decisive conference was held in March 1926 at the Washington home of Andrew Mellon and attended by W. L. Mellon, David A. Reed, Pittsburgh boss Max G. Leslie, party chair W. Harry Baker, and the candidates. Joseph R. Grundy joined via telephone. At the conference, the Pepper supporters offered Vare his choice of governor in exchange for his withdrawal; Vare rejected the offer and refused to attend the second day of meetings, instead visiting Calvin Coolidge at the White House. Believing Coolidge would remain neutral in the primary and the Pittsburgh machine was insignificant, Vare left Washington confident in victory over both Pinchot and the diminished western Pennsylvanians, as well as his ability to carry Edward E. Beidleman to victory in the primary for governor.

On March 24, 1926, the Mellon family formally announced their endorsements for Pepper and for John Stuchell Fisher in the gubernatorial election. In endorsing Fisher, the Mellons realigned themselves with Grundy and broke from Leslie, who supported Beidleman. In effect, the Mellon–Grundy alliance pitted the state's two leading fundraisers against the state's two leading political machines. The Mellons spent hundreds of thousands of dollars on the campaign to flood mailboxes and saturate news media with advertisements for Pepper and Fisher. William Larimer Mellon claimed that the family "have not gotten into the campaign in an attempt to become bosses but for the preservation of principles." Grundy initially abstained from publicly supporting Pepper, offering his endorsement and $615,000 in campaign funding to Fisher only; however, one month before the primary, he met with William Larimer Mellon at the Bellevue-Stratford Hotel in Philadelphia and agreed to back Pepper in exchange for the Mellons' support of Fisher.

In May, Reed and U.S. labor secretary James J. Davis, a former steelworker, held a major rally in Pittsburgh for Pepper. Mellon himself addressed the rally, giving the only explicitly political speech of his life, emphasizing his and the administration's continued support for Pepper.

=== Endorsements ===
George W. Pepper (incumbent)

U.S. executive branch officials

- Andrew Mellon, U.S. secretary of the treasury
- James J. Davis, U.S. secretary of labor

U.S. senators

- David A. Reed, senior U.S. senator from Pennsylvania

=== Results ===
In the largest primary in the history of Pennsylvania, Vare defeated Pepper by over 80,000 votes.

1926 Republican U.S. Senate primary
Party	Candidate	Votes	%
Republican	William Scott Vare	596,928	41.12%
Republican	George W. Pepper (incumbent)	515,502	35.51%
Republican	Gifford Pinchot	339,127	23.36%
Write-in		20	0.00%
Total votes		1,451,577	100.00%

=== Analysis ===
Senator David A. Reed attributed the result to the issue of prohibition, with Pepper and Pinchot dividing the majority of Pennsylvania Republicans who supported the policy. Pepper himself attributed the defeat to various elements, including the unplanned alliance with Fisher and Grundy, who won the gubernatorial primary but had alienated many of Pepper's former supporters. The New Republic interpreted the results as a rebuke to Coolidge and Mellon.

=== Aftermath ===
On May 17, the United States Senate established the Special Committee Investigating Senatorial Campaign Expenditures, chaired by James A. Reed of Missouri, to investigate the Pennsylvania and Illinois primaries. Reed's initial investigation into Pennsylvania focused on the Mellons, revealing the campaign had received contributions from each of Andrew, William, and Richard B. Mellon of about $25,000 (equivalent to approximately $363,529 in 2025) to the Pepper–Fisher joint campaign, had raised over $300,000 (approximately $4,362,345 in 2025) in the Pittsburgh area alone, and spent nearly $2 million (approximately $29.08 million in 2025) throughout Pennsylvania.

As a concession to the Mellons, Vare consented to the election of William Larimer Mellon as state party chairman.

== Democratic primary ==
=== Candidates ===
- William Bauchop Wilson, former U.S. labor secretary

=== Results ===
1926 Democratic U.S. Senate primary
Party	Candidate	Votes	%
Democratic	William Bauchop Wilson	153,750	98.03%
Republican	Gifford Pinchot (write-in)	1,382	0.88%
Republican	William Scott Vare (write-in)	781	0.50%
Republican	George W. Pepper (write-in)	329	0.21%
Write-in		592	0.38%
Total votes		156,834	100.00%

== Prohibition primary ==
=== Candidates ===
- Elisha Kent Kane
- Gifford Pinchot, governor of Pennsylvania and former chief of the United States Forest Service

=== Results ===
1926 Prohibition U.S. Senate primary
Party	Candidate	Votes	%
Prohibition	Elisha Kent Kane	2,908	55.36%
Prohibition	Gifford Pinchot	2,036	38.76%
Write-in		309	5.88%
Total votes		5,253	100.00%

== Socialist primary ==
=== Candidates ===
- Cora M. Bixler

=== Results ===
1926 Socialist U.S. Senate primary
Party	Candidate	Votes	%
Socialist	Cora Bixler	1,761	86.03%
Write-in		286	13.97%
Total votes		2,047	100.00%

== Labor primary ==
=== Candidates ===
- George W. Pepper, incumbent U.S. senator since 1922
- Gifford Pinchot, governor of Pennsylvania and former chief of the United States Forest Service
- William Scott Vare, U.S. representative from Philadelphia

=== Results ===
1926 Labor U.S. Senate primary
Party	Candidate	Votes	%
Labor	Gifford Pinchot	521	50.68%
Labor	William Scott Vare	348	33.85%
Labor	George W. Pepper (incumbent)	120	11.67%
Write-in		39	3.79%
Total votes		1,028	100.00%

== General election ==
=== Candidates ===
- A. J. Carey (Workers)
- Elisha K. Kane (Prohibition)
- Robert Colvin Macauley Jr. (Commonwealth Land)
- George W. Snyder (Socialist)
- William Scott Vare, U.S. representative from Philadelphia (Republican)
- William Bauchop Wilson, former U.S. labor secretary (Democratic)

=== Campaign ===
Although the general election was less eventful than the primary, with the Republican factions consolidating in support of Vare, rumors of electoral fraud continued through the fall in parallel to the Reed Committee investigation into campaign finances.

=== Results ===
General election results
Party	Candidate	Votes	%	±%
Republican	William Scott Vare	822,187	54.64%	▼2.96
Democratic	William B. Wilson	648,680	43.11%	▲10.19
Prohibition	Elisha K. Kane	19,523	1.30%	▼1.10
Socialist	George W. Snyder	9,869	0.66%	▼2.03
Workers	A. J. Carey	3,094	0.21%	N/A
Commonwealth Land	Robert Colvin Macauley, Jr.	1,053	0.07%	N/A
Write-in		290	0.02%	N/A
Total votes		1,504,696	100.00%	

== Aftermath, investigation, and expulsion ==
=== Reed Committee report and challenge ===
On December 22, the Reed Committee issued its report on the primary and general elections in Pennsylvania, finding that the Vare–Beidleman campaign had spent $788,934, as opposed to $1,804,979 for the Pepper–Fisher ticket, $187,029 for Pinchot, and only $10,088 for Wilson on the Democratic ticket. Although expenditures on behalf of Vare were far less than on behalf of Pepper, the Senate concluded that they were too large to admit Vare to his seat; when he presented his credentials, he was refused the oath of office until a more detailed investigation was completed.

On January 10, 1927, Pinchot complicated the contest further including a criticism of Vare in the customary letter of certification of the Senate race to Coolidge. Although Pinchot stated that Vare had been elected on the face of the returns, he argued that Vare was not "duly chosen" because "his nomination was partly bought and partly stolen." The Pinchot letter was taken as the strongest evidence against seating Vare, and it was treated by some progressives as conclusive evidence that Vare had won through fraud. On March 4, Wilson charged that Vare-controlled election boards in Philadelphia and Pittsburgh had counted him out by completely ignoring his votes, arguing that he was legally entitled to the seat over Vare.

=== Criminal prosecutions ===
In parallel to the Reed committee's investigation, criminal trials were held throughout the state of Pennsylvania in connection with the 1926 elections. In one trial, three Pittsburgh election officials were jailed after testifying that "they always do it that way in Homestead." The public trials helped to undermine Vare's case in the Senate and popular support for his election.

=== Investigation and debate ===
The Reed Committee investigation into the 1926 election dragged through the summer of 1929, during which time Pennsylvania was represented by only one senator. Debate was delayed by the use of legal technicalities on both sides, political pressures within the Senate, and the doubt of at least one committee member, William H. King, as to Vare's guilt. In August 1928, Vare became ill, further delaying final action for a year and a half.

During this time, the committee heard testimony from numerous witnesses. Pinchot testified before the committee that Vare's machine had stuffed ballot boxes, ignored the votes of other candidates, and bribed voters outright. Allegheny County commissioner Charles C. McGovern, a Pinchot ally, testified that the race was decided by "a pure purchase of votes" and that fraud was rampant in Pittsburgh. Philadelphia mayor Harry Mackey testified in support of Vare, defending the campaign expenditures. Philadelphia real estate mogul Albert M. Greenfield also testified twice to account for his $125,000 contribution to the Vare campaign, and Philadelphia sheriff Thomas W. Cunningham refused to reveal the source of his donation to the Vare campaign.

By the end of 1927, the committee delivered its full report to the Senate. On December 9, 1927, George W. Norris, one of the leading opponents to Vare's election, offered a resolution denying him admission to the Senate, which passed 56–30 with a recommendation to gather more evidence before conclusive action was taken. By now, specific charges against Vare for personally directing excessive spending and electoral fraud had become clear. As evidence, the Reed committee reported that there was an implausible number of Philadelphia wards in which Vare's opponents received zero votes, finding that in Philadelphia alone, only 181 out of 1,500 electoral precincts had been tabulated correctly, 674 precincts had issued a total of 21,522 illegal poll tax receipts, 2,018 names had been forged completely in 18 randomly selected precincts, 395 precincts had reported votes exceeding the total number of registered voters, and only 25 percent of judges and inspectors of elections had been duly elected. In Pittsburgh, the charges were similar, revealing 174 tampered ballots and 876 fraudulent voters.

Vare hired a staff of lawyers, including Francis Shunk Brown, Edward A. Kelly, Edward W. Wells, and James M. Beck, to defend against the charges. He received political support from his intraparty rivals Andrew Mellon, who publicly approved of the primary campaign spending, and David A. Reed, who argued that the expenditures were an unavoidable evil of the primary election system. Brown, as the lead attorney on Vare's behalf, pointed out that each party had spent more per capita for the 1928 presidential election in Pennsylvania than Vare had two years prior and argued that his spending was within traditional Pennsylvania practice. The defense also pointed out that the margin of the general election was large enough that Brown could only be seated in Vare's place by throwing out the entire vote of both Pittsburgh and Philadelphia. With respect to Pittsburgh, the defense argued that the committee presented largely circumstantial evidence and relied on obviously partial testimony from Vare's political opponents, McGovern and Pinchot.

In light of the Newberry decision and 1921 amendments to the FCPA, the Vare defense team, particularly Beck, who was a recognized expert in constitutional law, argued that the Senate did not have the authority to investigate or judge the results of primary elections or bar any member because of illegal nomination for office. Despite the Newberry precedent, the Reed committee maintained its authority to investigate the primary, as explicitly argued by committee member Sam G. Bratton of New Mexico, who stated, "Four of us on that committee are united in the belief... that the facts transpiring in connection with the primary, and frauds and illegal practices in connection with the regular election, taint the title of Mr. Vare to the office, and we expect to vote to exclude him on the whole record when the report is considered by the Senate." Beck also argued that states alone had the constitutional authority to decide the fitness of a senator-elect. Finally, Vare's lawyers argued that Vare was being denied the right to an impartial trial.

By the summer of 1928, the Reed committee was satisifed that it had collected enough evidence to unseat Vare and prepared its final report. However, Reed sought to have Vare testify on his own behalf, and in August, he suffered a paralytic stroke that left him unable to appear. He was taken to his cottage in Florida to convalesce. In November, he returned to Philadelphia to suppress a political coup by mayor Harry Mackey and Albert M. Greenfield. In January 1929, Reed insisted that this proved Vare was well enough to testify, and when Vare protested, the committee issued its final report on February 22, 1929. The final report, which was endorsed by committee member William H. King, who had been the lone holdout, called for Vare to be barred from the Senate; Vare and his attorneys privately conceded that defeat was likely. Reed delayed further action upon being convinced that Vare was in fact very ill, and the final vote was delayed until the next session of Congress.

=== Final vote ===
On September 9, 1929, George W. Norris introduced a new resolution to deny Vare admission to the Senate. Debate lasted for two weeks, until it was agreed to defer debate until December after Vare requested that the votes of thirty-one more counties should be recounted. On December 3, the deadline for counting passed, and Norris reintroduced his resolution, demanding that the Senate reach a final decision.

On December 4, 1929, Vare finally testified before the Reed committee, "leaning heavily on a desk under the watchful eyes of his physicians." He spoke for about twenty minutes, testifying:

"The charges made against me so preyed on my mind that I trembled upon the very edge of eternity. ... I never stole an election. ... How unfair and unjust my accusers have been in attempting to twist mere clerical irregularities and technicalities into acts of political fraud and conspiracy."

On the next day, December 5, the Senate rendered its final verdict, voting 58–29 against seating Vare. Wilson was also denied the seat by a vote of 66–15, leaving the seat vacant until a replacement could be elected.

=== Aftermath ===
Governor Fisher appointed Joseph R. Grundy to the vacant seat despite threats from Gerald Nye of North Dakota that the Senate could reject any candidate affiliated with the Mellons. Vare announced two days after his rejection by the Senate that he would run again for the seat in 1930; however, he later dropped out of the race, citing ill health, and endorsed James J. Davis for the seat.

Vare remained bitter over the decision for many years until his death, writing in his 1933 autobiography,

"This was in all probability the most merciless investigation conducted by any committee of the United States Senate. Its cause, in my opinion... was handled purely to manufacture capital for the Reed boom for President of the United States [in 1928] and to assist the Democratic Party, abetted by the so-called 'progressive group,' likened later by Senator George H. Moses of New Hampshire to 'wild asses,' to spread unfair propaganda at the expense of Pennsylvania."

Public opinion in response to the investigation in newspapers and opinion surveys was mixed. In 1935, University of Pennsylvania political scientist John T. Salter reviewed the case as part of an extensive study of the Vare political machine. Although Salter condemned the machine in general, he attributed the Senate decision to refuse Vare admission not to "any illegal act, but for general reasons similar to those that closed the portals of the Union League to him—he was a ward politician without any social background; in addition to that, his campaign expenditures had been excessive." A 1961 study of the case by University of Pittsburgh doctoral student Samuel J. Astorino agreed, concluding the committee's judgement "took precedence over what was constitutional" and that Vare was the victim of Reed's presidential ambitions and a general campaign against political bossism, which singled him out for symbolic reasons.
