= Senator Vare =

Senator Vare may refer to:

- Flora M. Vare (1874–1962), Pennsylvania State Senate
- William Scott Vare (1867–1934), Pennsylvania State Senate
