= Senator Grundy =

Senator Grundy may refer to:

- Felix Grundy (1777–1840), U.S. Senator from Tennessee from 1839 to 1840
- Joseph R. Grundy (1863–1961), U.S. Senator from Pennsylvania from 1929 to 1930
