= Robert von Moschzisker =

American judge (1870–1939)

Chief Justice of the Supreme Court of Pennsylvania
- In office 1921–1930
- Preceded by: J. Hay Brown
- Succeeded by: Robert S. Frazer

Justice of the Supreme Court of Pennsylvania
- In office 1909–1921

Personal details
- Born: March 6, 1870 Philadelphia, Pennsylvania
- Died: November 21, 1939 (aged 69)
- Spouse: Anne Macbeth

Robert von Moschzisker (March 6, 1870 – November 21, 1939) was a justice of the Supreme Court of Pennsylvania from 1909 to 1921 and chief justice from 1921 to 1930.

== Biography ==
Robert von Moschzisker was born on March 6, 1870, to Franz and Clara (née Harrison) von Moschzisker in Philadelphia, Pennsylvania. His father was a Polish immigrant. He was educated by private tutors and lost both of his parents during childhood, subsequently studying law under Edward Shippen beginning at age 13. He was admitted to the bar on June 1, 1896, and became an associate of Shippen. In 1902, Moschzisker became an Assistant District Attorney in Philadelphia, rising from third assistant to first assistant before his election to the Philadelphia Court of Common Pleas in November 1903.

In November 1909, Moschzisker was elected to the Supreme Court of Pennsylvania and assumed office as an associate justice in 1910. He served in that capacity until becoming chief justice in January 1921, and served as chief justice until 1930. Moschzisker was on President Warren G. Harding’s shortlist to replace Supreme Court Justice Mahlon Pitney after it become known that he was suffering from a terminal stroke; however, the nomination eventually went to Edward Terry Sanford.

In his later career, he declined nomination to the United States Senate in the 1938 election. He died on November 21, 1939.
