= George W. Pepper =

American politician

George Wharton Pepper
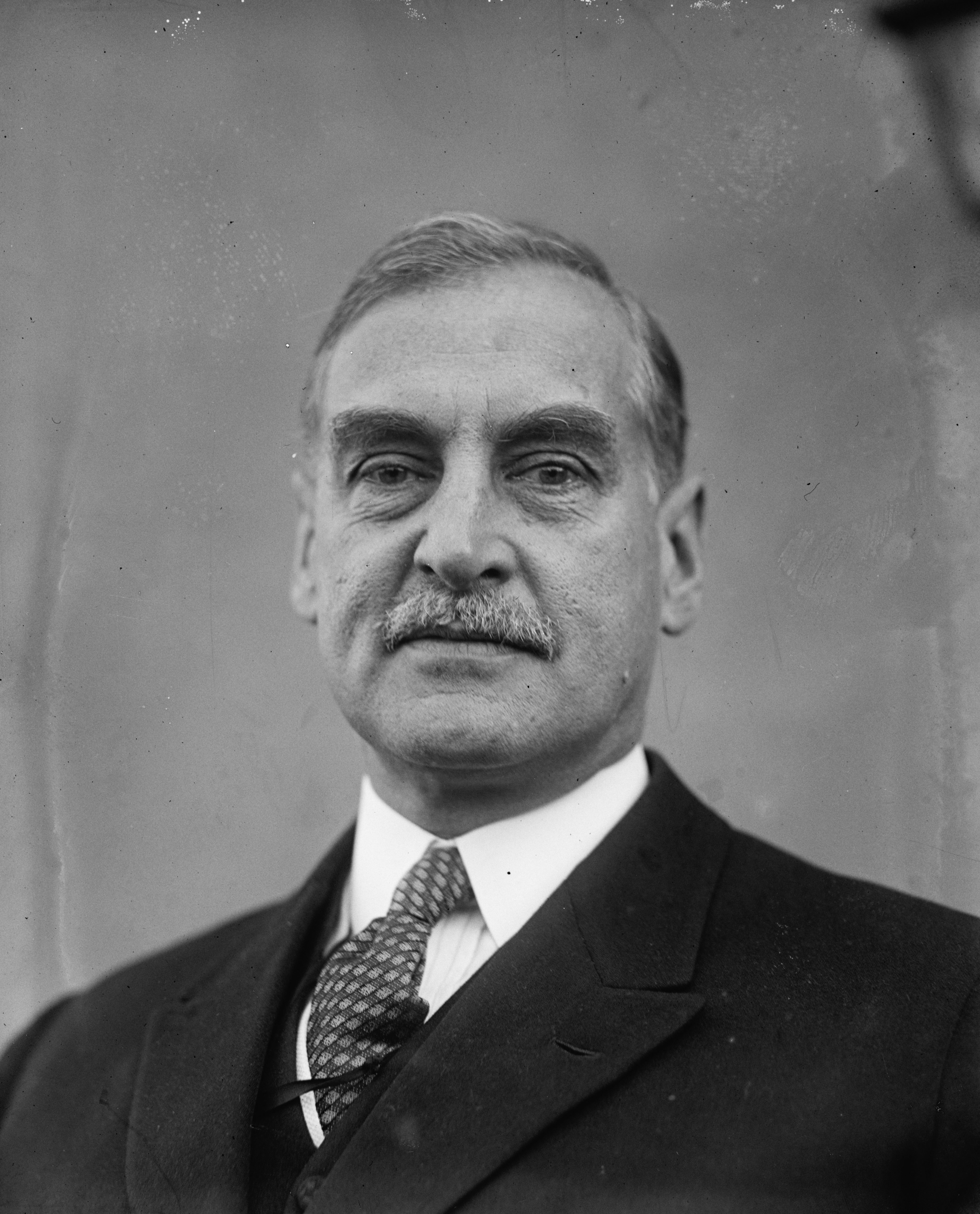
- Pepper in January 1922

United States Senator from Pennsylvania
- In office January 9, 1922 – March 3, 1927
- Preceded by: Boies Penrose
- Succeeded by: William Vare^{[a]}

Member of the Republican National Committee from Pennsylvania
- In office June 10, 1922 – May 12, 1928
- Preceded by: Boies Penrose
- Succeeded by: William Wallace Atterbury

Personal details
- Born: March 16, 1867 Philadelphia, Pennsylvania, U.S.
- Died: May 24, 1961 (aged 94) Devon, Pennsylvania, U.S.
- Party: Republican
- a.Vare was not permitted to qualify for the seat, though his defeat of Pepper in the primary election was recognized by the Senate. However, due to alleged election fraud, Vare was never seated, and a special election was held in 1930, which was won by Republican James Davis.

George Wharton Pepper (March 16, 1867 – May 24, 1961) was an American lawyer, law professor at the University of Pennsylvania Law School, Christian activist, and Republican politician from Philadelphia, Pennsylvania. He represented Pennsylvania in the United States Senate, and founded the law firm of Pepper Hamilton.

== Early life and education ==
Pepper was born to upper-class parents, physician (and former Union cavalry officer) George Pepper and his wife, the former Mehitable ("Hitty") Markoe Wharton, on March 16, 1867. Each was descended from families prominent in the region since the colonial era: Pennsylvania Dutch on his father's side and Quakers and Episcopalians on his mother's. He was born in his paternal grandmother's house, in a fashionable neighborhood, 1215 Walnut Street. Their first child had died in infancy, and the family soon moved to quarters on Pine Street. Dr. Wharton died when George was seven and his only sister Frances a newborn, so the family moved to smaller quarters, 346 S. 16th Street in the Rittenhouse Square neighborhood with his grandmother. His mother home-schooled her then weak-eyed son, with the assistance of his uncle, Dr. William Pepper (whom he considered like a father after his own father's demise), and later a blind tutor, John F. Maher. His grandmother's summer estate on the Schuylkill River later became one of those consolidated into Laurel Hill Cemetery. He considered Willie Ryder his best friend, noting that he was "colored"; and also remembered informally competing at memory exercises with boys from a nearby prep school. In 1876, his mother remarried, to his father's friend and former classmate, lawyer Ernest Zantzinger.

Admitted to his father's (and step-father's) alma mater, the University of Pennsylvania, Pepper was active in athletics, rowing crew, becoming captain of his class football and cricket teams and winning the hammer throw for the track-and-field team, and in drama. In addition to academic activities, for which he earned a Phi Beta Kappa key he often twirled later in his life, Pepper started the school newspaper and edited a literary magazine, which later merged into The Daily Pennsylvanian. He also joined several organizations, including the Zeta Psi fraternity, Sketch club and Philomathean Society. Pepper graduated first in his class from the college in 1887. Then he followed the examples of his maternal grandfather and stepfather, entering the University of Pennsylvania Law School, from which he also graduated first in his class and with several honors in 1889.

On November 25, 1890, in New Haven, Connecticut, Pepper married Charlotte Root Fisher (1865-1951), daughter of Professor George Park Fisher, dean of the Yale Divinity School. They had three children: Adeline Louise Forbes Pepper (1892-1971), George Wharton Pepper, Jr. (1895-1949), and Charlotte Eleanor Pepper (1897-1930). Both daughters married Fitz Eugene Newbold, Adeline seven years after her sister Charlotte's death and eventually surviving him as well as her parents.

== Career ==
During law school, Pepper worked part-time for the prestigious firm Biddle and Ward. He was admitted to the bar in 1889. He then taught law at his alma mater for more than two decades, as well as maintained a private practice. In his autobiography, dedicated to "Andrew Hamilton and all other Philadelphia Lawyers Past and Present", Pepper acknowledged that public dissatisfaction with the bar had always existed, but thought it increasing throughout his lifetime. He thus devoted the penultimate chapter as "a treatise for lawyers only", cautioning them that the poor repute to which the some deserve "to be scolded, is one whose offense does not consist in representing a corporation or in being disloyal to his client, but in allowing fidelity to that client to dim or black out entirely his sense of public duty." He thought those so indifferent to public interest were few and could be readily identified, but specifically warned against the "far more subtle and more common vice of regarding the client as a suitable subject for exploitation" cautioning "[t]he instant that the attorney's interest becomes inconsistent with the client's the attorney's interest must be forgotten."

=== Academic ===
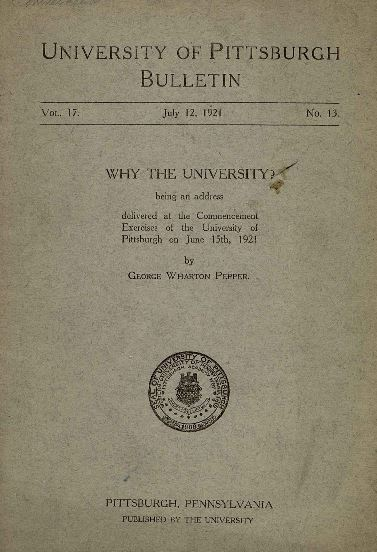
the front cover of the transcript of the commencement address given by George Wharton Pepper in July 1921

Teaching at the Penn Law school for 21 years, Pepper began as a teaching fellow and soon became the first Algernon Sydney Biddle Professor of Law, a position he held from 1893 until 1910, when he became a trustee of the university. In 1890–1891, he visited Harvard Law School in Cambridge, Massachusetts and studied the case system of instruction being introduced by Dean Christopher C. Langdell, and applied by John Chipman Gray in Property, James Bradley Thayer in Evidence and Constitutional Law, James Barr Ames in Torts, Trusts and Pleading, and Samuel Williston in Contracts. Pepper primarily taught about corporations, partnership and insurance.

After World War I, Draper and Elihu Root founded the American Law Institute, with funding from the Carnegie Corporation and George W. Wickersham as its first President. Pepper became a member of its governing council in 1930 and succeeded Wickersham as president from 1936 to 1947. He also served on the Federal Advisory Committee which drafted the Federal Rules of Civil Procedure, with former Attorney General William D. Mitchell as chairman Charles L. Clark as reporter. He delivered the commencement address at the graduation ceremony at the University of Pittsburgh in 1921.

For his academic pursuits, Pepper was elected to both the American Philosophical Society and the American Academy of Arts and Sciences.

=== Author ===
Pepper wrote over 40 articles in various legal publications. and, from 1892 to 1895, edited and published the University of Pennsylvania Law Review (then the American Law Register and Review), with his friend, William Draper Lewis. His 1895 presentation to the Pennsylvania Bar Association about legal education prompted reforms. With Lewis, he edited the Digest of Decisions and Encyclopedia of Pennsylvania Law, 1754–1898 (1898–1906). Pepper also authored The Borderland of Federal and State Decisions, Pleading at Common Law and Under the Codes , Digest of the Laws of Pennsylvania 1700 - 1901, and Digest of Decisions and Encyclopaedia of Pennsylvania.

=== Private practice ===
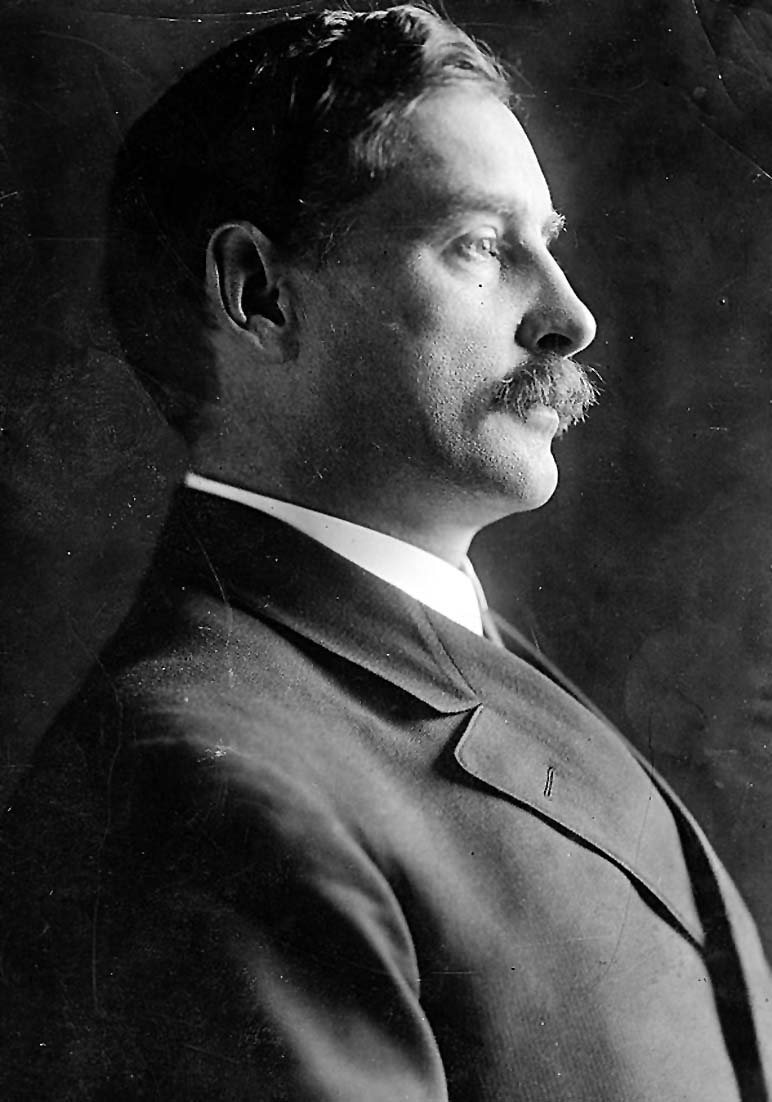
Pepper circa 1913

Pepper served as president of the Pennsylvania Bar Association early in his career, and as chancellor of the Philadelphia Bar Association late in his career, from 1930 to 1932. As he retired, his law firm in 1954 merged with Evans, Bayard & Frick (whose leading partner by that time was Francis M. Sheetz) to form Pepper, Bodine, Frick, Scheetz & Hamilton, which eventually became Pepper Hamilton; the 35 member firm moved to the building of its largest client, The Fidelity Bank.

The earliest case he recounted in his autobiography concerned a bequest to the City of Philadelphia by Benjamin Franklin in 1790, which was to fund interest-bearing loans to deserving artisans. Newly minted lawyer Pepper lost the case brought on behalf of Franklin's heirs in 1890, but learned "in any human system for the administration of justice there must be a reserved judicial right to refuse in exceptional cases to stretch beyond the breaking point a legal principle that is sound enough for everyday use." Five decades later, the Orphans Court (which was found to lack jurisdiction in the original case) appointed him Master to determine question under Franklin's will and thus facilitate the administration of the trust which as a youthful advocate he had tried to set aside.

Pepper also learned from his days trying many cases for the Union Traction Company (Philadelphia's streetcar purveyor) that perjury is plentiful but Philadelphia's jurists, while disposed to favor plaintiffs, were nonetheless quick to detect fraud and prompt to condemn it. He also found jurors sympathetic to anyone who has acted under provocation, and apt to resent the conduct of the provocateur, and proudly recounted a cross-examination he had made before Judge Mayer Sulzberger.

Pepper recounted his first brush with politics occurred as Republican boss Matthew Quay's term as Senator expired before Pennsylvania's legislature could reappoint him, due to a revolt led by State Senator William Flinn, who blocked the reappointment despite daily ballots from January until adjournment in April. Governor Stone then gave Quay a temporary appointment, which led to protests in the Senate. After the argument, a senator had mistaken Pepper for Pennsylvania's Attorney General, Elkins, although in fact Pepper had written the opposing brief. The Senate refused to recognize Quay's appointment, which eventually reduced his power, although the case led to a friendship between Pepper and Elkins (who had hoped to succeed Stone as Governor, but became a justice of the Supreme Court of Pennsylvania instead).

In the early 1900s, a federal judge in Massachusetts appointed Pepper receiver for the Bay State Gas Company, a bankrupt Massachusetts utility which had been promoted by former Philadelphian J. Edward Addicks, who had also caused controversy (and the Seventeenth Amendment to the United States Constitution by trying to buy the Senate seat from Delaware). Pepper then sued a number of nationally known businessmen, including William Rockefeller, Henry Rogers, and Thomas Lawson, for enriching themselves at the expense of the utility, and secured several recoveries, as well as a successful receivership of the utility.

Pepper represented Gifford Pinchot in connection with the Pinchot–Ballinger controversy, which began his political career on the national scene, as discussed below.

He was counsel to the National and American League baseball clubs, defeating the application of the Sherman Antitrust Act to their activities in Chicago in 1915 before judge Kenesaw Mountain Landis in preliminary injunction case. However, it was revived four years later after the Black Sox Scandal and his clients received an unfavorable jury verdict, which was reversed by the Supreme Court in Federal Baseball Club v. National League (1922) after lawyer Pepper and Judge Landis (who by then became baseball Commissioner) revised the leagues' organizational structure, Pepper writing the caption for the new series of agreements, "Play Fair. Play Hard. Play for the Team."

While in the Senate, Pepper maintained a reduced private practice. The cases of which he was most proud of during that time were Frick v. Pennsylvania, an inheritance tax case, and Myers v. United States, which he argued as amicus curiae at the invitation of the Supreme court, concerning President Wilson's removal of a postmaster. Although the Court decided that the legislative act requiring Senatorial consent to such removal was unconstitutional, it thanked him for his service and he believed the decision vindicated President Andrew Johnson's position with respect to the Tenure of Office Act, and that the powerful dissent by Justices Holmes, McReynolds and Brandeis might eventually receive favorable future reconsideration. Pepper also took pride in his handling of the George Otis Smith case (concerning the Federal Power Commission), where Pepper vindicated Presidential rights against the Senate, having refused a senatorial delegation's offer to represent them but accepting that of Attorney General Mitchell.

He participated in the reorganization of Bankers Trust Co., the first Philadelphia bank to fail in the Great Depression.

Later, Pepper condemned the mania for arbitration, which he encountered in a controversy between American Telephone and Telegraph and Warner Brothers, warning that the high per diem compensation demanded by arbitrators would not ensure that they would dispose of the controversy fairly and in short order, but instead would more likely extend matters as each of the two original arbiters selected by the parties will act as unofficial advocate for the side appointing him.

He concluded his advice for fellow attorneys by quoting Justice Oliver Wendell Holmes Jr., "I like your rapture over the law, I only fear that it may be dimmed as you get into the actualities (in the sense of the hard side) of life. But if, as I hope, and as what you write indicates, you bear the fire in your belly, it will survive and transfigure the hard facts."

== Lay church leader ==
Due to his devout mother's (and stepfather's) influence, Pepper became a lifelong Episcopalian. He was confirmed in his parish church St. Mark's Church on Easter Eve, 1879. It was initially near his family home, but he and his wife continued their membership after they moved to the Philadelphia Main Line in the 1920s ("Fox Creek Farm" then "Hillhouse" in Devon).

In 1907 Wharton gave the major address at the General Convention of the Episcopal Church, celebrating 300 years of English Christianity in America. He also wrote The Way: A Devotional Book for Boys (1909). Pepper became the first layman to lecture in theology at the Yale Divinity School, delivering the Lyman Beecher lecture in 1915 and publishing it as A Voice from the Crowd. He strongly believed in what fellow Philadelphian Anthony Joseph Drexel Biddle called "Athletic Christianity", and continued to work out sculling on the Delaware river into his old age. He also became a Master Mason of the Grand Lodge of Pennsylvania.

Pepper remained active in national church affairs, including several times as General Convention delegate. He served on the Board of Missions (where he worked with J. Pierpont Morgan and learned to admire Bishop Charles Henry Brent. He also served on the General Board of Religious Education (GBRE) with bishops Ethelbert Talbot, Chauncey Brewster, David H. Greer, Thomas F. Gailor and Edward L. Parsons, as well as distinguished laymen Nicholas Murray Butler (president of Columbia University) and Robert Hallowell Gardiner III. Pepper became the Episcopal delegate to the World Conference of Faith and Order. He also helped finance and organize the building of the Washington National Cathedral.

His wife Charlotte was active in charitable activities, receiving a decoration for her work during the First World War from King Albert of Belgium, as well as successfully leading a campaign to fund a maternity building at the University of Pennsylvania hospital. Nonetheless, Pepper also reportedly had a mistress, whom he took to various functions during the First World War and afterward.

== Political career ==
Pepper initially was a Democrat, as was his mother's family and his initial legal mentor George W. Biddle, and he voted for Grover Cleveland in the 1888 presidential election. However, by 1892, he left the Biddle law office and switched his allegiance to the Republican party, especially the Progressive wing of Theodore Roosevelt and William Howard Taft.

In 1905 he was a member of the City Party, a reform group that challenged the Republican political machine in Philadelphia. At the request of Henry Stimson, Pepper agreed to represent Gifford Pinchot whose charges of undue favoritism against Taft's Secretary of the interior, Ballinger, had led to a scandal, the Pinchot–Ballinger controversy, as well as congressional hearings. Despite his admiration for Roosevelt, Pepper supported Taft in 1912, but rebuffed an offer of a judgeship on the United States Circuit Court of Appeals as well as refused to respond to movements that attempted to draft him for mayor of Philadelphia. His involvement in national and international church affairs, discussed above, also prompted his increased political activism.

During the first World War, Pepper found it difficult to stay "neutral in thought"; despite his German ancestry, he was an unabashed anglophile throughout his life. He later admitted "I began as a violent partisan of the Allies". He first participated in the Preparedness Movement in 1914, and during the next two summers was a member of the Provisional Training Regiment at Plattsburgh, New York. After America entered on the Allied side, Pepper served as chairman of the Pennsylvania Council of National Defense (1917–1919). His nephew Franklin Pepper, whom he called "dear to me as a son", died a war hero in France in 1918.

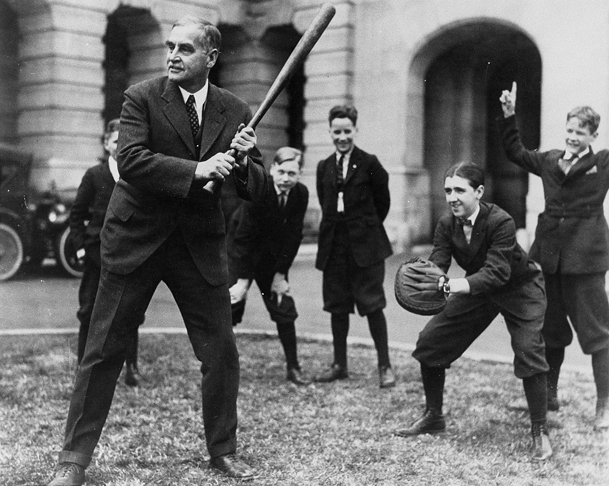
Senator Pepper enjoys a game of baseball with the Senate pages in the 1920s.

A stalwart Republican with some isolationist tendencies, Pepper attacked the Versailles Peace Treaty for its harshness, and later President Wilson and the League of Nations, although his moralistic and legalistic mindset favored international order based on international law, and he continued to attend international legal association meetings.

Pepper served as a member of Pennsylvania's commission on constitutional revision in 1920 and 1921. Following the death of Senator Boies Penrose, Governor William Sproul in 1922 appointed Pepper to the United States Senate. Pepper also succeeded Penrose as Pennsylvania's Republican committeeman later that year. He was sworn in on January 22, 1922, then easily won the special election held that fall.

Senator Pepper drew national attention in 1922 by successfully mediating an anthracite coal strike. He served on the Military Affairs, Naval Affairs, and Foreign Relations committees, and became chairman of the committees on Banking and Currency and the Library of Congress. He tried to allow the United States to join the World Court but not the League of Nations, and considered this proposal one of his greatest accomplishments, including it as an appendix to his autobiography even though the proposal was later watered down.

During the public debate over the expansion of advertising in the 1920s, Senator Pepper argued for a "nationwide code of regulation," described in a 1929 speech to the Outdoor Advertising Association of America. He pointed out that in preserving natural beauty, no national economic benefit was lost—-real estate values would increase without the addition of billboards. Pepper voiced what was then the general public fear: that if billboards became mainstream, advertising would become too obtrusive.

Pepper prevailed upon President Calvin Coolidge to name fellow Pennsylvanian Owen Josephus Roberts special counsel to investigate the Teapot Dome scandal of Warren G. Harding's administration.

Pepper also drew national attention for his work (appointed by the Supreme Court) in Myers v. United States, a separation of powers case concerning the president's removal of an official without Congressional assent. He also published a collection of speeches, Men and Issues (1924).

Although favored to win his party's nomination in 1926, despite it being a three candidate race with his former client and current Governor Gifford Pinchot, Philadelphia political boss William Vare, running on an anti-Prohibition platform, defeated Pepper (who had carried 62 of the state's counties, with Pinchot running a distant third) in the 1926 primary. The Senate subsequently refused to seat Vare over allegations of overspending and fraud concerning the 1926 primary and general elections. Newly elected Governor John Stuchell Fisher appointed his political ally Joseph Grundy to fill the vacancy, and Pepper returned to his private law practice.

== Later career ==
Pepper never again sought political office, although many thought he wanted a seat on the Supreme Court. He continued as a Republican National Committeeman until 1928, then remained politically active and served on the platform committees at the 1940 and 1948 Republican National Conventions. He participated in a committee that attempted to make Philadelphia the headquarters of the United Nations in 1946, and continued his efforts to promote Christian unity. Pepper also continued as a trustee of the University of Pennsylvania and of the Carnegie Foundation for the rest of his life.

He vocally opposed President Franklin Delano Roosevelt's New Deal. Pepper was one of the counsel in United States v. Butler, in which the Supreme Court declared the Agricultural Adjustment Act unconstitutional, prompting FDR's court-packing plan. In his autobiography, Pepper noted that by prearrangement he did not receive a fee for any of his three most famous Supreme Court cases, this, the Myers and George Otis Smith cases.

Pepper also published four more books: In the Senate (1930), Family Quarrels (1931), Philadelphia Lawyer (1944), and Analytical Index to the Book of Common Prayer (1948). His autobiography, Philadelphia Lawyer, achieved critical acclaim.

== Death and legacy ==
Pepper was briefly the oldest living (former) senator. He used a wheelchair during his final years. He is buried beside his wife, Charlotte, who died a decade earlier, at St. David's Episcopal Church, Wayne, Pennsylvania, a parish in which their children and grandchildren had become active. During his final years, he donated his papers to the University of Pennsylvania, from which he had graduated and of which he had long been a trustee.

The School District of Philadelphia named a middle school for Pepper, which was closed in 2013. During its 200th anniversary celebration, the Philadelphia Bar Association named Pepper one of the legends of the Philadelphia bar. Lafayette College annually awards an academic prize named in his honor for the senior who most reflects the Lafayette ideal.

== Bibliography ==
- Lukacs, John A. (1981). Philadelphia: Patricians & Philistines, 1900-1950. New York: Farrar, Straus, Giroux. ISBN 978-0374231613. OCLC 7275297.
- Pepper, George Wharton (1944). Philadelphia Lawyer: an Autobiography. Philadelphia; New York: Lippincott. OCLC 456575.

U.S. Senate
Preceded by Boies Penrose	U.S. senator (Class 3) from Pennsylvania; 1922–1927; Served alongside: William Crow, David Reed	Succeeded by William Vare^{1}
Honorary titles
Preceded by Joe Grundy	Oldest living U.S. senator March 3, 1961 – May 24, 1961	Succeeded by Theodore Green
Party political offices
Preceded by Boies Penrose	Member of the Republican National Committee from Pennsylvania; 1922–1928	Succeeded by William Wallace Atterbury
Preceded by Boies Penrose	Republican nominee for U.S. Senator from Pennsylvania (Class 3); 1922	Succeeded by William Vare
Notes and references
1. As Senator-elect. James Davis was the next person elected and sworn-into seat.
