= 1930 United States Senate special election in Pennsylvania =

- November 4, 1930
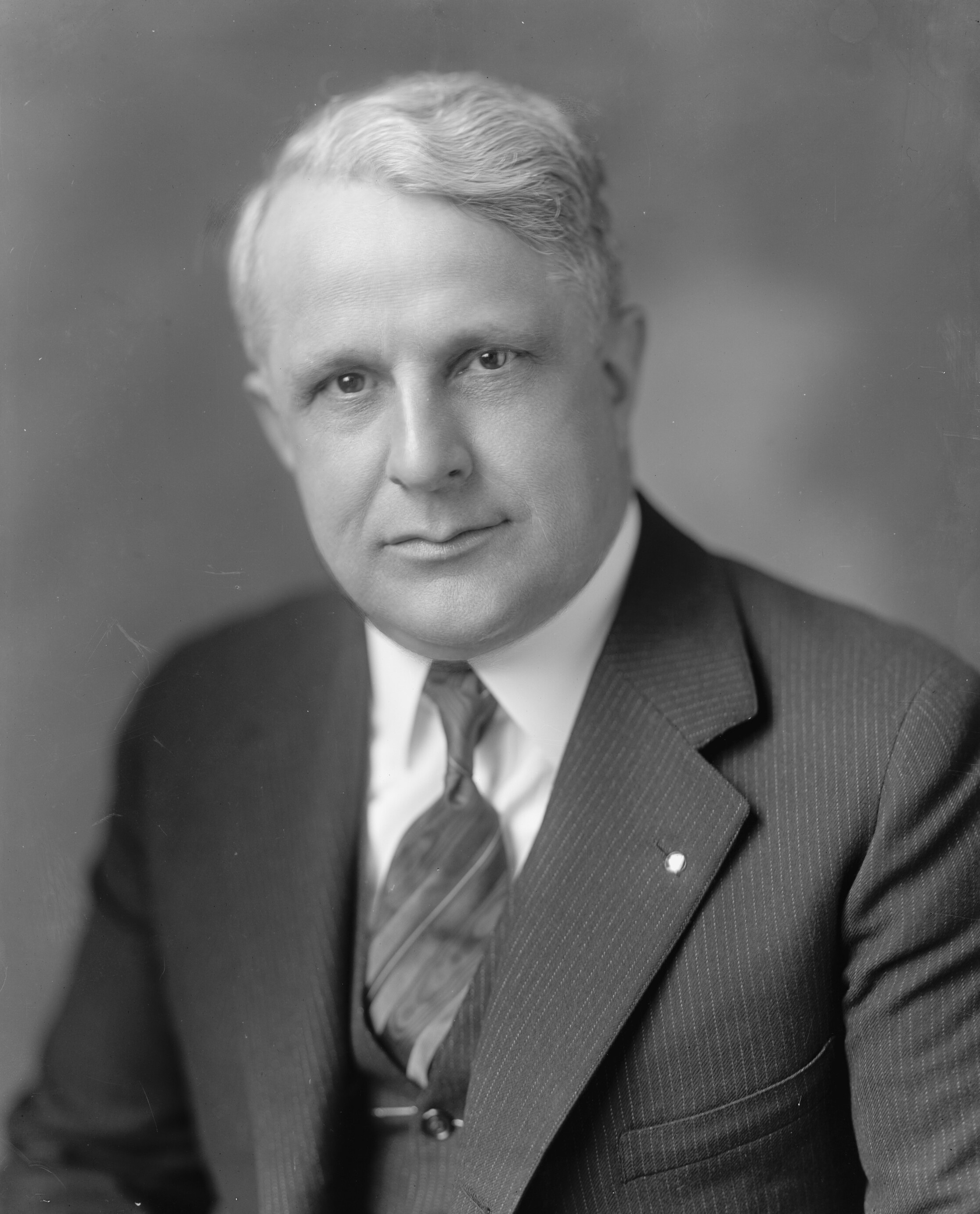

| Nominee | James J. Davis | Sedgwick Kistler |
| Party | Republican | Democratic |
| Popular vote | 1,462,186 | 523,338 |
| Percentage | 71.54% | 25.61% |
- County results Davis: 30–40% 50–60% 60–70% 70–80% 80–90% Kistler: 40–50% 50–60%
U.S. senator before election
Joseph R. Grundy
Republican
Elected U.S. Senator
James J. Davis
Republican

The 1930 United States Senate special election in Pennsylvania was held on November 4, 1930. Joseph R. Grundy, incumbent Republican appointed to fill the vacancy created by the unseating of William Scott Vare, was defeated for re-nomination. The Republican nominee, James J. Davis, defeated Democratic nominee Sedgwick Kistler to win the election.

== Republican primary ==
=== Candidates ===
- James J. Davis, incumbent United States secretary of labor
- Joseph R. Grundy, incumbent U.S. senator

== General election ==
=== Candidates ===
- S. W. Bierer (Prohibition)
- Emmett Patrick Cush (Communist)
- James J. Davis, incumbent United States Secretary of Labor (Republican)
- Sedgwick Kistler, member of the Democratic National Committee (Democratic)
- William J. Van Essen (Socialist)

=== Results ===
General election results
| Party | Candidate | Votes | % | ±% |
|---|---|---|---|---|
| Republican | James J. Davis | 1,462,186 | 71.54% | |
| Democratic | Sedgwick Kistler | 523,338 | 25.61% | |
| Socialist | William J. Van Essen | 26,796 | 1.31% | |
| Prohibition | S. W. Bierer | 24,498 | 1.20% | |
| Communist | Emmett Patrick Cush | 6,960 | 0.34% | |
| N/A | Others | 42 | 0.00% | |

== See also ==
- United States Senate elections, 1930 and 1931
