= John W. Kephart =

American judge (1872–1944)

Chief Justice of the Supreme Court of Pennsylvania
- In office 1936–1940
- Preceded by: Robert S. Frazer
- Succeeded by: William I. Schaffer

Justice of the Supreme Court of Pennsylvania
- In office 1919–1936

Personal details
- Born: November 12, 1872 Wilmore, Pennsylvania
- Died: August 6, 1944 (aged 71) Warwick, Pennsylvania
- Education: Dickinson School of Law (LL.B.)

John W. Kephart (November 12, 1872 – August 6, 1944) was a justice of the Supreme Court of Pennsylvania from 1919 to 1936 and chief justice from 1936 to 1940.

== Biography ==
John W. Kephart was born on November 12, 1872, in Wilmore, Pennsylvania, to Samuel H. and Henrietta Kephart. His father, a veteran of the American Civil War, died when John was two years old and he was enrolled in the Soldiers Orphan School in McAllisterville, Pennsylvania, graduating two years early as valedictorian of his class. He then attended Allegheny College after working as a telegraphist, but was forced to withdraw due to insufficient funds. After returning to work with the Pennsylvania Railroad to save money for his education, he enrolled at Dickinson School of Law and graduated in 1894. He was a member of Phi Gamma Delta, joining in 1891.

In 1913, after practicing law for several years and becoming Cambria County Solicitor, Kephart was elected to the Superior Court of Pennsylvania without the support of any major party in a race that attracted national attention. He was subsequently elected to the Supreme Court of Pennsylvania in 1918, serving as an associate justice from 1919 until 1936, when he became chief justice. He served as chief justice until his retirement from the court in January 1940. Kephart died on August 6, 1944, in Warwick, Pennsylvania.
