= George W. Maxey =

American judge (1878–1950)

Chief Justice of the Supreme Court of Pennsylvania
- In office 1943–1950
- Preceded by: William I. Schaffer
- Succeeded by: James B. Drew

Justice of the Supreme Court of Pennsylvania
- In office 1930–1943

Personal details
- Born: February 14, 1878 Forest City, Pennsylvania
- Died: March 20, 1950 (aged 72) Pittsburgh, Pennsylvania
- Spouse: Lillian Danvers
- Education: University of Michigan (B.A.); University of Pennsylvania (LL.B.)

George Wendell Maxey (February 14, 1878 – March 20, 1950) was a justice of the Supreme Court of Pennsylvania from 1930 to 1943 and chief justice from 1943 to 1950.

== Biography ==
Maxey was born on February 14, 1878, in Forest City, Pennsylvania. He worked in coal mines and studied at the Mansfield State Normal School before attending the University of Michigan, graduating with a B.A. degree in 1902. He subsequently earned a law degree from the University of Pennsylvania Law School. He took and passed the Pennsylvania bar, gaining admission to practice in March 1906.

After his admission to the bar, Maxey practiced law until his election as District Attorney of Lackawanna County, Pennsylvania, in 1913. He was re-elected in 1917 and was subsequently elected to a ten-year term as judge in Pennsylvania's 45th judicial district. After his re-election as judge, Maxey was elected to the Pennsylvania Supreme Court in 1930 and served as an associate justice until becoming chief justice in 1943. He served as chief justice of the Supreme Court of Pennsylvania until his death, a few months after the beginning of a session of the court, in March 1950.
