= Robert S. Frazer =

American judge (1849–1936)

Chief Justice of the Supreme Court of Pennsylvania
- In office 1930–1936
- Preceded by: Robert von Moschzisker
- Succeeded by: John W. Kephart

Justice of the Supreme Court of Pennsylvania
- In office 1915–1930

Personal details
- Born: September 18, 1849 Fayette City, Pennsylvania
- Died: July 31, 1936 (aged 86) Pittsburgh, Pennsylvania
- Party: Republican
- Spouse: Loretta Gilfillan
- Education: Western University of Pennsylvania

Robert Sellers Frazer (September 18, 1849 – July 31, 1936) was a justice of the Supreme Court of Pennsylvania from 1915 to 1930 and chief justice from 1930 to 1936.

== Biography ==
Robert S. Frazer was born on September 18, 1849, in Fayette City, Pennsylvania, to Caleb and Sarah Baker Frazer. Early in his childhood, he moved with his family to Johnstown, Pennsylvania. He attended the Western University of Pennsylvania in Pittsburgh and studied law. He served in the Pennsylvania House of Representatives as a Republican from 1877 to 1879 and entered private law practice until being elected to the Allegheny County Court of Common Pleas in 1896. He was re-elected as judge of the Court of Common Pleas in 1906 after becoming president judge on November 5, 1900.

Frazer served on the Allegheny County Court of Common Pleas until his election to the Supreme Court of Pennsylvania in 1914. He served as an associate justice from 1915 to 1930, before becoming chief justice in 1930, serving until 1936. He died on July 31, 1936, in Pittsburgh, Pennsylvania.

Frazer held honorary LL.D. degrees from the University of Pittsburgh, Lafayette College and Temple University. He also served as president of the Elizabeth Steel Magee Hospital, a position he held at the time of his death.
