= William I. Schaffer =

American judge

William Irwin Schaffer
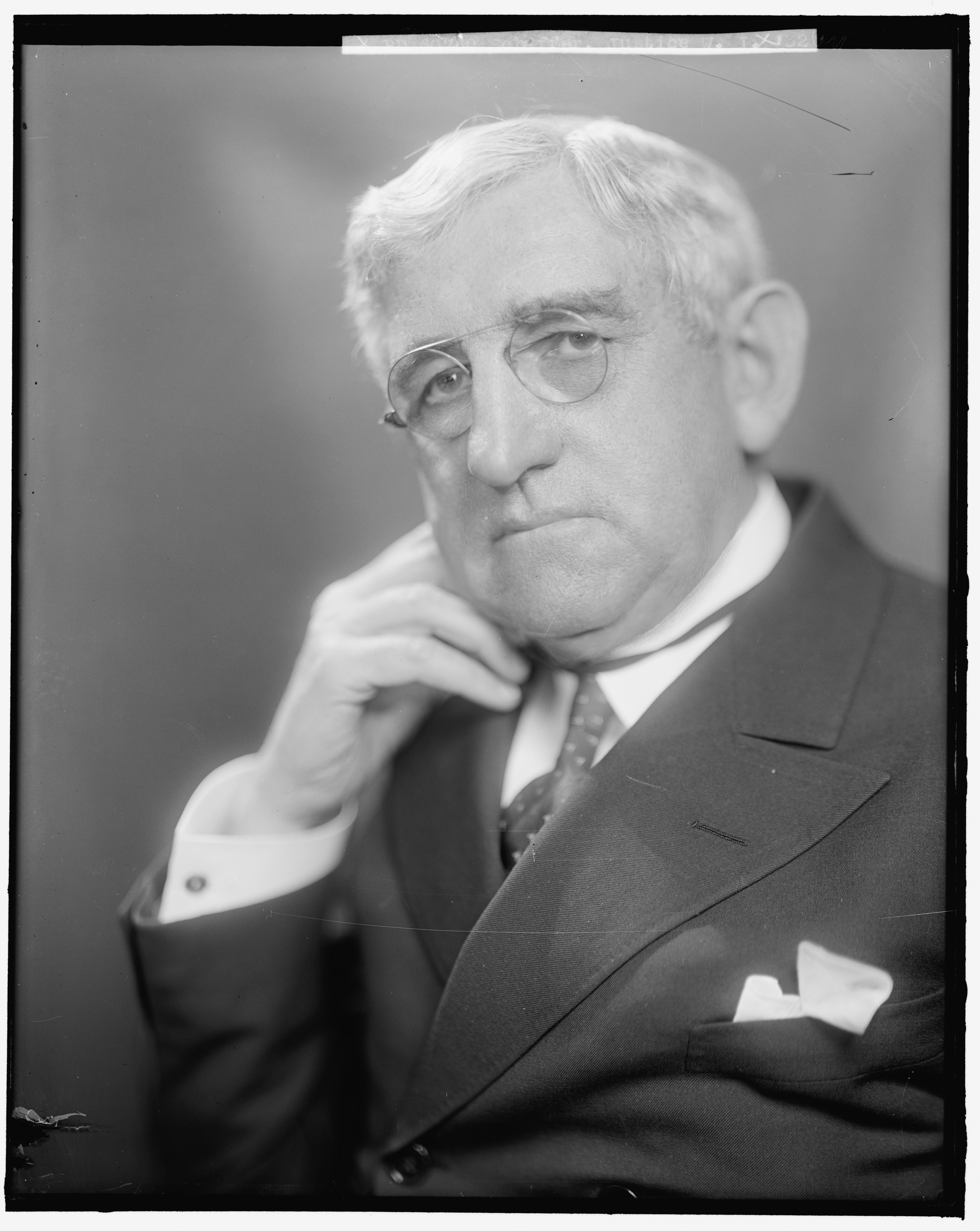
- c. 1919 photograph

Chief Justice of the Supreme Court of Pennsylvania
- In office January 2, 1940 – January 4, 1943
- Preceded by: John W. Kephart
- Succeeded by: George W. Maxey

Associate Justice of the Supreme Court of Pennsylvania
- In office December 14, 1920 – January 2, 1940
- Preceded by: John Stewart
- Succeeded by: Marion D. Patterson

Attorney General of Pennsylvania
- In office January 21, 1919 – December 14, 1920
- Governor: William Cameron Sproul
- Preceded by: Francis Shunk Brown
- Succeeded by: George E. Alter

Personal details
- Born: February 11, 1867 Germantown, Philadelphia, Pennsylvania, U.S.
- Died: January 15, 1953 (aged 85) Belleair, Florida, U.S.
- Party: Republican
- Spouse: Susan Ashley Cross
- Occupation: Judge, lawyer
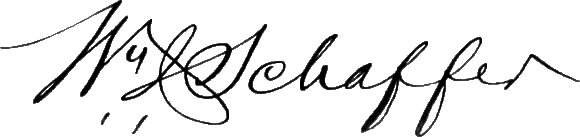
- Signature

William Irwin Schaffer (February 11, 1867 – January 15, 1953) was an American lawyer and judge from Pennsylvania. He served briefly as the state's Attorney General, resigning to serve on the state's Supreme Court for over twenty years, including three years as chief justice.

== Life and career ==
Schaffer was the son of George Alfred and Mary Henrietta Irwin Schaffer. His maternal grandfather, William H. Irwin, had served as Adjutant General of the state. Schaffer grew up in Chester, Pennsylvania. He left school at age fifteen, finding odd jobs, ending up as an assistant in a law office, where he learned law. He was admitted to the bar of Delaware County in 1888 on his 21st birthday, the legal minimum.

He served two terms as District Attorney for Delaware County. He was active in Republican politics, and was appointed by Governor William Cameron Sproul, first as Attorney General, and then to fill a vacancy on the state Supreme Court. He then won election to a 21-year term on the Court. He was elevated to Chief Justice based on seniority in 1940. He was a member of the Five O'Clock Club of Philadelphia.

After retiring from the Court, he returned to private practice, living in Haverford. During his final illness, he stayed in Florida, where he died. He is buried at West Laurel Hill Cemetery in Bala Cynwyd, Hanover Section, Lot 26.

== Notable cases ==
Schaffer wrote the majority opinion in the 1927 case deciding that Sunday baseball was in violation of the state's 1794 "blue laws".

== Controversies ==
Schaffer was identified, along with Justice John W. Kephart, in a Senate Banking Committee investigation, as being on a J.P. Morgan & Co. "preferred" list, allowing them steeply discounted prices for the purchase of certain securities. Governor Pinchot asked the two justices to resign. The judges denied any impropriety.

Legal offices
Preceded by Francis Shunk Brown	Attorney General of Pennsylvania; 1919–1920	Succeeded by George E. Alter
Preceded by John W. Kephart	Chief Justice of the Pennsylvania Supreme Court; 1940–1943	Succeeded by George W. Maxey
