= George Washington Woodruff =

American football coach and judge (1864–1934)

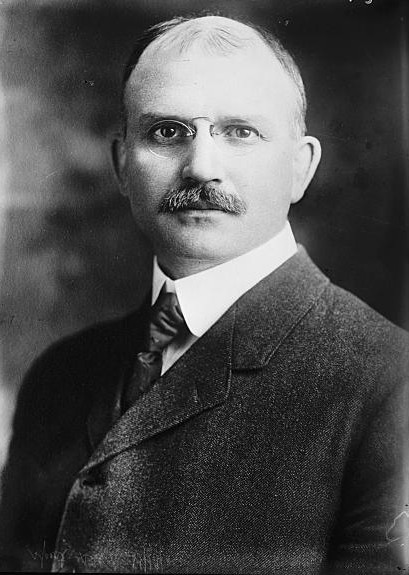

Biographical details
- Born: February 22, 1864; Dimock, Pennsylvania, U.S.
- Died: March 23, 1934 (aged 70); Harrisburg, Pennsylvania, U.S.
- Education: Yale University; University of Pennsylvania School of Law

Playing career

Football
- 1885–1888: Yale
- 1892–1895: Penn
- Position: Guard

Coaching career (HC unless noted)

Football
- 1892–1901: Penn
- 1903: Illinois
- 1905: Carlisle

Rowing
- 1892–1895: Penn

Head coaching record
- Overall: 142–25–2 (football)

Accomplishments and honors

Championships
- 3 national (1894–1895, 1897)
- College Football Hall of Fame; Inducted in 1963 (profile)

Attorney General of Pennsylvania
- In office January 20, 1923 – January 18, 1927
- Governor: Gifford Pinchot
- Preceded by: George E. Alter
- Succeeded by: Thomas J. Baldrige

Judge of the United States District Court for the Territory of Hawaii
- In office 1909–1910
- Preceded by: Seat established by 60 Stat. 322
- Succeeded by: Alexander George Morison Robertson

Personal details
- Party: Republican

George Washington Woodruff (February 22, 1864 – March 23, 1934) was an American college football player, rower, coach, teacher, lawyer and politician. He served as the head football coach at the University of Pennsylvania (1892–1901), the University of Illinois (1903), and Carlisle Indian Industrial School (1905), compiling a career college football record of 142–25–2. Woodruff's Penn teams of 1894, 1895, and 1897 have been recognized as national champions. Woodruff was inducted into the College Football Hall of Fame as a coach in 1963.

== Playing career and education ==
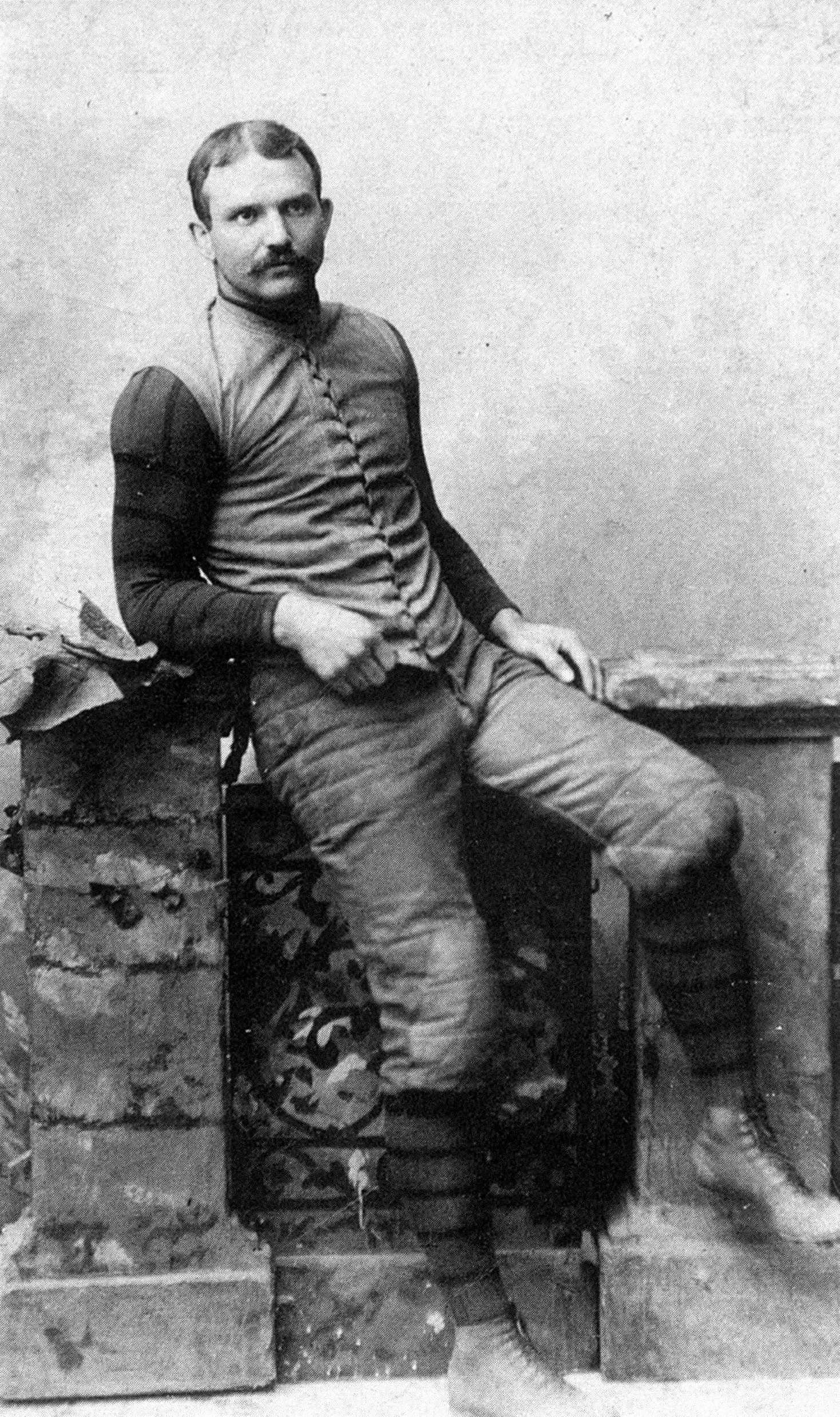
Penn, 1898

Woodruff graduated from Yale University in 1889, where he was a member of Skull and Bones, and the University of Pennsylvania School of Law, where he earned his LL.B. law degree in 1895. His football teammates at Yale included Amos Alonzo Stagg, Pudge Heffelfinger, and Pa Corbin.

== Coaching career ==
At Penn, Woodruff coached Truxtun Hare, Carl Sheldon Williams, John H. Outland, his brother Wylie G. Woodruff, and Charles Gelbert. In his ten years of coaching at Penn, Woodruff compiled a 124–15–2 record while his teams scored 1777 points and only gave up 88. He also coached one year each at the University of Illinois at Urbana–Champaign and Carlisle Indian Industrial School.

== Political career ==
After coaching, Woodruff practiced law and was active in politics as a Republican. His political posts included Finance Clerk in Philadelphia, Pennsylvania Attorney General, federal judge for the territory of Hawaii, chief law officer of the United States Forest Service under friend and fellow Yale alumni Gifford Pinchot, and acting Secretary of the Interior under President Theodore Roosevelt.

== Family and death ==
Woodruff was married in 1898, to Maude Donald McBride, of Philadelphia, who died in 1918. He was married a second time, in 1921, to Elfreda Foster, of Harrisburg, Pennsylvania. Woodruff died on March 23, 1934, in Harrisburg, after suffering from pleurisy.

== Head coaching record ==
=== Football ===
Year	Team	Overall	Conference	Standing	Bowl/playoffs
Penn Quakers (Independent) (1892–1901)
1892	Penn	15–1			
1893	Penn	12–3			
1894	Penn	12–0			
1895	Penn	14–0			
1896	Penn	14–1			
1897	Penn	15–0			
1898	Penn	12–1			
1899	Penn	8–3–2			
1900	Penn	12–1			
1901	Penn	10–5			
Penn:		124–15–2			
Illinois Fighting Illini (Western Conference) (1903)
1903	Illinois	8–6	1–5	7th	
Illinois:		8–6	1–5		
Carlisle Indians (Independent) (1905)
1905	Carlisle	10–4			
Carlisle:		10–4			
Total:		142–25–2			
National championship Conference title Conference division title or championship game berth

Note: Before 1936, national champions were determined by historical research and retroactive ratings and polls.
1894 Poll Results = Penn: Parke H. Davis, Princeton: Houlgate, Yale: Billingsley, Helms, National Championship Foundation, Parke H. Davis
1895 Poll Results = Penn: Billingsley, Helms, Houlgate, National Championship Foundation, Parke H. Davis, Yale: Parke H. Davis
1897 Poll Results = Penn: Billingsley, Helms, Houlgate, National Championship Foundation, Parke H. Davis, Yale: Parke H. Davis
George Woodruff's last game as a coach was the 1905 Carlisle-Army game after which he went to Washington for a government job. Ralph Kinney completed Carlisle's season, going 3–2 over the five games played after Woodruff's departure.

Political offices
Preceded by George Alter	Pennsylvania Attorney General; 1923–1927	Succeeded by Thomas Baldrige
Legal offices
Preceded by Seat established by 60 Stat. 322	United States District Court Judge; 1909–1910	Succeeded by Alexander George Morison Robertson
