= Francis Shunk Brown =

American lawyer

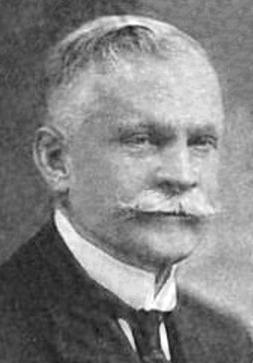

Pennsylvania Attorney General
- In office January 19, 1915 – January 21, 1919
- Governor: Martin Grove Brumbaugh
- Preceded by: John C. Bell
- Succeeded by: William I. Schaffer

Personal details
- Born: June 9, 1858; Philadelphia, Pennsylvania, US
- Died: May 6, 1940 (aged 81); Overbrook, Pennsylvania, US
- Spouse: Elizabeth Hamm
- Children: 2

Francis Shunk Brown (June 9, 1858 – May 6, 1940) was an American lawyer from Pennsylvania who served one term as Pennsylvania Attorney General from 1915 to 1919 and ran unsuccessfully in the Republican primary for Governor in 1930.

== Ancestry ==
Brown's father was Charles Brown, who served two terms in the U.S. Congress as a Pennsylvania representative before Brown was born. Brown's mother was Elizabeth Shunk. Her father was former state governor Francis R. Shunk and her maternal grandfather was former state governor William Findlay.

== Early life and education ==
The family moved to Delaware when Brown was still very young. Brown attended schools in Philadelphia and Delaware. He graduated from the University of Pennsylvania Law School in 1879. He was admitted to the bar immediately. Brown was a member of the Five O'Clock Club of Philadelphia.

== Career ==
His law practice clients included many Pennsylvania politicians Israel Wilson Durham, Boies Penrose, and the William Scott Vare.

In 1915, he was appointed state Attorney General and served until 1919. After completing his term, he returned to private practice.

=== 1930 Republican primary for governor ===
In 1930, he was persuaded by state Republican party leaders including William Scott Vare to run in the primary against former state governor Gifford Pinchot. Ending Prohibition was the dominant issue, and in public Brown took a lukewarm position, favoring a state referendum to consider modifying the Volstead Act. In private, he supported repeal but could not come out in public against prohibition due to his political connections to President Herbert Hoover. One minor contender, Thomas Wharton Phillips Jr. was openly anti prohibition. Pinchot was a prohibitionist who in his previous term as governor did almost nothing to enforce Prohibition, and so ended up attracting strong anti-prohibition support against Brown and Phillips, winning the primary by 20,000 votes over Brown, and later the state election.

During the primary, in contrast to the other candidates (Gifford Pinchot, Thomas Wharton Phillips Jr., Joseph R. Grundy), Brown declined to take part in an open discussion about Republican issues sponsored by the Pennsylvania League of Woman Voters because they invited Joseph D. Herben, a Negro candidate. He stated: "I refuse to discuss state politics on the same platform with a Negro."

== Personal life ==
In 1883, he married Elizabeth Hamm. They had two children, one son and one daughter. The son, Francis Shunk Brown Jr., would serve as a judge of the Court of Common Pleas.

Brown was an avid yachtsman, and served as commodore of the Philadelphia Yacht Club. He owned and worked part-time on a farm on the Eastern Shore of the Chesapeake Bay. He once owned a camp along Lake Placid.

Legal offices
Preceded by John C. Bell	Pennsylvania Attorney General; 1915–1919	Succeeded by William I. Schaffer
