= Five O'Clock Club of Philadelphia =

Men's social dining club

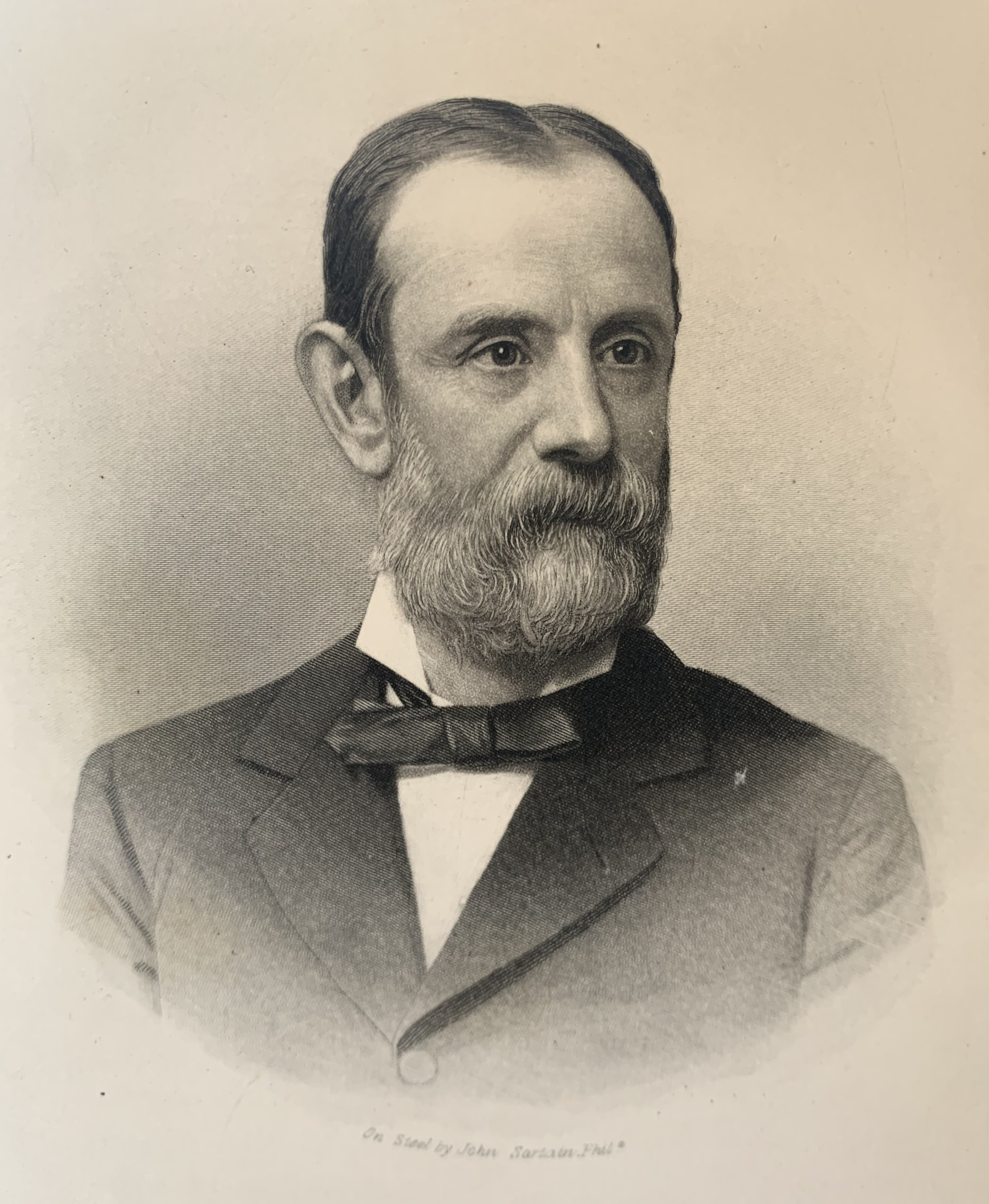
Mark Richards Muckle, founding member of the Five O'Clock Club

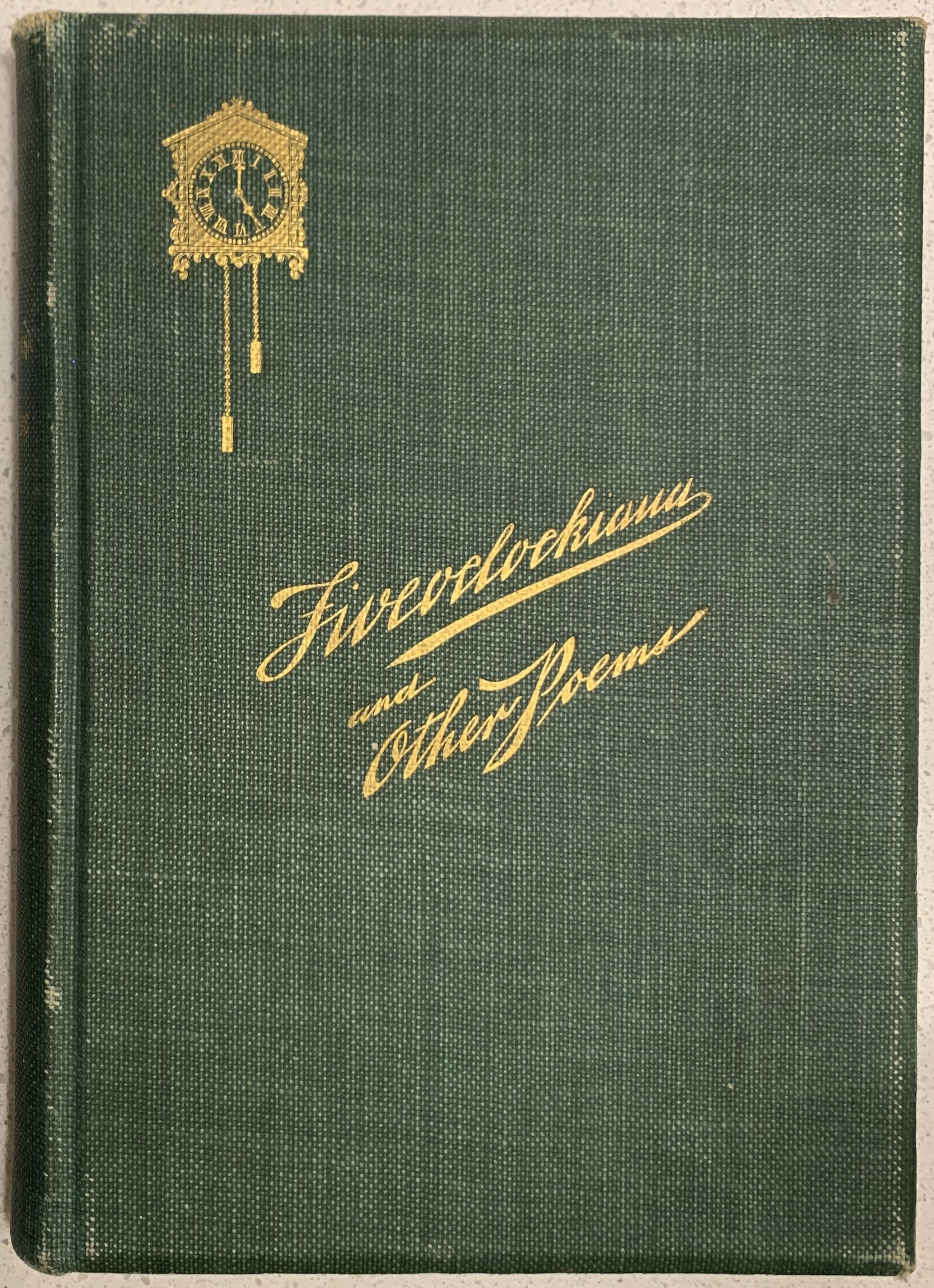
Fiveoclockiana and Other Poems, by J. Hampton Moore. A souvenir of the 15th anniversary of the Five O'Clock Club. Privately published in Philadelphia in 1898.

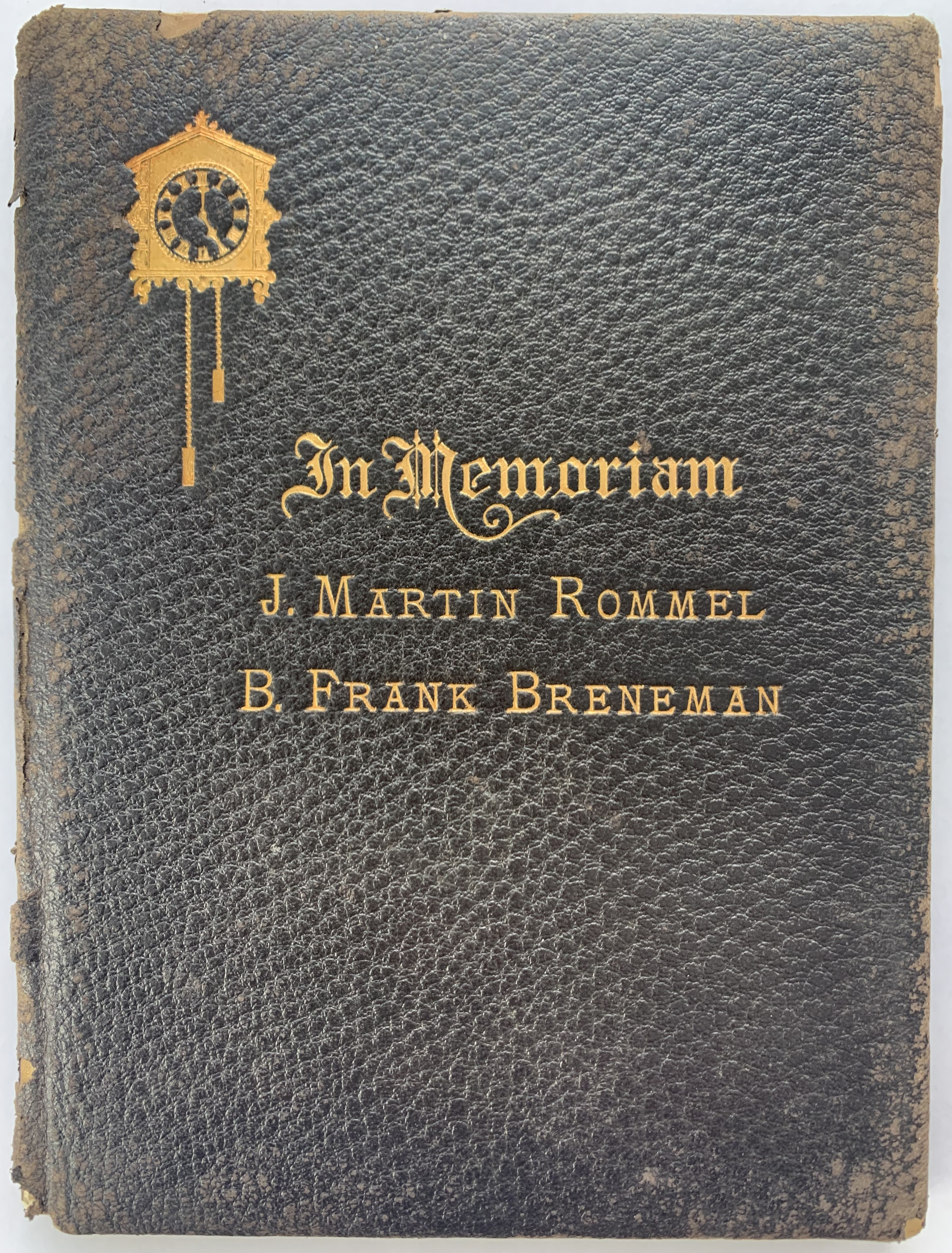
In Memoriam: J. Martin Rommel and B. Frank Breneman. A volume published in 1906 by the Five O'Clock Club upon the death of two members.

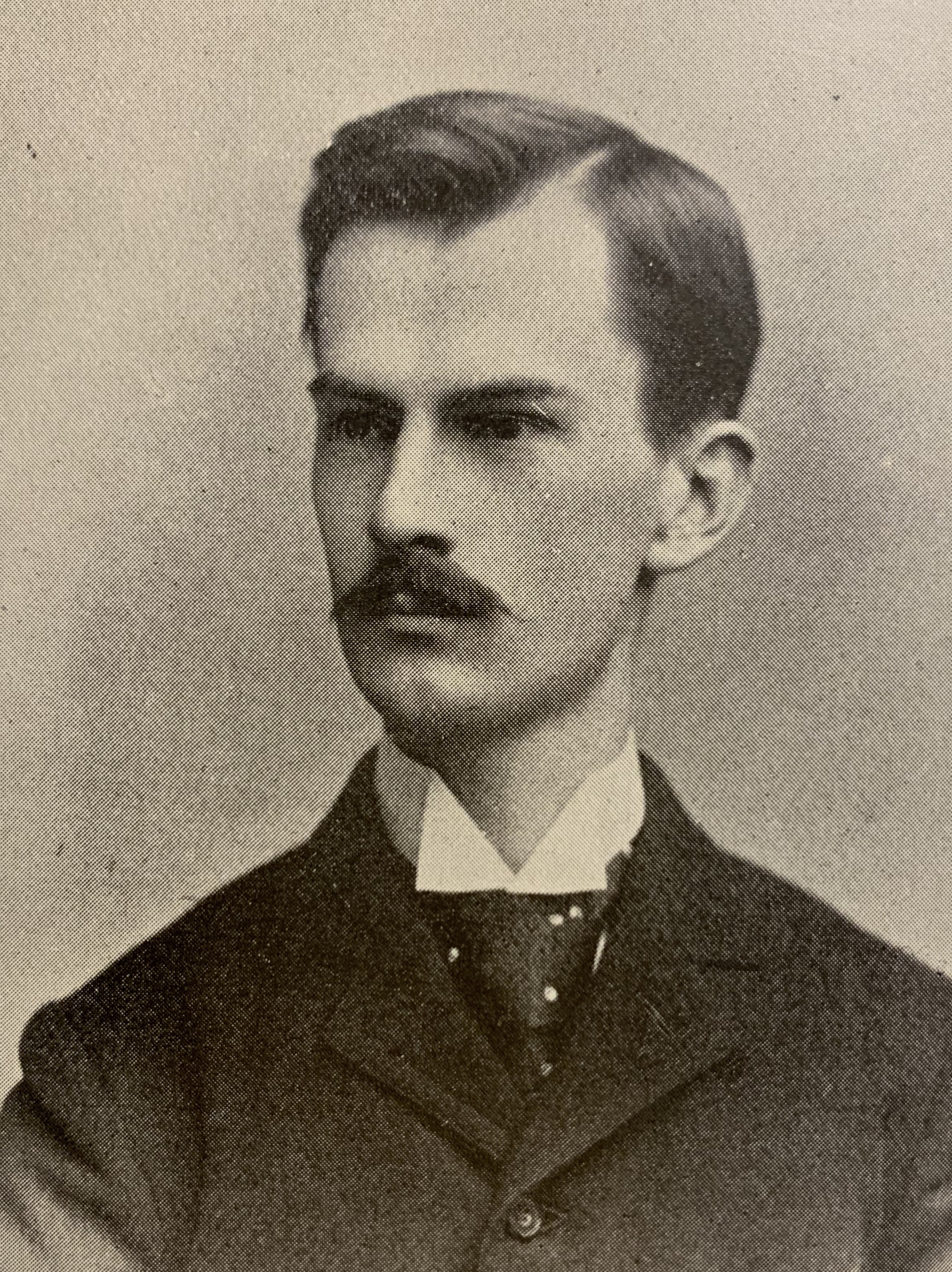
J. Hampton Moore in 1891. Moore was a two-term Philadelphia Mayor as well as a 50-year member and long-time secretary of the Five O'Clock Club.

The Five O'Clock Club of Philadelphia was a social dining club founded by a group of prominent Philadelphia business and government leaders in 1883. With 35 members, the club had no building of its own, but organized dinners, banquets, and other entertainments at other clubs and hotels in Philadelphia. While the club was created by newspaper men, among its members were local Republican politicians, including Philadelphia Mayor Charles F. Warwick, Philadelphia Mayor and US Congressman J. Hampton Moore, Pennsylvania Attorney General Francis Shunk Brown, Pennsylvania Attorney General F. Carroll Brewster, Pennsylvania Supreme Court Justice William I. Schaffer, US Congressman Robert H. Foerderer, and US Senator Joseph R. Grundy.

In its early days, the club met on the second Saturday of each month, taking the summer months off. The Bellevue-Stratford Hotel, the Manufacturers' Club and the Union League of Philadelphia were frequently the scene of Five O'Clock Club meetings. The club was the successor of the short-lived Thursday Club and was launched within days of the folding of that club, and was a main competitor to the similarly organized Clover Club of Philadelphia, which survived the Five O'Clock Club. The Five O'Clock Club was dissolved in 1937.

== Beginnings ==
The club was conceived in the business office of George William Childs, owner of the Philadelphia Public Ledger newspaper. In January 1883, Childs issued a call for a meeting to organize a new club to replace the defunct Thursday Club. The following month, in room 20 of the Public Ledger building, a number of men met and organized the new society. Newspaper men were the majority. Among those present were M. Richards Muckle, Joel Cook, Israel F. Sheppard, Robert M. McWade, Frank Smith, and James H. Alexander, all connected with the Public Ledger. Also present were W. H. C. Hargrave, John M. Perry, James R. Wood, George W. Boyd, Robert C. Clipperton, John L. Carncross, Henry R. Edmunds, and Charles Lawrence. The first officers of the club were Captain Robert C. Clipperton, the British Consul in Philadelphia, as president; Joel Cook, of the Philadelphia Public Ledger, as vice president; and Frank Smith, also of the Philadelphia Public Ledger, as secretary.

== Meetings ==
Meetings of the Five O'Clock Club were marked both by their informality -- meeting at 5:00 p.m. meant gentlemen were not required to wear formal clothes -- and by their wit. Distinguished guests were typically present at meetings and the evening's entertainment consisted of speeches, songs, declamations, and witty banter. It was at an 1899 meeting of the Five O'Clock Club that the state of Missouri came to be known as the "Show-Me-State." Rep. Willard Duncan Vandiver (D., Mo.) commented, "I come from a State that raises corn and cotton and cockleburs and Democrats, and frothy eloquence neither convinces nor satisfies me. I am from Missouri. You have got to show me."

== Ending ==
Fifty-four years after its founding, the 10 remaining members of the Five O'Clock Club decided to disband the organization. The final dinner meeting of the organization happened on Thursday, October 14, 1937, at the Art Alliance, in Philadelphia. One week later, the club held their final meeting, a luncheon meeting, the first in its history, with 36 guests, at the Bellevue-Stratford Hotel's Clover Room on Thursday, October 21, 1937. The final menu was oysters, green turtle soup, roast turkey and Nesselrode pudding and the final toast was "Old days, old times, old friends." Present at the final meeting were Col. Louis J. Kolb, president; J. Hampton Moore, secretary-treasurer; Joseph R. Grundy, Francis Shunk Brown, John Kent Kane, Edward T. Stotesbury, J. S. W. Holton, Judge William I. Schaffer, Henry W. Moore, and Joseph Wayne, Jr.

== Members ==
- W. M. Barrett.
- J. W. B. Bausman.
- James M. Beck.
- Judge Teter Dimner Beeber (1854–1930).
- Judge Abraham M. Beitler (1853–1935).
- Mayor Rudolph Blankenburg (1843–1918).
- Charles H. Bower.
- George W. Boyd. Founding member.
- Benjamin Franklin Breneman (1837–1905).
- F. Carroll Brewster, LL.D. (1825–1898). Honorary Member.
- Francis Shunk Brown (1858–1940).
- Dr. Martin G. Brumbaugh.
- Judge William Wilkins Carr (1853–1919).
- Colonel Alexander Purves Colesberry (1836–1916).
- David F. Conover.
- John H. Cook.
- Joseph Culbert (b. 1837).
- Alva C. Dinkey.
- Samuel Disston.
- James Doak, Jr. (1837–1916).
- Thomas Dolan.
- John T. Donnelly (1825–1883). Founding member.
- Henry R. Edmunds. Founding member.
- Francis Fenimore (1840–1909).
- James McIntyre Ferguson (1833–1885). Founding member.
- Robert Hermann Foerderer (1860–1903).
- H. E. Garsed.
- W. W. Gibbs.
- George S. Graham. Founding member.
- Colonel John Gribbel.
- Henry B. Gross (b. 1849).
- Senator Joseph R. Grundy (1863–1961).
- Franklin M. Harris.
- William F. Harrity.
- Major William H. Hastings.
- J. S. W. Holton.
- John F. Hope.
- Joseph M. Huston.
- Ellery P. Ingham.
- Joshua R. Jones.
- John Kent Kane.
- Murdock Kendrick (b. 1873).
- John L. Kinsey.
- Colonel Louis J. Kolb.
- Charles Lawrence.
- W. R. Lebrenz.
- William E. Littleton (1838–1902).
- William Brasher MacKellar (1844–1897).
- Charles R. Mackenzie.
- David B. Martin.
- Joseph B. McCall.
- Henry Jefferson McCarthy (1845–1903).
- Henry C. McCormick.
- William T. McNeely.
- Robert M. McWade.
- Mayor Joseph Hampton Moore (1864–1950).
- Henry W. Moore.
- D. W. Morey.
- Edward Morrell.
- Colonel Mark Richards Muckle (1825–1915).
- Simon Muhr (1845–1895).
- John Mundell, Jr. (1860–1933)
- Richard G. Oellers.
- John B. Parsons.
- Abraham Storm Patterson (1850–1898).
- C. Stuart Patterson.
- Horace Pettit.
- James Pollock.
- Charles A. Porter.
- E. T. Postlethwaite. Founding member.
- William A. Redding.
- Max Riebenack.
- J. Morton Riggs.
- Commander Frederick Rodgers, USN. Founding member.
- Jacob Martin Rommel (1867–1905).
- William J. Roney.
- Allen B. Rorke.
- Dallas Sanders.
- William Henry Sayen (1846–1921).
- Judge William I. Schaffer.
- Frank Smith.
- Franklin Smith (b. 1842). Founding member.
- William M. Smith.
- A. Loudon Snowden (1835 – 1912). American politician, register of the United States Mint in 1857, chief coiner and superintendent of the Philadelphia Mint. In 1879, he became the Chief Executor in the Philadelphia Mint.
- Isaac N. Solis.
- Judge William H. Staake (1846–1924).
- John S. Stevens.
- Robert Stewart.
- Henry S. Stiles.
- Harry T. Stoddart.
- Edward T. Stotesbury (1849–1938).
- George Thompson.
- R. W. Alban Thompson.
- Thomas M. Thompson.
- Harry Clay Trexler (1854–1933).
- Joseph P. Truitt.
- Benjamin A. Van Schaick (1842–1900).
- Fred M. Walton.
- Hon. Henry Foster Walton (1858–1921). Founding member.
- Mayor Charles F. Warwick (1853–1913).
- Joseph Wayne, Jr.
- George B. White. Commander USN. Founding member.
- Benjamin P. Wilson.
- James R. Wood. Founding member.
- J. Fred Zimmerman. Founding member.

== Bibliography ==
While the members of The Five O'Clock Club have many publications to their credit, the Club itself is responsible for a few books.

- History of the Five O’Clock Club of Philadelphia, Its Guests and Methods of Entertainment with Sketches and Portraits of its Members, by J. Hampton Moore, May 1, 1891. [Philadelphia: Times Printing House, 1891].
- Fiveoclockiana : souvenir of the 9th anniversary dinner of the Five O'Clock Club of Philadelphia. [Philadelphia: n.p., 1892].
- The Oracle : souvenir of the Five o'clock club of Philadelphia, thirteenth anniversary dinner, Saturday, February 29, 1896. [Philadelphia: Dreka, 1896].
- Fiveoclockiana & other poems; being a collection of original verses & songs prompted by current events, for the menus, souvenirs & dinners of the Five o'clock club of Philadelphia. [Philadelphia, Dreka, 1898].
- Five O'clock Club, Philadelphia : 16th anniversary (1883–1899). [Philadelphia: Five O’ Clock Club, 1899].
- In memoriam. Henry J. McCarthy, Robert H. Foerderer. [Wayne, Pa.: Suburban publishing co., 1903].
- In Memoriam: J. Martin Rommel, B. Frank Breneman. [n.p.: n.p., 1906]
