= George E. Alter =

American politician and attorney

George Elias Alter
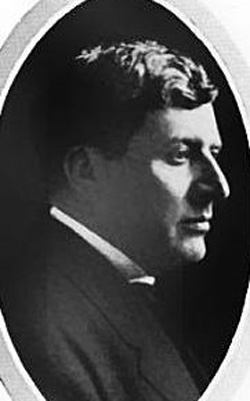
- c. 1922 photograph

Attorney General of Pennsylvania
- In office December 14, 1920 – January 16, 1923
- Governor: William Cameron Sproul
- Preceded by: William I. Schaffer
- Succeeded by: George Washington Woodruff

Personal details
- Born: May 8, 1868 Springdale, Allegheny County, Pennsylvania
- Died: August 18, 1940 (aged 71) Pittsburgh, Pennsylvania
- Party: Republican
- Spouse: Diana J. Swanton
- Children: 4

George Elias Alter (May 8, 1868 – August 18, 1940) was an American lawyer and politician, who served one term as attorney general of the Commonwealth of Pennsylvania.

== Formative years and family ==
Born in Springdale, Pennsylvania on May 8, 1868, George Elias Alter was a son of Elias Alter, a carpenter, and Martha Ferson Alter. His father was active in local school politics; his aunt, Susanna Alter, was the wife of former Pennsylvania governor Joseph Ritner.

Educated in his community's public schools, George E. Alter subsequently studied law, and, in 1893, was admitted to the bar.

In 1902, he married Diana J. Swanton, with whom he had four children.

== Political career ==
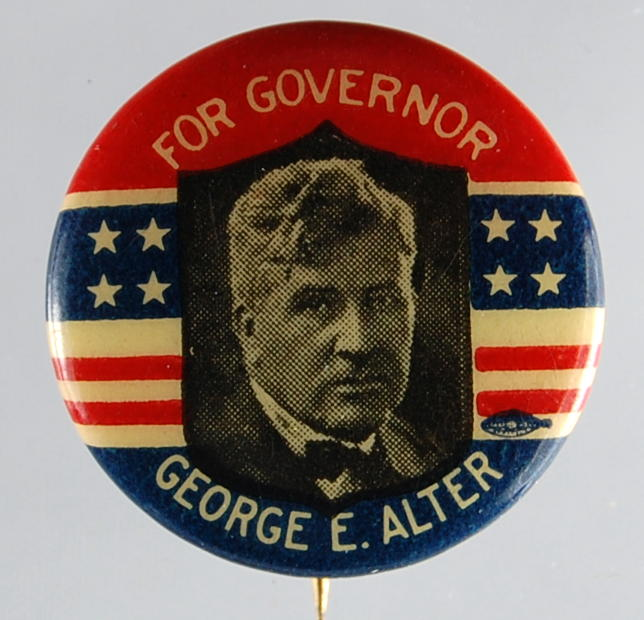
Gubernatorial campaign button of George Alter, 1922

Like his father before him, George Alter became involved in local school politics; he was then elected to three terms in the Pennsylvania House of Representatives: 1908, 1910, 1912. From 1913 to 1914, he served as Speaker of the House.

Late in 1920, Alter was appointed as Pennsylvania's attorney general, replacing William I. Schaffer, who had been appointed to the Pennsylvania Supreme Court. In 1922, while serving as attorney general, Alter campaigned to become governor, and with the backing of the party, was expected to win the Republican nomination; however, he was defeated during a close election by Gifford Pinchot, a loss that was due, in part, to a strong showing among women voters.

From 1924 to 1925, Alter served as president of the Pennsylvania Bar Association. From 1927 to 1932, he was a member of a commission on uniform State laws.

== Death ==
Alter died in Pittsburgh, Pennsylvania on August 18, 1940.

Legal offices
Preceded by William I. Schaffer	Pennsylvania Attorney General; 1920–1923	Succeeded by George Washington Woodruff
