= Flora M. Vare =

American politician

Member of the Pennsylvania Senate from the 1st district
- In office 1925–1928
- Preceded by: William Scott Vare
- Succeeded by: Lawrence E. McCrossin

Personal details
- Born: July 26, 1873 New London, Connecticut, U.S.
- Died: May 27, 1962 (aged 88) Lower Merion Township, Pennsylvania, U.S.
- Resting place: West Laurel Hill Cemetery, Bala Cynwyd, Pennsylvania, U.S.
- Party: Republican
- Spouse: Edwin Vare

Flora Morris Vare (July 26, 1873 – May 27, 1962) was an American politician from Pennsylvania who served as a Republican member of the Pennsylvania Senate for the 1st District from 1925 to 1928. She was married to Edwin Vare; he and his brothers William Scott Vare and George Vare were known as the "Dukes of South Philadelphia" for their decades-long political control of the South Philadelphia ward leadership. She was the first woman to serve in the Pennsylvania Senate.

== Early life ==
Vare was born in New London, Connecticut.

== Career ==
Vare was elected to the Pennsylvania State Senate representing the 1st Senatorial District for the seat vacated by her brother in law William Scott Vare and served from 1925 to 1928.

She proposed legislation for a Pennsylvania constitutional amendment to provide everyone over the age of 65 with a dollar a day pension, however the legislation was not passed.

She lost reelection to Lawrence E. McCrossin and the state senate seat that had been held by a member of the Vare family since 1894.

She died in Lankenau Medical Center and was interred at the West Laurel Hill Cemetery in Bala Cynwyd, Pennsylvania.

== Personal life ==
Flora was married to Edwin Vare and her sister Ida Morris was married to Edwin's brother, William Scott Vare.
