= 1938 United States Senate election in Pennsylvania =

- November 8, 1938
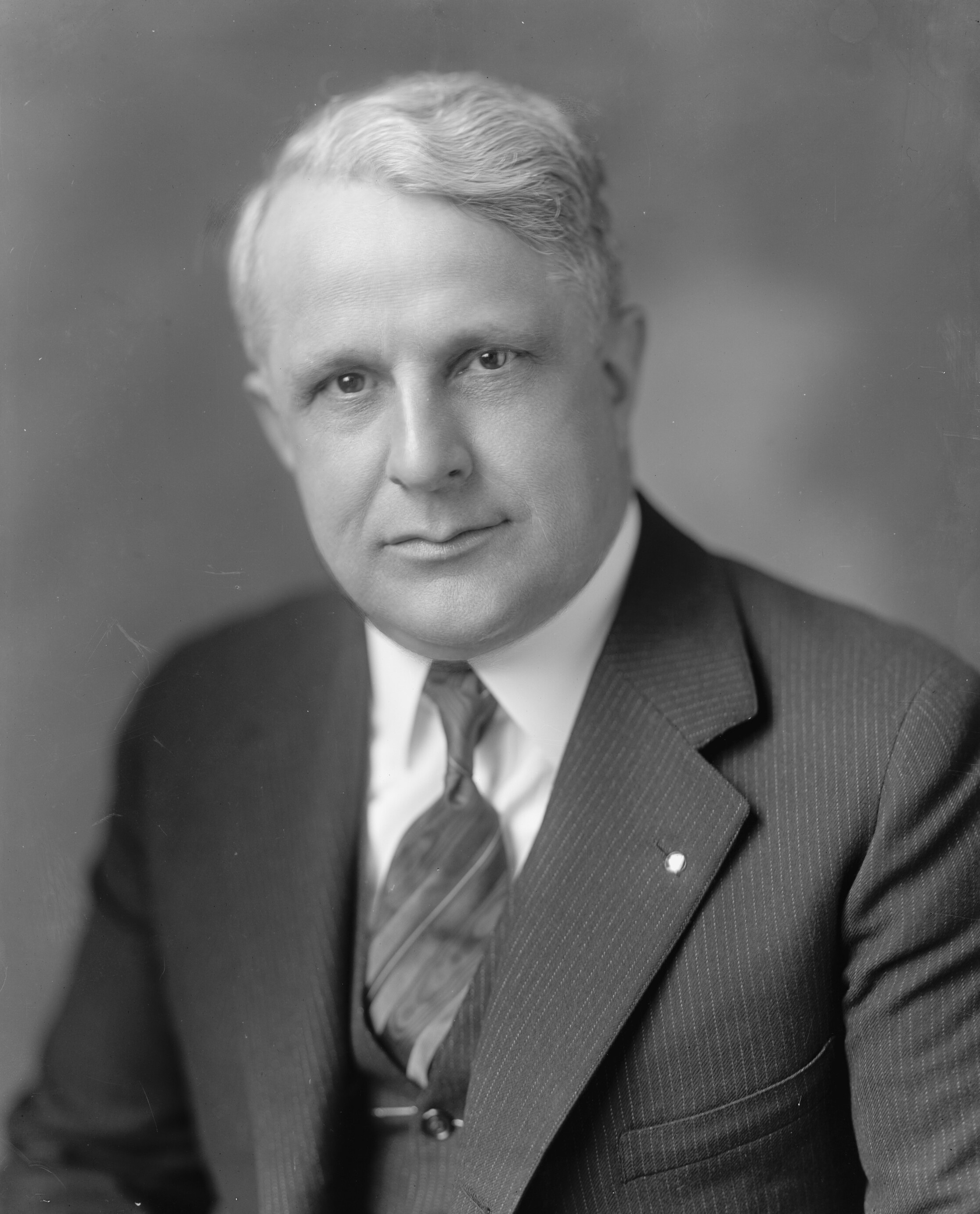

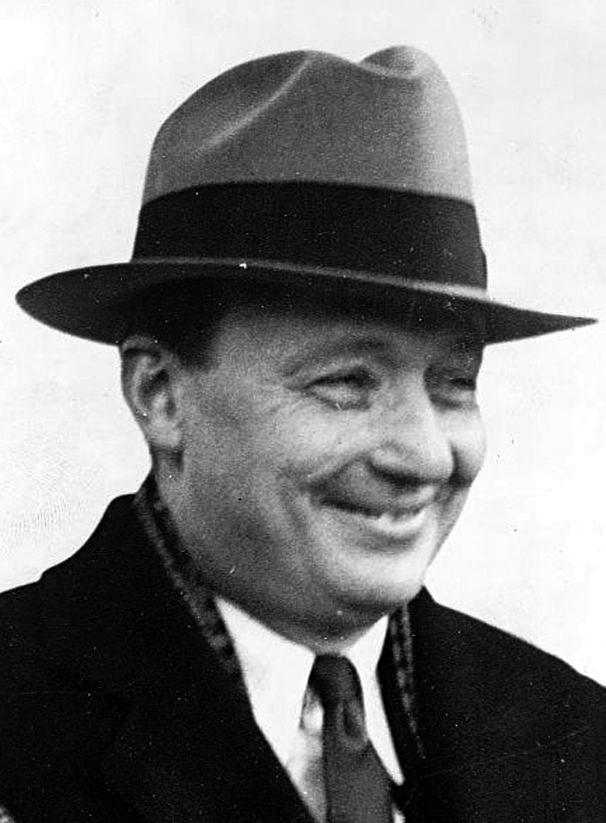
Nominee	James J. Davis	George Howard Earle III
Party	Republican	Democratic
Popular vote	2,086,931	1,694,367
Percentage	54.70%	44.41%
- County results Davis: 40–50% 50–60% 60–70% 70–80% Earle: 50–60%
U.S. senator before election
James J. Davis
Republican
Elected U.S. Senator
James J. Davis
Republican

The 1938 United States Senate election in Pennsylvania was held on November 8, 1938. Incumbent Republican U.S. Senator James J. Davis was re-elected to a second term in office over Democratic Governor George Howard Earle III.

== General election ==
=== Candidates ===
- James J. Davis, incumbent U.S. Senator (Republican)
- George Howard Earle III, Governor of Pennsylvania (Democratic)
- David H.H. Felix (Socialist)
- Reginald B. Naugle (Pathfinders)
- Pat Toohey (Communist)
- Furest S. Van Valin (Prohibition)

=== Results ===
1938 U.S. Senate election in Pennsylvania
Party	Candidate	Votes	%	±%
Republican	James J. Davis (incumbent)	2,086,931	54.70%	
Democratic	George Howard Earle III	1,694,367	44.41%	
Socialist	David H.H. Felix	20,155	0.53%	
Prohibition	Furest S. Van Valin	9,327	0.24%	
Pathfinders	Reginald B. Naugle	2,508	0.07%	
Communist	Pat Toohey	1,530	0.04%	
Write-in		104	0.00%	
Total votes		3,814,922	100.00%	
