= James J. Davis =

American politician (1873–1947)

James Davis
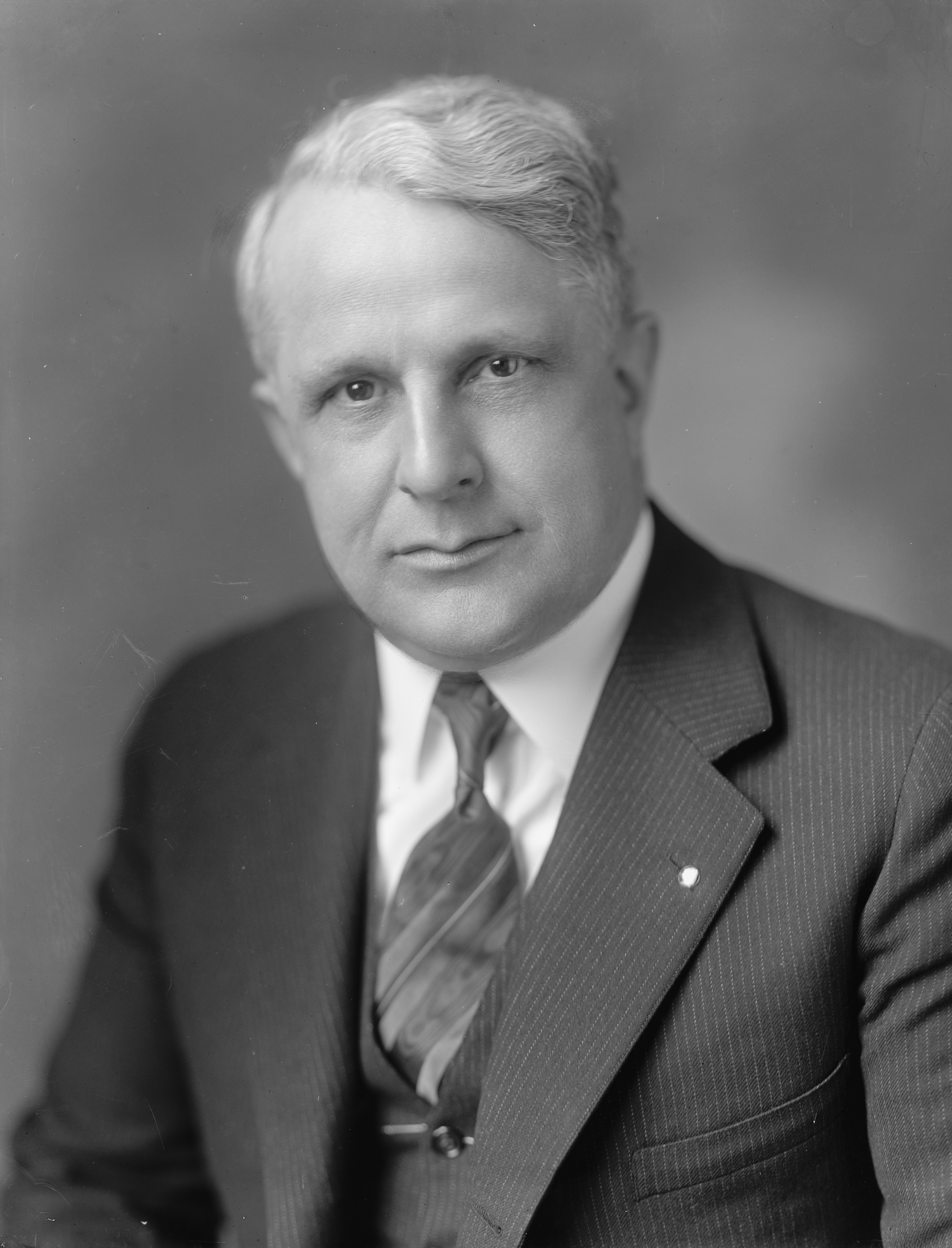
- Davis, 1905–1945

United States Senator from Pennsylvania
- In office December 2, 1930 – January 3, 1945
- Preceded by: Joe Grundy
- Succeeded by: Francis Myers

2nd United States Secretary of Labor
- In office March 5, 1921 – November 30, 1930
- President: Warren G. Harding; Calvin Coolidge; Herbert Hoover
- Preceded by: William Wilson
- Succeeded by: William Doak

Personal details
- Born: James John Davies; October 27, 1873 Tredegar, Wales
- Died: November 22, 1947 (aged 74) Takoma Park, Maryland, U.S.
- Party: Republican
- Spouse: Jean Rodenbaugh
- Children: 5
- Education: Sharon Business School

James John Davis (October 27, 1873 – November 22, 1947) was a Welsh-born American businessman, author and Republican Party politician in Pittsburgh, Pennsylvania. He served as U.S. Secretary of Labor and represented Pennsylvania in the United States Senate. He was also known by the nicknames of the "Iron Puddler" and "Puddler Jim."

== Early life and career ==
Born as James John Davies on October 27, 1873, at 47 Fifth Row, Georgetown, Tredegar, Monmouthshire, Wales. He emigrated with his parents, David James Davies and Esther Ford Davies (née Nichols), to the United States in 1881 at the age of eight.

They settled in Pittsburgh, Pennsylvania, and later in Sharon, Pennsylvania. He was apprenticed as a puddler's assistant in a steel mill, and as a result, acquired his nickname. In 1893, he moved to Elwood, Indiana, and served as city clerk from 1898 to 1902. From 1903 to 1907, he served as Recorder of Madison County, Indiana, before returning to Pittsburgh. He personally signed his name as James J. Davies even though his surname had been changed on immigration to Davis and he became well known with the surname Davis. He married Jean Rodenbaugh and had five children.

Davis joined the Loyal Order of Moose in 1906 as its 247th member and staged a successful reorganization. He rose to become the Director-General and took the Order internationally to Bermuda, Britain and Canada. He was instrumental as a leader in building Mooseheart, the fraternity's "Child City". In 1926, he founded the Grand Lodge of Britain at his birthplace in Tredegar, South Wales.

== Political views ==
Davis advocated for immigration policy that was explicitly racist, hoping "that America may not be a conglomeration of racial groups, each advocating a different set of ideas and ideals according to their bringing up, but a homogeneous race."

Davis supported the eugenics movement. Historian Hans P. Vought argues that Davis lamented the influx of cheap labor from Southern and Eastern Europe. Vought writes that Davis believed that Americans had, thanks to the eugenics movement, learned to discern between "bad stock and good stock, weak blood and strong blood, sound heredity and sickly human stuff."

Davis supported the rights of workers to strike, but only to a certain extent; he asked unions to "be slow to use the strike weapon." He was against the 12-hour workday that predominated in the American steel industry during the early 1920s.

== Later career ==
In 1922, Davis published his autobiography, The Iron Puddler, which was ghostwritten by C. L. Edson, who had previously worked for Davis as an editor of a Loyal Order of Moose publication. He served as United States Secretary of Labor from 1921 to 1930 under Presidents Warren G. Harding, Calvin Coolidge, and Herbert Hoover. He is one of only three Cabinet officers in U.S. history to hold the same post under three consecutive Presidents. The other two Cabinet officers to accomplish this were Secretary of Agriculture James Wilson and Secretary of the Treasury Andrew Mellon. During his tenure, he focused on immigration, then a Labor Department responsibility, and established the United States Border Patrol and proposed restrictions in immigration quotas. At the urging of the iron and steel workers union, he successfully urged U.S. Steel to abandon the 12-hour workday.

He resigned as Secretary of Labor upon his election to the United States Senate from Pennsylvania, accepting the seat denied to William Vare. During his tenure in the Senate, he co-sponsored the Davis–Bacon Act with New York Congressman Robert Bacon.

In April 1943, in the middle of the Second World War, a secret analysis of the members of the U.S. Senate Foreign Relations Committee was prepared for the British Foreign Office by English intellectual Isaiah Berlin. Berlin's judgments of the Senators on the committee were literate, highly critical, and sometimes contemptuous. He described the Welsh-born Davis as:

Commonly known as "puddler Jim" since he started his career as a steel worker. He was born in South Wales, became a Labour politician during the last war and Secretary of Labour shortly afterward. He is violently hated by organised labour, since he is regarded as having prostituted his labour connexion only in order to betray his fellow-workers over and over again. He is a pure opportunist, put into the Senate by the powerful Sun Oil interest in Pennsylvania, declares that he is not an Isolationist. This is true only in so far as he appears to have no convictions of any kind, and will vote in whatever direction is required by the interest which is running him at any given moment. His bête noire is his fellow Pennsylvanian in the Senate, Joseph F. Guffey.

Davis was narrowly defeated for re-election in 1944, and subsequently resumed his work with the Loyal Order of Moose until his death.

== Death ==
Davis died in Takoma Park, Maryland in 1947, following a heart attack at the age of 74. He is buried at Union Dale Cemetery in Pittsburgh.

== See also ==
- List of foreign-born United States Cabinet members
- List of United States senators born outside the United States

== Bibliography ==
- The Iron Puddler: My Life in the Rolling Mills and What Came of It. New York: Grosset and Dunlap, 1922 (ghostwritten by C. L. Edson).

== Sources ==
- John Bruce Dudley, James J. Davis: Secretary of Labor Under Three Presidents. PhD dissertation. Ball State University, 1972.

Political offices
| Preceded by William Wilson | United States Secretary of Labor; 1921–1930 | Succeeded by William Doak |
Party political offices
| Preceded by William Vare | Republican nominee for U.S. Senator from Pennsylvania (Class 3); 1930, 1932, 1938, 1944 | Succeeded by Jim Duff |
U.S. Senate
| Preceded by Joe Grundy | U.S. Senator (Class 3) from Pennsylvania; 1930–1945; Served alongside: David Reed, Joe Guffey | Succeeded by Francis Myers |
