= William Scott Vare =

American politician (1867-1934)

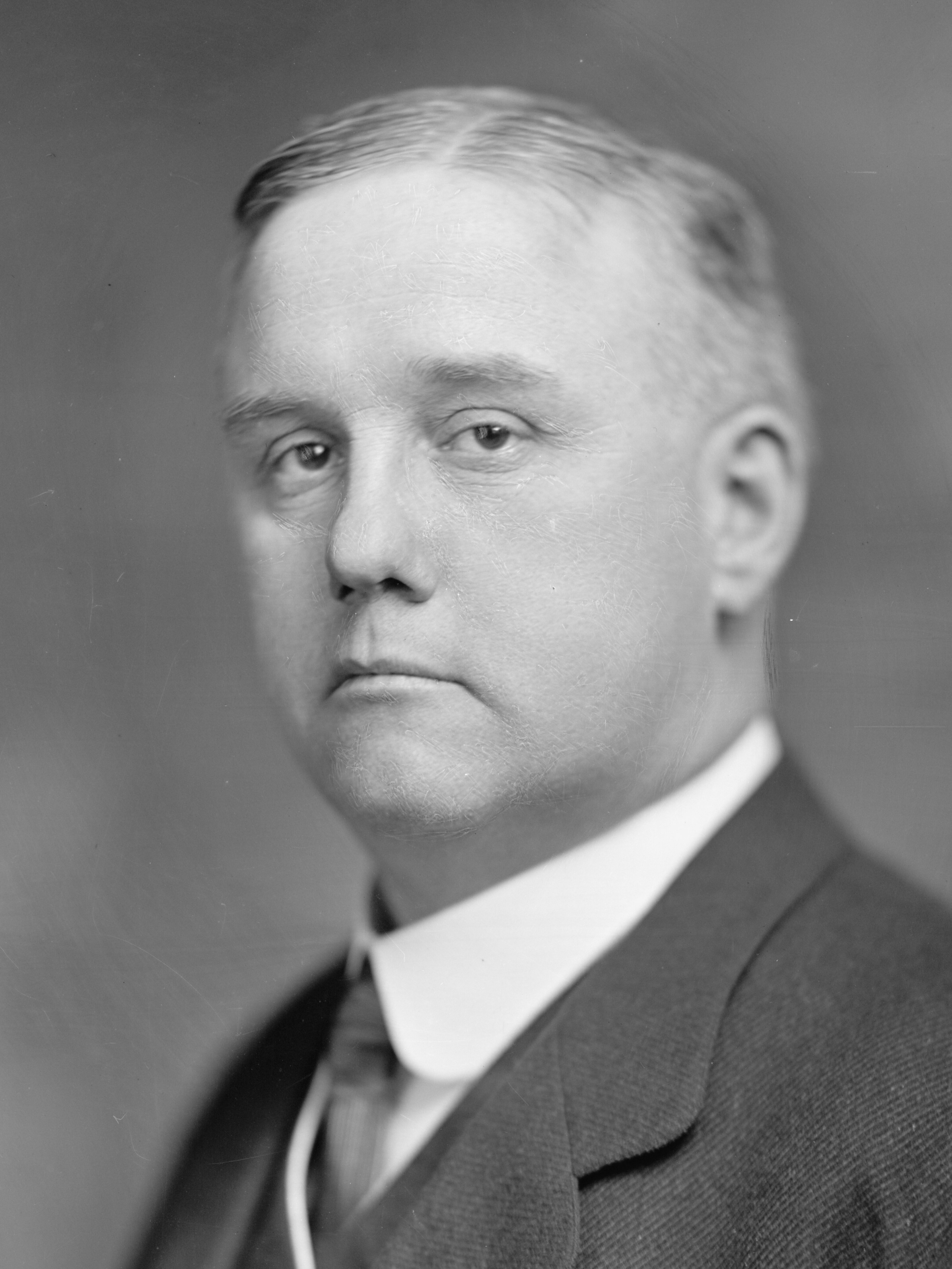
- Vare, 1905–1934

United States Senator-elect from Pennsylvania
- In office March 4, 1927 – December 6, 1929; Not seated
- Preceded by: George Pepper
- Succeeded by: Joe Grundy

Member of the U.S. House of Representatives from Pennsylvania's 1st district
- In office March 4, 1923 – March 3, 1927
- Preceded by: Himself
- Succeeded by: James Hazlett
- In office May 24, 1912 – January 2, 1923
- Preceded by: Henry Bingham
- Succeeded by: Himself

Member of the Pennsylvania Senate from the 1st district
- In office November 7, 1922 – November 30, 1923
- Preceded by: Edwin Vare
- Succeeded by: Flora M. Vare

Personal details
- Born: William Scott Vare; December 24, 1867 Philadelphia, Pennsylvania, U.S.
- Died: August 7, 1934 (aged 66) Atlantic City, New Jersey, U.S.
- Party: Republican (Before 1934); Democratic (1934)

William Scott Vare (December 24, 1867 – August 7, 1934) was an American politician from Pennsylvania who served as a Republican member of the United States House of Representatives for Pennsylvania's 1st congressional district from 1912 to 1927. He also served as a member of the Pennsylvania State Senate from the 1st senatorial district from 1922 to 1923. He won election to the United States Senate for Pennsylvania in 1926 but was never seated and was eventually removed in 1929 due to allegations of corruption and voter fraud.

He was a notorious political boss in the Philadelphia Republican machine of the early 20th century. Vare and his two brothers, Edwin and George, were known as the "Dukes of South Philadelphia" and held political control over South Philadelphia ward leadership and patronage jobs for decades. The contracting business he owned along with his brothers was involved in the construction of well-known sites in Philadelphia such as Municipal Stadium, the Broad Street subway and the Philadelphia Museum of Art.

== Early life ==
Vare was born in Philadelphia, Pennsylvania to Augustus and Abigail Vare. He was the youngest of three brothers, all of whom were contractors and politicians. George (1859–1908), Edwin (1862–1922) and William were known as the "Dukes of South Philadelphia" and controlled ward leadership and patronage jobs for decades.

He grew up on a pig and produce farm in Philadelphia at the current location of Fourth Street and Snyder Avenue.

John Wanamaker, the department store magnate, took young Bill under his wing and paid for his tuition at Central High School in Philadelphia. Later, he worked as a storeboy at Wanamaker's.

At age 15, Vare entered the mercantile business and became a general contractor in 1893.

== Career ==
His political career began in 1884 when he observed the Mummers parade on New Year's Day and realized that such marches could be employed in political campaigns. The Vare brothers started a family business hauling ash and garbage in South Philadelphia. In 1890 he started construction contracting with his two older brothers. Vare Brothers contracting worked on excavating, paving and municipal contracts for the city of Philadelphia that totaled $7 million between 1909 and 1912. Their projects included building trolley tracks, sewers, the Municipal Stadium, the Broad Street subway and excavating the site of the Philadelphia Museum of Art.

Vare was elected to Philadelphia City Council in 1898 and served until 1901. He served as Recorder of Deeds for Philadelphia from 1902 to 1912. In 1911, he ran for mayor as a moderate Republican. The primary was won by George Earle, Jr., but it split the Republican organization in Philadelphia three different ways, and it was these splits that accounted for Independent Rudolph Blankenburg's election in 1911.

In 1912, Vare was elected to the Pennsylvania State Senate and at the same time was elected to the U.S. Congress for the Pennsylvania 1st congressional district seat left vacant by the death of Henry H. Bingham.

In November 1922, he was elected to the Pennsylvania Senate in a special election to fill the first district seat left vacant by his brother Edwin's death. Vare resigned the seat a year later. His sister-in-law Flora, won the ensuing special election, becoming the first woman to serve in the chamber.

=== United States House of Representatives ===
In 1912, Vare was elected to the first of seven terms in the House of Representatives. While in the House, his voting record took a much more pronounced turn to the left. He supported the abolition of child labor, the federal income tax, the rights of unions to bargain collectively, and voting rights for women and the ending of segregation on passenger rail cars. In 1921 Vare's rival, Senator Boies Penrose, died. The following year his older brother Ed also died. This left Bill Vare as the undisputed political leader of Philadelphia, with broad influence over the burgeoning industrial and economic region of the middle Atlantic seaboard.

Vare's voting record in the United States House of Representatives was classically Pennsylvania Republican, or more liberal on social issues and then more conservative on issues of pure business. Vare repeatedly pursued the repeal of Prohibition because of the cruel police state it imposed, and was actually able to show, statistically, that alcohol-related crimes increased threefold in Philadelphia during the first years of Prohibition.

Vare's enemies called him "Boss Vare". The Republican organization in Philadelphia received many offers to do business from the likes of Waxey Gordon and "Lucky" Luciano. But this was no ordinary arrangement, as Vare forced both Gordon and Luciano to agree that Vare would hold a veto power over any racket operating in Philadelphia. In a further bid to gird the fiscal foundation of the Party, Vare decided to extract "loyalty oaths" from the entire Philadelphia Republican organization. Vare was also able to exert tremendous influence over Philadelphia's legal business. This was a strong form of politics, because Vare had much influence with the unions.

Vare used his political power to relocate the Sesquicentennial Exposition from Center City, Philadelphia to South Philadelphia and provide his constituents with millions of dollars' worth of jobs and infrastructure investment.

=== Senate scandal and end of career ===
in 1926, Vare ran for the United States Senate. He defeated Governor Gifford Pinchot in the primary and Democrat William B. Wilson in the general election. Both the primaries and general election were mired in scandal. After Vare apparently won the election, Governor Pinchot refused to certify the election. In January 1927, Pinchot testified before the Senate, producing several thousand illegal paper ballots. Wilson alleged that voter fraud in the election included padded registration lists, phantom voters, and voter intimidation. Vare remained powerful; his unexpectedly supporting Herbert Hoover as the nominee at the 1928 Republican National Convention forced other party leaders to also do so, helping end hopes to draft President Calvin Coolidge to run again. The Pennsylvania delegation at the convention unanimously supported a resolution demanding that Vare be allowed to enter the Senate. In August 1928, Vare was partially paralyzed by a stroke brought on by the stress of the Senate investigation.

In December 1929, the Senate voted 58–22 to deny the Senate seat to Vare. While the Senate agreed that he had won the seat, the reason given for denying him the seat was that he had spent excessively to win the nomination. Governor John S. Fisher (successor to Pinchot) appointed Joseph R. Grundy to the vacant Senate seat. However, Vare regarded the Senate's action as endorsement of Pinchot's charges. As a result, when Pinchot again ran for governor in 1930, Vare ran Francis Shunk Brown in the primary against him. Pinchot won, and Vare then supported Democratic nominee John Hemphill in the general election, which Pinchot also won. Vare also backed US Secretary of Labor James J. Davis, a Republican, in the special election for the remaining two years of Vare's Senate term, which Davis won. In spite of this, after the election there was a "palace coup" at the Republican City Committee: Vare was ousted and replaced by Davis.

Four years later, Vare attempted a comeback as a Democrat. However, the symptoms of the 1928 stroke had become worse in the ensuing six years, and he died on the sixth anniversary of the stroke. He is interred in West Laurel Hill Cemetery in Bala Cynwyd, Pennsylvania.

== Personal life ==
Vare was married to Ida Morris.

== Bibliography ==
- William S. Vare, My Forty Years in Politics, Philadelphia, Roland Swain Co, 1933

== See also ==
- List of federal political scandals in the United States

U.S. House of Representatives
Preceded by Henry Bingham	Member of the U.S. House of Representatives from Pennsylvania's 1st congressional district 1912–1923	Succeeded by Himself
Preceded by Himself	Member of the U.S. House of Representatives from Pennsylvania's 1st congressional district 1923–1927	Succeeded by James Hazlett
Party political offices
Preceded by George Pepper	Republican nominee for U.S. Senator from Pennsylvania (Class 3); 1926	Succeeded by James Davis
U.S. Senate
Preceded by George Pepper	U.S. Senator-elect (Class 3) from Pennsylvania; Not seated 1927–1929; Served alongside: David A. Reed	Succeeded by Joe Grundy
