= Joseph R. Grundy =

American politician (1863–1961)

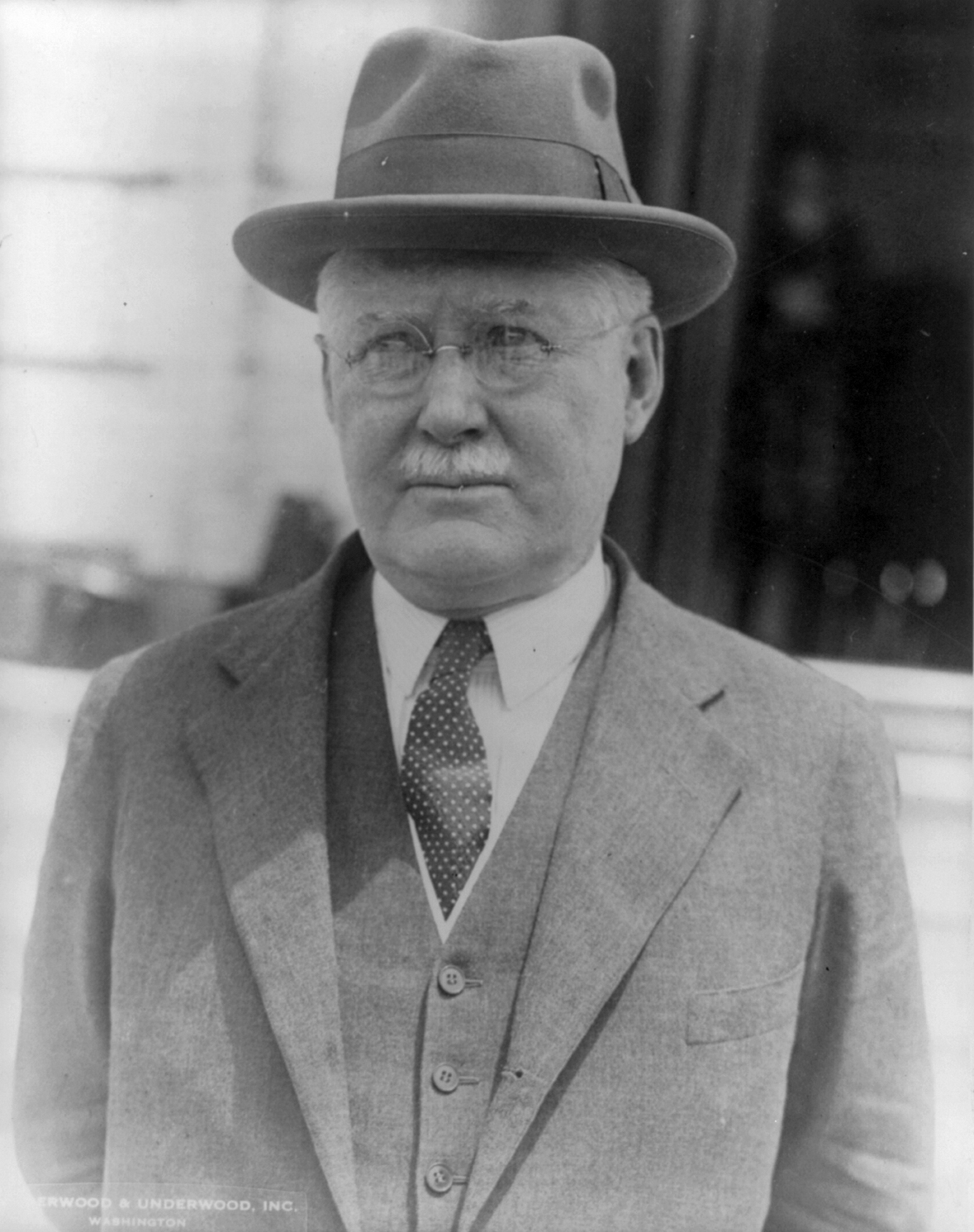
- Grundy in 1926

United States Senator from Pennsylvania
- In office December 11, 1929 – December 1, 1930
- Appointed by: John Stuchell Fisher
- Preceded by: William Vare^{[a]}
- Succeeded by: James Davis

Personal details
- Born: January 13, 1863 Camden, New Jersey
- Died: March 3, 1961 (aged 98) Nassau, Bahamas
- Party: Republican
- a.Vare was not permitted to qualify for the seat, though his defeat of Pepper in the primary election was recognized by the Senate. However, due to alleged election fraud, Vare was never seated.

Joseph Ridgway Grundy (January 13, 1863 – March 3, 1961) was an American textile manufacturer and Republican Party politician from Bristol, Pennsylvania. He represented Pennsylvania in the United States Senate.

== Biography ==
He was educated at Swarthmore College. Grundy had a summer home on the Neshaminy Creek called Walnut Grove and one in the city of Bristol Borough. Grundy was a member of the Five O'Clock Club of Philadelphia.

Grundy was the founder and President of the Pennsylvania Manufacturers Association and a strong advocate of protectionism. He was a longtime Republican activist and an ally of Pennsylvania Republican leaders including Boies Penrose and Andrew Mellon.

In his memoir, the economist and social activist Scott Nearing claimed that Grundy, whose textile mills employed workers as young as thirteen, objected to the efforts of activists to restrict child labor by raising the age of full-time legal employment. Nearing also described Grundy as one of the conservatives whose influence over the Pennsylvania legislature (which was giving subventions to universities in the state) prompted trustees at the University of Pennsylvania to fire Nearing – a professor at the Wharton School of Business – in 1915, leading to what historians have described as one of the first major academic freedom debates in United States during the early twentieth century.

Grundy was appointed on December 11, 1929, by Governor John Stuchell Fisher to the United States Senate to fill the vacancy caused by the refusal of the Senate to seat William S. Vare. He served from December 11, 1929, to December 1, 1930, when a duly elected successor, James J. Davis, qualified. On March 1, 1958, he became the oldest living former senator; he was the last living senator who was alive during the Civil War. Grundy returned to the textile industry and banking (President of Farmer's Bank) in Bristol until 1947. Grundy split his time between Bristol and his vacation home in the Bahamas.

When he died in the Bahamas in 1961, he left no heirs. The Bristol Borough home of Senator Grundy, as stated in his will, was left to be preserved as a museum and memorial library named after his only sister, Margaret Ridgway Grundy, in her and their family's honor and is open to the public for touring free of charge. The Victorian home includes a collection of the Grundy family's original possessions from both their Walnut Grove home and Bristol Borough home as well as exquisite wood detailing throughout.

U.S. Senate
Preceded by William Vare^{1}	U.S. senator (Class 3) from Pennsylvania; December 11, 1929 – December 1, 1930; Served alongside: David Reed	Succeeded by James Davis
Honorary titles
Preceded by Lawrence Phipps	Oldest living U.S. senator March 1, 1958 – March 4, 1961	Succeeded by George Pepper
Notes and references
1. As Senator-elect. George Pepper was the last person elected and sworn-into seat.
