= 1910–11 United States Senate elections =

- January 18, 1910 – July 12, 1911
- Class 1

36 of the 92 seats in the United States Senate 47 seats needed for a majority
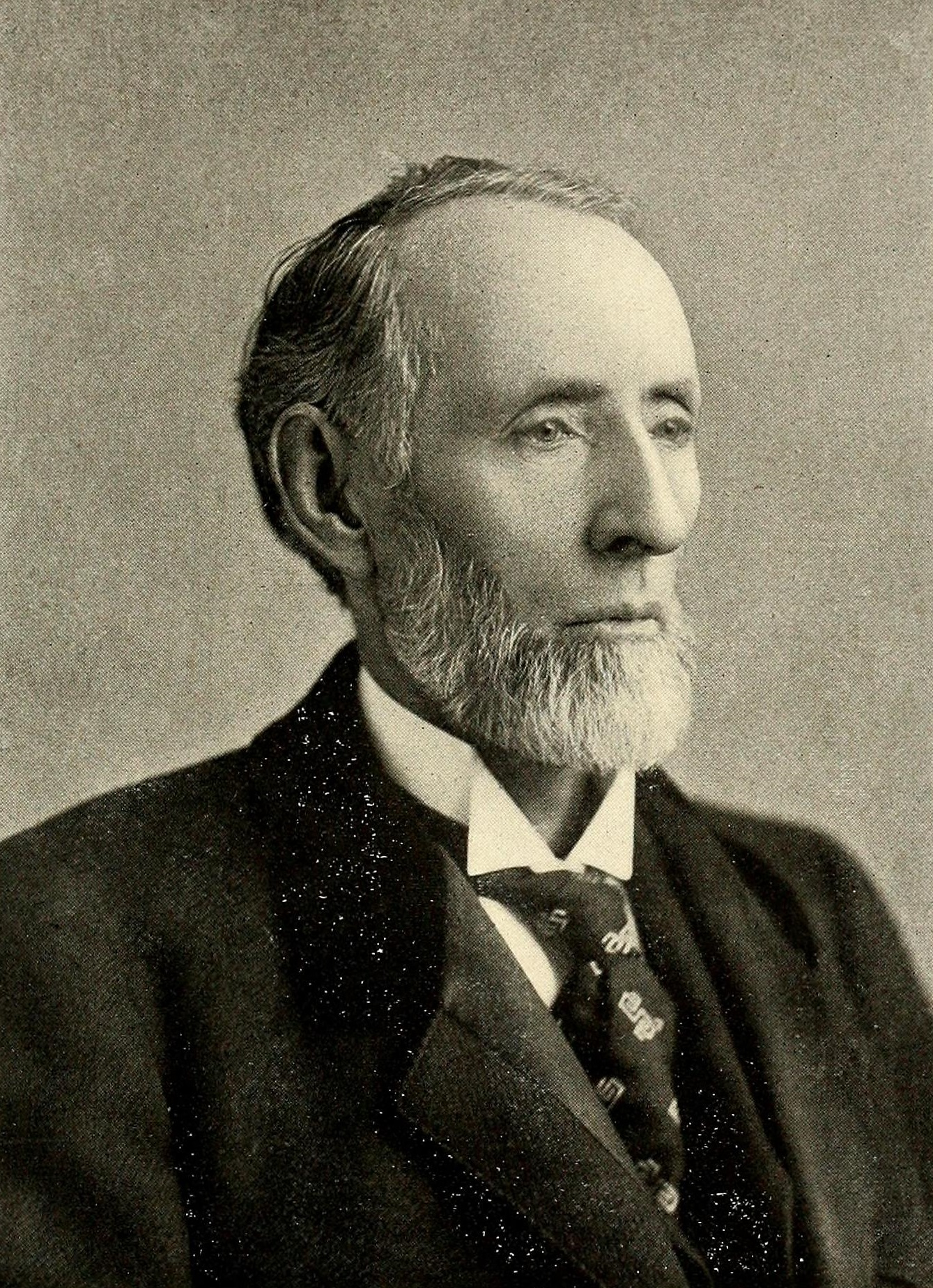

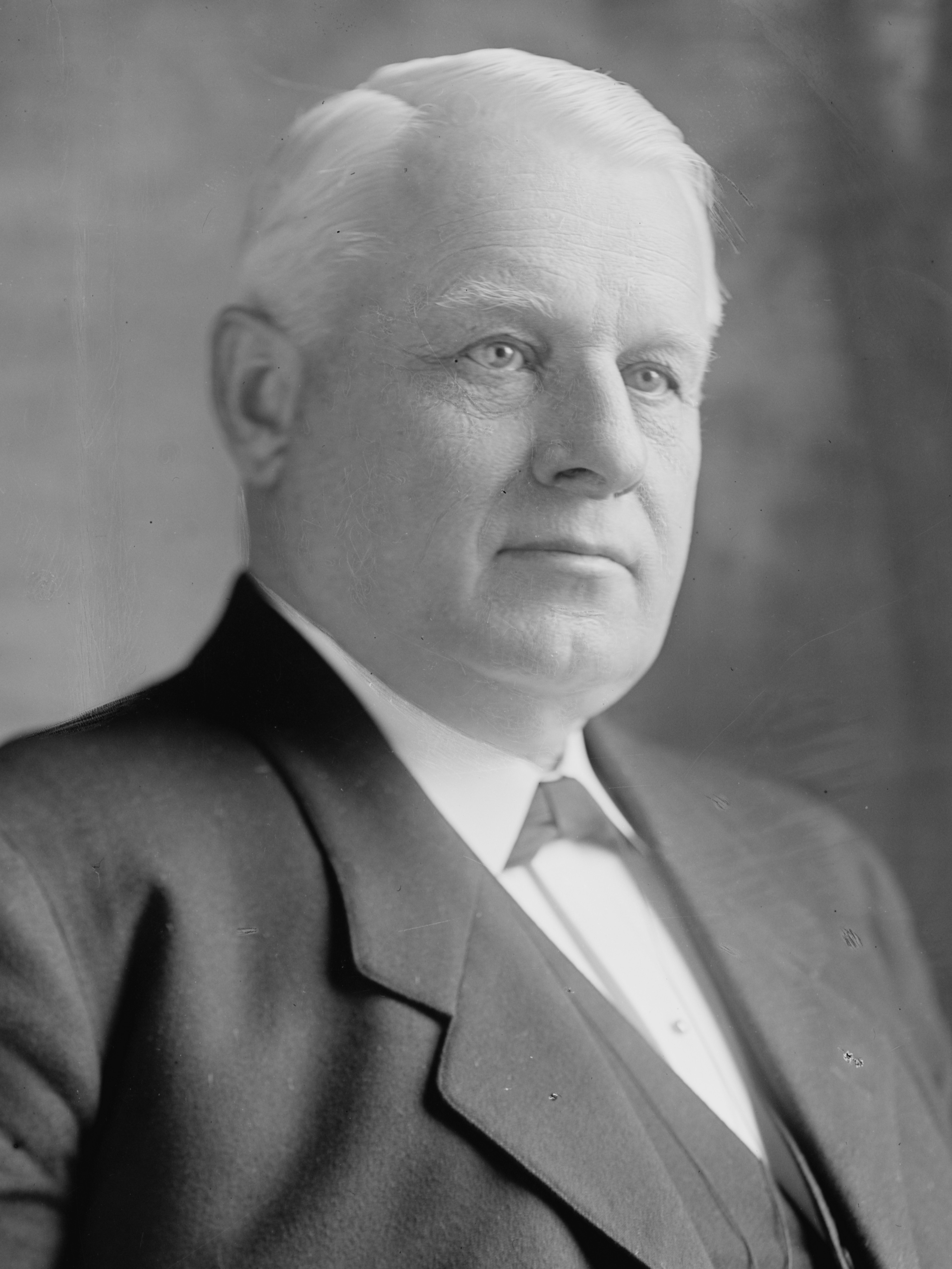
	Majority party	Minority party
Leader	Shelby Moore Cullom (Note: as Republican Conference chairman) (retired)	Thomas S. Martin (Note: as Democratic Conference chairman)
Party	Republican	Democratic
Leader since	March 4, 1909	March 4, 1909
Leader's seat	Illinois	Virginia
Seats before	59	33
Seats won	15	13
Seats after	50	42
Seat change	▼9	▲9
Seats up	25	11
- Results of the elections: Democratic gain Democratic hold Republican gain Republican hold
Majority conference chairman before election
Eugene Hale
Republican
Elected Majority conference chairman
Shelby Moore Cullom
Republican

The 1910–11 United States Senate elections were held on various dates in various states. As these U.S. Senate elections were prior to the ratification of the Seventeenth Amendment in 1913, senators were primarily chosen by state legislatures. Senators were elected over a wide range of time throughout 1910 and 1911, and a seat may have been filled months late or remained vacant due to legislative deadlock. However, some states had already begun direct elections during this time. Oregon pioneered direct election and experimented with different measures over several years until it succeeded in 1907. Soon after, Nebraska followed suit and laid the foundation for other states to adopt measures reflecting the people's will. By 1912, as many as 29 states elected senators either as nominees of their party's primary or in conjunction with a general election.

In these elections, terms were up for the senators in Class 1. In conjunction with winning control of the House of Representatives for the first time since the 1892 elections, Democrats flipped nine Senate seats. This was not enough to flip the Senate, but significantly narrowed the margin of Republican control.

In New York and Florida, the legislature failed to elect until after the beginning of the 62nd Congress on March 4. Special elections were held in six states: Alabama, Georgia, Louisiana, Mississippi, North Dakota, and West Virginia.

== Result Summary ==
Senate party division, 62nd Congress (1911–1913):

- Majority party: Republican (50 seats)
- Minority party: Democratic (40 seats)
- Other parties: 0
- Vacant: 2
- Total seats: 92

Four seats were added in early 1912 for new states: Arizona (which elected two Democrats) and New Mexico (which elected two Republicans).

== Change in composition ==
=== Before the elections ===
At the beginning of 1910.

				D_{1}	D_{2}	D_{3}	D_{4}	D_{5}	D_{6}
D_{16}	D_{15}	D_{14}	D_{13}	D_{12}	D_{11}	D_{10}	D_{9}	D_{8}	D_{7}
D_{17}	D_{18}	D_{19}	D_{20}	D_{21}	D_{22}	D_{23}	D_{24} Ala. Ran	D_{25} Fla. Ran	D_{26} La. (sp); Ran
R_{57} W.Va. (reg); Ran	R_{58} Wis. Ran	R_{59} Wyo. Ran	D_{33} Va. Ran	D_{32} Texas; Ran	D_{31} Tenn. Ran	D_{30} N.D. (sp); Ran	D_{29} Miss. (sp); Retired	D_{28} Miss. (reg); Ran	D_{27} Md. Ran
R_{56} W.Va. (sp); Retired	R_{55} Wash. Retired	R_{54} Vt. Ran	R_{53} Utah; Ran	R_{52} R.I. Retired	R_{51} Pa. Ran	R_{50} Ohio; Ran	R_{49} N.D. (reg); Ran	R_{48} N.Y. Ran	R_{47} N.J. Ran
Majority →									R_{47} N.J. Ran
R_{37} Del. Ran	R_{38} Ind. Ran	R_{39} Maine; Ran	R_{40} Mass. Ran	R_{41} Mich. Ran	R_{42} Minn. Ran	R_{43} Mo. Retired	R_{44} Mont. Retired	R_{45} Neb. Ran	R_{46} Nev. Ran
R_{36} Conn. Ran	R_{35} Calif. Retired	R_{34}	R_{33}	R_{32}	R_{31}	R_{30}	R_{29}	R_{28}	R_{27}
R_{17}	R_{18}	R_{19}	R_{20}	R_{21}	R_{22}	R_{23}	R_{24}	R_{25}	R_{26}
R_{16}	R_{15}	R_{14}	R_{13}	R_{12}	R_{11}	R_{10}	R_{9}	R_{8}	R_{7}
				R_{1}	R_{2}	R_{3}	R_{4}	R_{5}	R_{6}

=== Elections results ===
				D_{1}	D_{2}	D_{3}	D_{4}	D_{5}	D_{6}
D_{16}	D_{15}	D_{14}	D_{13}	D_{12}	D_{11}	D_{10}	D_{9}	D_{8}	D_{7}
D_{17}	D_{18}	D_{19}	D_{20}	D_{21}	D_{22}	D_{23}	D_{24} Ala. Re-elected	D_{25} Ind. Gain	D_{26} La. (sp); Elected (Note: Appointee elected)
D_{36} Tenn. Hold	D_{35} Ohio; Gain	D_{34} N.J. Gain	D_{33} Neb. Gain	D_{32} Mont. Gain	D_{31} Mo. Gain	D_{30} Miss. (sp); Hold	D_{29} Miss. (reg); Hold	D_{28} Md. Re-elected	D_{27} Maine; Gain
D_{37} Texas; Re-elected	D_{38} Va. Re-elected	D_{39} W.Va. (reg); Gain	D_{40} W.Va. (sp); Gain	V_{1} Fla. D loss	V_{2} N.Y. R loss	R_{51} Wyo. Re-elected	R_{50} Wis. Re-elected	R_{49} Wash. Hold	R_{48} Vt. Re-elected
Majority →									R_{48} Vt. Re-elected
R_{37} Del. Re-elected	R_{38} Mass. Re-elected	R_{39} Mich. Hold	R_{40} Minn. Re-elected	R_{41} Nev. Re-elected	R_{42} N.D. (reg); Re-elected	R_{43} N.D. (sp); Gain	R_{44} Pa. Re-elected	R_{45} R.I. Hold	R_{46} Utah; Re-elected
R_{36} Conn. Hold	R_{35} Calif. Hold	R_{34}	R_{33}	R_{32}	R_{31}	R_{30}	R_{29}	R_{28}	R_{27}
R_{17}	R_{18}	R_{19}	R_{20}	R_{21}	R_{22}	R_{23}	R_{24}	R_{25}	R_{26}
R_{16}	R_{15}	R_{14}	R_{13}	R_{12}	R_{11}	R_{10}	R_{9}	R_{8}	R_{7}
				R_{1}	R_{2}	R_{3}	R_{4}	R_{5}	R_{6}

=== Beginning of the next Congress ===
				D_{1}	D_{2}	D_{3}	D_{4}	D_{5}	D_{6}
D_{16}	D_{15}	D_{14}	D_{13}	D_{12}	D_{11}	D_{10}	D_{9}	D_{8}	D_{7}
D_{17}	D_{18}	D_{19}	D_{20}	D_{21}	D_{22}	D_{23}	D_{24}	D_{25}	D_{26}
D_{36}	D_{35}	D_{34}	D_{33}	D_{32}	D_{31}	D_{30}	D_{29}	D_{28}	D_{27}
D_{37}	D_{38}	D_{39}	D_{40} Fla. Appointed	V_{1} Colo. D loss (Note: Charles J. Hughes Jr. (D-Colorado) died on January 11, 1911, and the seat was vacant until the January 15, 1913 election of Democrat Charles S. Thomas.)	V_{2}	R_{50}	R_{49}	R_{48}	R_{47}
Majority →									R_{46}
R_{37}	R_{38}	R_{39}	R_{40}	R_{41}	R_{42}	R_{43}	R_{44}	R_{45}	R_{46}
R_{36}	R_{35}	R_{34}	R_{33}	R_{32}	R_{31}	R_{30}	R_{29}	R_{28}	R_{27}
R_{17}	R_{18}	R_{19}	R_{20}	R_{21}	R_{22}	R_{23}	R_{24}	R_{25}	R_{26}
R_{16}	R_{15}	R_{14}	R_{13}	R_{12}	R_{11}	R_{10}	R_{9}	R_{8}	R_{7}
				R_{1}	R_{2}	R_{3}	R_{4}	R_{5}	R_{6}

Key

D_{#}	Democratic
R_{#}	Republican
V_{#}	Vacant

== Race summaries ==
=== Special elections during the 61st Congress ===
In these elections, the winners were seated during 1910 or in 1911 before March 4; ordered by election date.

State	Incumbent			Results	Candidates
State	Senator	Party	Electoral history	Results	Candidates
Mississippi (Class 2)	James Gordon	Democratic	1909 (appointed)	Interim appointee retired. New senator elected February 23, 1910. Democratic hold.	▌ ✓ LeRoy Percy (Democratic); Unopposed
Louisiana (Class 3)	John Thornton	Democratic	1910 (appointed)	Interim appointee elected December 6, 1910.	▌ ✓ John Thornton (Democratic) 106; ▌Robert F. Broussard (Democratic) 28; ▌Lee E. Thomas (Democratic) 11; ▌John D. Wilkinson (Democratic) 6; ▌Jared Sanders (Democratic) 1
North Dakota (Class 3)	William E. Purcell	Democratic	1910 (appointed)	Interim appointee lost election. New senator elected January 17, 1911. Republican gain. Winner took office February 11, 1911, upon resigning from the U.S. House.	▌ ✓ Asle Gronna (Republican) 130; ▌William E. Purcell (Democratic) 19
West Virginia (Class 2)	Davis Elkins	Republican	1910 (appointed)	Interim appointee lost election. New senator elected February 1, 1911. Democratic gain.	▌ ✓ Clarence W. Watson (Democratic) 70; ▌W. P. Hubbard (Republican) 11; ▌John W. Davis (Democratic) 7; ▌Isaac T. Mann (Republican) 9; ▌Davis Elkins (Republican) 8; ▌W. M. O. Dawson (Republican) 2; ▌Howard Sutherland (Republican) 2; ▌Joseph H. Gaines (Republican) 1; ▌A. B. White (Republican) 1

In this election, the winners were seated in the 63rd Congress, starting March 4, 1913.

State	Incumbent			Results	Candidates
State	Senator	Party	Electoral history	Results	Candidates
Alabama	John H. Bankhead	Democratic	1907 (appointed); 1907 (special)	Incumbent re-elected early, on January 17, 1911, for the term beginning March 4, 1913.	▌ ✓ John H. Bankhead (Democratic); Unopposed

=== Races leading to the 62nd Congress ===
In these general elections, the winners were elected for the term beginning March 4, 1911; ordered by state.

All of the elections involved the Class 1 seats.

State	Incumbent			Results	Candidates
State	Senator	Party	Electoral history	Results	Candidates
California	Frank Flint	Republican	1905	Incumbent retired. New senator elected January 10, 1911. Republican hold.	▌ ✓ John D. Works (Republican) 92; ▌Albert Spalding (Republican) 21; ▌John E. Raker (Democratic) 3; ▌William Kent (Democratic) 1; ▌Edwin A. Meserve (Republican) 1
Connecticut	Morgan Bulkeley	Republican	1905	Incumbent lost renomination and re-election. New senator elected January 17, 1911. Republican hold.	▌ ✓ George P. McLean (Republican) 177; ▌Homer Stille Cummings (Democratic) 110; ▌Morgan Bulkeley (Republican) 1
Delaware	Henry A. du Pont	Republican	1906	Incumbent re-elected January 25, 1911.	▌ ✓ Henry A. du Pont (Republican) 31; ▌Willard Saulsbury Jr. (Democratic) 21
Florida	James Taliaferro	Democratic	1899 (special); 1905 (appointed); 1905 (special)	Incumbent lost re-election. Legislature failed to elect. Democratic loss. New senator was appointed to begin the term.	▌Nathan P. Bryan (Democratic)
Indiana	Albert J. Beveridge	Republican	1899; 1905	Incumbent lost re-election. New senator elected January 17, 1911. Democratic gain.	▌ ✓ John W. Kern (Democratic) 90; ▌Albert J. Beveridge (Republican) 60
Maine	Eugene Hale	Republican	1881; 1887; 1893; 1899; 1905	Incumbent retired. New senator elected January 17, 1911. Democratic gain.	▌ ✓ Charles F. Johnson (Democratic) 107; ▌Frederick A. Powers (Republican) 67
Maryland	Isidor Rayner	Democratic	1904	Incumbent re-elected January 18, 1910.	▌ ✓ Isidor Rayner (Democratic) 19; ▌William P. Jackson (Republican)
Massachusetts	Henry Cabot Lodge	Republican	1893; 1899; 1905	Incumbent re-elected January 18, 1911.	▌ ✓ Henry Cabot Lodge (Republican) 146; ▌Sherman L. Whipple (Democratic) 121; ▌Butler Ames (Republican) 7; ▌A. Lawrence Lowell (Republican) 2; Scattering 3
Michigan	Julius C. Burrows	Republican	1895 (special); 1899; 1905	Incumbent lost renomination. New senator elected January 17, 1911. Republican hold.	▌ ✓ Charles E. Townsend (Republican) 112; ▌John Winship (Democratic) 14
Minnesota	Moses E. Clapp	Republican	1901 (special); 1905	Incumbent re-elected January 17, 1911.	▌ ✓ Moses E. Clapp (Republican) 161; ▌R. T. O'Connor (Democratic) 13; ▌W. S. Hammond (Democratic) 3; ▌Thomas Van Lear (Socialist) 1
Mississippi	Hernando Money	Democratic	1897 (appointed); 1899; 1904	Incumbent retired. New senator elected early, on January 21, 1908. Democratic hold.	▌ ✓ John Sharp Williams (Democratic); Unopposed
Missouri	William Warner	Republican	1905	Incumbent retired. New senator elected January 17, 1911. Democratic gain.	▌ ✓ James A. Reed (Democratic) 104; ▌John C. McKinley (Republican) 70
Montana	Thomas H. Carter	Republican	1895; 1901 (lost); 1905	Incumbent retired. New senator elected March 2, 1911. Democratic gain.	▌ ✓ Henry L. Myers (Democratic) 53; ▌Thomas H. Carter (Republican) 45; Other 3
Nebraska	Elmer Burkett	Republican	1905	Incumbent lost re-election. New senator elected January 17, 1911, ratifying the popular selection made in 1910 state elections. Democratic gain.	▌ ✓ Gilbert Hitchcock (Democratic) 117; ▌Elmer Burkett (Republican) 10; ▌Daniel W. Cook (Republican) 1; Absent and not voting 5 In state election: ▌Gilbert Hitchcock (Democratic) 54.58%; ▌Elmer Burkett (Republican) 45.42%
Nevada	George S. Nixon	Republican	1905	Incumbent re-elected January 24, 1911, ratifying the popular selection made in 1910 state elections.	▌ ✓ George S. Nixon (Republican); Unopposed In state election: ▌George S. Nixon (Republican) 48.03%; ▌Key Pittman (Democratic) 42.35%; ▌Jud Harris (Socialist) 9.62%
New Jersey	John Kean	Republican	1899; 1905	Incumbent retired. New senator elected January 25, 1911. Democratic gain.	▌ ✓ James E. Martine (Democratic) 47; ▌Edward C. Stokes (Republican) 21; ▌John W. Griggs (Republican) 5; ▌James Smith Jr. (Democratic) 3; Others: ▌John Kean (Republican) 1; ▌J. Franklin Fort (Republican) 1; ▌Mahlon Pitney (Republican) 1
New York	Chauncey Depew	Republican	1899; 1905	Incumbent ran for re-election, but legislature failed to elect. Republican loss. A new senator was elected late; see below.	▌Chauncey Depew (Republican); ▌William F. Sheehan (Tammany Democrat); Others, see below
North Dakota	Porter J. McCumber	Republican	1899; 1905	Incumbent re-elected January 17, 1911.	▌ ✓ Porter J. McCumber (Republican) 129; ▌John Bruegger (Democratic) 20
Ohio	Charles W. F. Dick	Republican	1904 (special); 1904	Incumbent lost re-election. New senator elected January 10, 1911. Democratic gain.	▌ ✓ Atlee Pomerene (Democratic) 83; ▌Harry M. Daugherty (Republican) 17; ▌Charles W. F. Dick (Republican) 9; ▌Charles P. Taft (Republican) 7; ▌Frank Zumstein (Republican) 3; ▌Joseph G. Butler Jr. (Republican) 2; ▌Joseph B. Foraker (Republican) 2; ▌Warren G. Harding (Republican) 2; ▌James R. Garfield (Republican) 2; Others: ▌Renick W. Dunlap (Republican) 1; ▌Charles H. Grosvenor (Republican) 1; ▌R. R. Kinkade (Republican) 1; ▌Charles W. Stewart (Republican) 1; ▌Brand Whitlock (Independent) 1
Pennsylvania	George T. Oliver	Republican	1909 (special)	Incumbent re-elected January 11, 1911.	▌ ✓ George T. Oliver (Republican) 181; ▌J. Henry Cochran (Democratic) 35; ▌Julian Kennedy (Democratic) 25; ▌James B. Riley (Democratic) 3; ▌William Flinn (Republican) 2; Three others, 1 vote each; see below
Rhode Island	Nelson W. Aldrich	Republican	1881 (special); 1886; 1892; 1898; 1905	Incumbent retired. New senator elected January 18, 1911. Republican hold.	▌ ✓ Henry F. Lippitt (Republican) 72; ▌Arthur L. Brown (Democratic) 44; ▌LeBaron B. Colt (Republican) 23
Tennessee	James B. Frazier	Democratic	1905 (special)	Incumbent lost re-election. New senator elected January 23, 1911. Democratic hold.	▌ ✓ Luke Lea (Ind. Democratic) 68; ▌Benton McMillin (Democratic) 48; ▌L. D. Tyson (Democratic) 11; ▌Gilbert D. Raine (Democratic) 2; ▌J. R. Woolridge (Republican) 2
Texas	Charles A. Culberson	Democratic	1899; 1905	Incumbent re-elected January 24, 1911.	▌ ✓ Charles A. Culberson (Democratic); Unopposed
Utah	George Sutherland	Republican	1905	Incumbent re-elected January 17, 1911.	▌ ✓ George Sutherland (Republican) 54; ▌O. W. Powers (Democratic) 9
Vermont	Carroll S. Page	Republican	1908 (special)	Incumbent re-elected October 18, 1910.	▌ ✓ Carroll S. Page (Republican) 221; ▌Charles A. Prouty (Republican) 1; ▌David J. Foster (Republican) 1
Virginia	John W. Daniel	Democratic	1887; 1893; 1899; 1904	Incumbent re-elected on January 25, 1910, but died on June 29, 1910. A new senator was appointed to finish the term, and reappointed to begin the new term. The new senator was subsequently elected to finish the new term.	▌ ✓ John W. Daniel (Democratic) 99; ▌C. Bascom Slemp (Republican) 16
Washington	Samuel H. Piles	Republican	1905	Incumbent retired. New senator elected January 17, 1911. Republican hold.	▌ ✓ Miles Poindexter (Republican) 166; ▌George F. Cotterill (Democratic) 12
West Virginia	Nathan B. Scott	Republican	1899; 1905	Incumbent lost re-election. New senator elected February 1, 1911. Democratic gain.	▌ ✓ William E. Chilton (Democratic) 72; ▌Nathan B. Scott (Republican) 28; ▌C. C. Beury (Republican) 5; ▌John W. Davis (Democratic) 3; ▌Lewis Bennett (Democratic) 3; ▌Nathan Goff Jr. (Republican) 1; ▌Joseph H. Gaines (Republican) 1
Wisconsin	Robert M. La Follette	Republican	1905	Incumbent re-elected January 24, 1911.	▌ ✓ Robert M. La Follette (Republican) 83; ▌Charles H. Weisse (Democratic) 31; ▌Henry Kleist (Social Democratic) 14; ▌Frederick C. Winkler (Republican) 1
Wyoming	Clarence D. Clark	Republican	1905	Incumbent re-elected January 24, 1911.	▌ ✓ Clarence D. Clark (Republican) 46; ▌John B. Kendrick (Democratic) 34

=== Elections during the 62nd Congress ===
In these elections, the winners were elected in 1911 after March 4; ordered by date.

State	Incumbent			Results	Candidates
State	Senator	Party	Electoral history	Results	Candidates
New York (Class 1)	Vacant			Legislature had failed to elect, see above. New senator elected late March 31, 1911 on the sixty-fourth ballot. Democratic gain.	▌ ✓ James A. O'Gorman (Democratic) 112; ▌Chauncey Depew (Republican) 80
Iowa (Class 2)	Lafayette Young	Republican	1911 (appointed)	Interim appointee lost election to finish the term. New senator elected April 12, 1911. Republican hold.	▌ ✓ William S. Kenyon (Republican) 85; ▌Claude R. Porter (Democratic) 51; ▌Horace E. Deemer (Republican) 19
Florida (Class 1)	Nathan P. Bryan	Democratic	1911 (appointed)	Interim appointee elected late April 18, 1911.	▌ ✓ Nathan P. Bryan (Democratic); Unopposed
Georgia (Class 3)	Joseph M. Terrell	Democratic	1910 (appointed)	Interim appointee lost election. New senator elected July 12, 1911. Democratic hold.	▌ ✓ Hoke Smith (Democratic) 155; ▌Joseph M. Terrell (Democratic) 51; ▌W. A. Covington (Democratic) 6; ▌Thomas E. Watson (Populist) 7; ▌John M. Holder (Democratic) 1

== Alabama ==
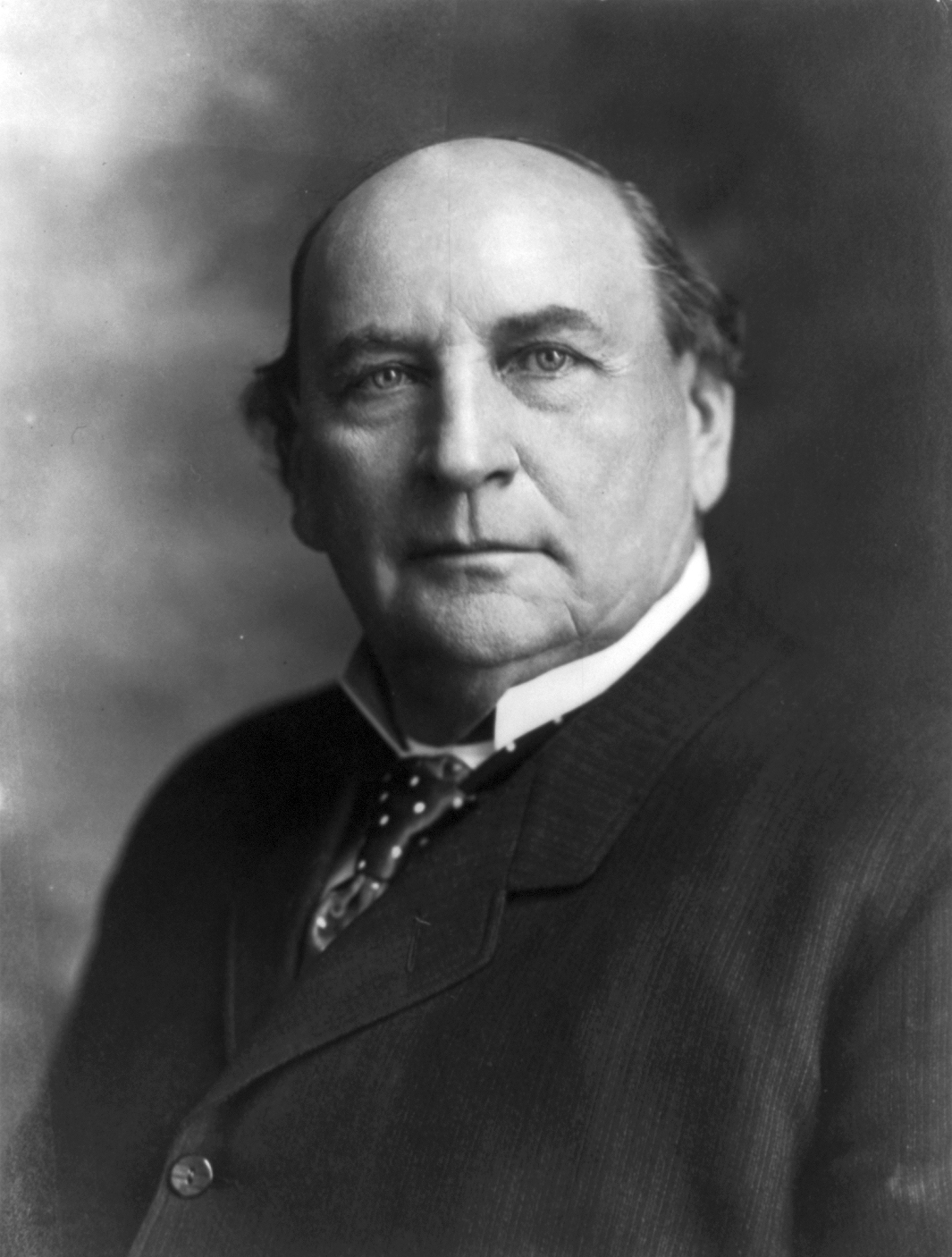
Senator John H. Bankhead

Democrat John H. Bankhead was re-elected early, on January 17, 1911, for the 1913 term.

== California ==
Incumbent Senator Frank P. Flint, who had been elected in 1905, retired. Republican John D. Works received a plurality of votes cast at a Republican state primary. Republican A. G. Spalding, however, carried a majority of the legislative districts represented by Republicans. In the legislature, Works was elected on January 10, 1911, with 92 votes over Spalding's 21 votes, and a scattering of votes for various Democrats.

== Connecticut ==
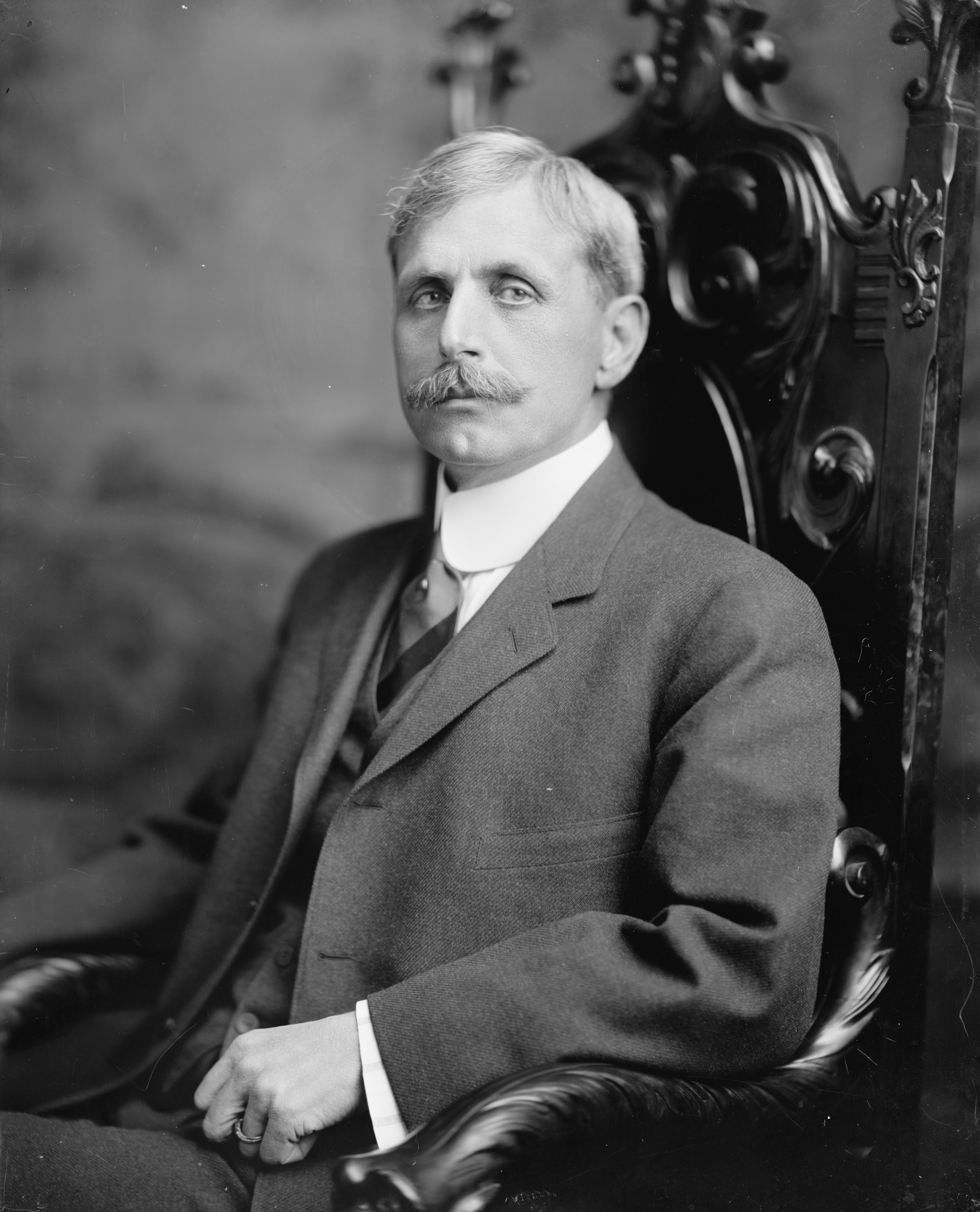
Senator George P. McLean

Republican incumbent Morgan Bulkeley, who had been elected in 1905, lost renomination in a Republican legislative caucus 113–64 to George P. McLean.

McLean was then elected on January 17, 1911, with 177 votes to Democrat Homer Stille Cummings's 110 votes.

== Delaware ==
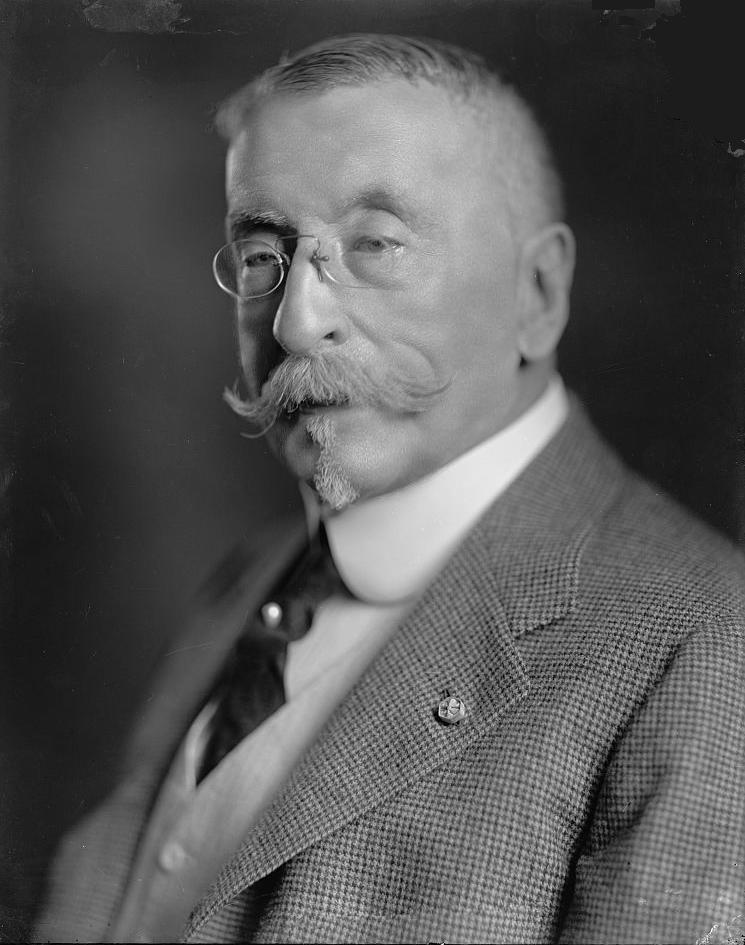
Senator Henry A. du Pont

First-term Republican Henry A. du Pont was re-elected on January 25, 1911. He beat Democrat Willard Saulsbury Jr.

- ✓ Henry A. du Pont (Republican) 31 votes
- Willard Saulsbury Jr. (Democratic) 21 votes

Saulsbury would be elected in 1913 to the other Delaware senate seat. Du Pont would lose re-election in 1916, the first popular Senate election in Delaware.

== Florida ==
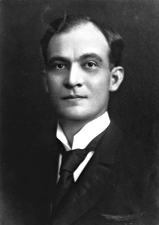
Senator Nathan P. Bryan

In June 1910, incumbent Democrat James Taliaferro lost a non-binding primary to former Governor Napoleon B. Broward for the term which started on March 4, 1911. Broward died in October. In early February 1911, Nathan P. Bryan won a non-binding primary for the seat, defeating William A. Blount 19,991 to 19,381. The governor then appointed Bryan to fill the vacancy.

In April 1911, the Florida Legislature unanimously elected Bryan to the remainder of the term.

== Georgia (special) ==
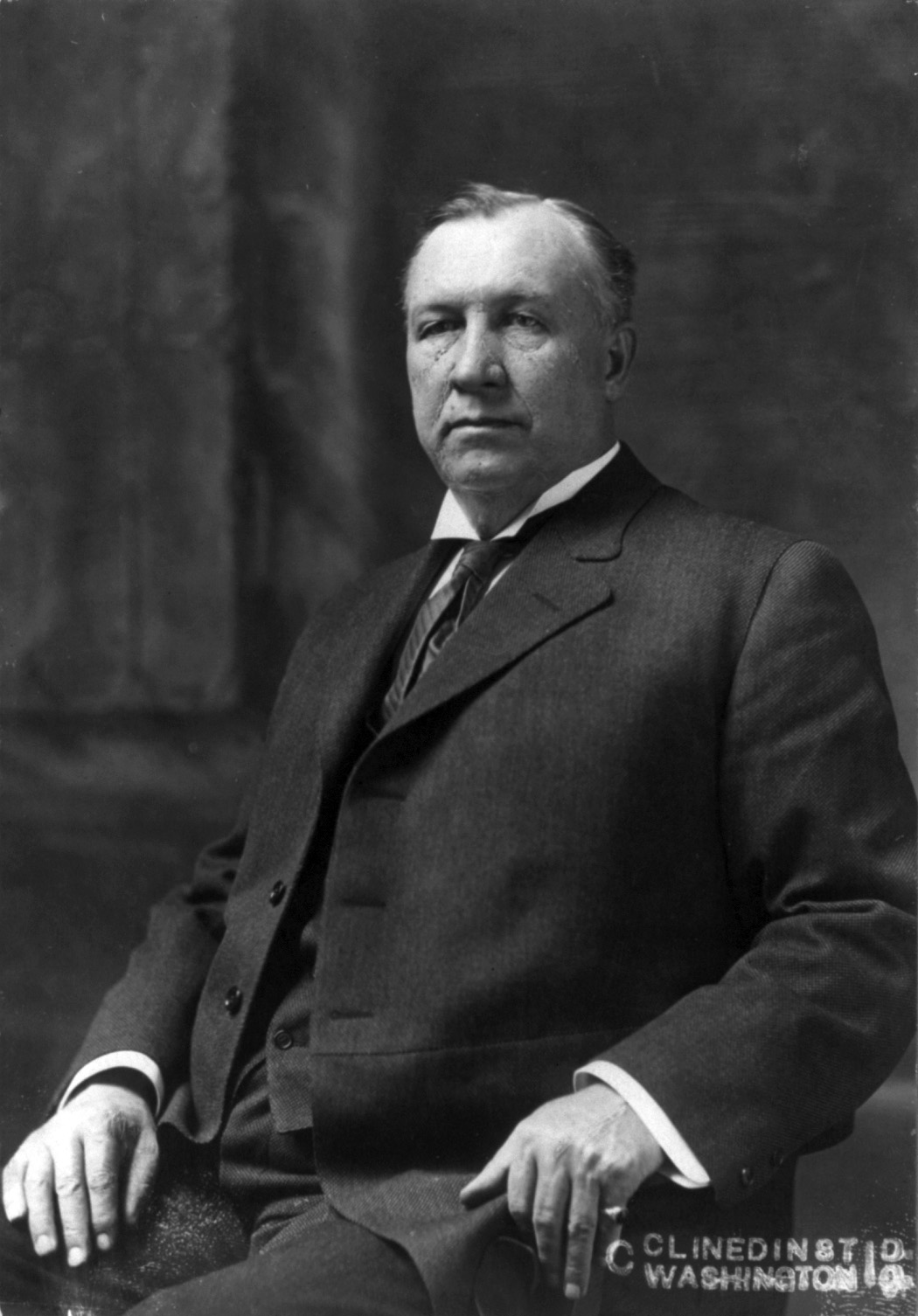
Senator M. Hoke Smith

Three-term Democrat Alexander S. Clay died on November 13, 1910, and Democratic former-Governor of Georgia Joseph M. Terrell was appointed on November 17, 1910, to continue the term, pending a special election.

Democratic Governor of Georgia M. Hoke Smith won the July 12, 1911, special election to finish the term that would end in 1915.

- ✓ M. Hoke Smith (Democratic) 155 votes
- Joseph M. Terrell (Democratic) 51 votes
- W.A. Covington (Democratic) 6 votes
- Thomas E. Watson 7 votes
- John M. Holder (Democratic) 1 vote

Smith had just begun his gubernatorial term on July 1, 1911, when he was elected to the Senate. Although formally elected and qualified, Smith chose not to take office until November 16, 1911, so he could continue being governor of Georgia.

Smith would be re-elected in 1914 and would serve through 1921.

== Maryland ==
1910 United States Senate election in Maryland
- February 1, 1910

80 members of the Maryland General Assembly
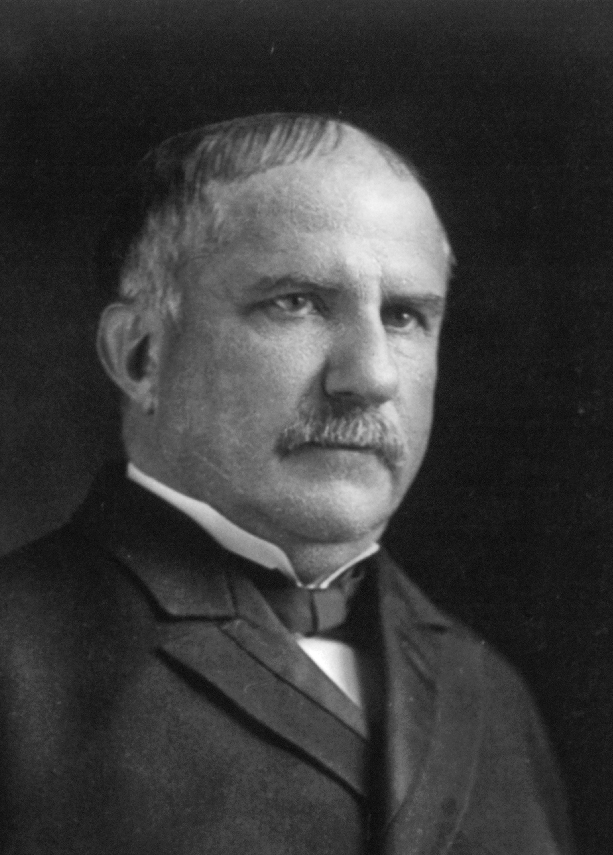
Candidate	Isidor Rayner
Party	Democratic
Legislative vote	80
Percentage	70.49%

Isidor Rayner won election by an unknown margin for the Class 1 seat.

== Mississippi ==
=== Mississippi (regular) ===
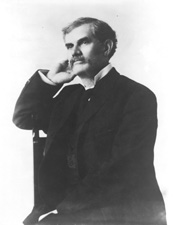
Senator John Sharp Williams

Three-term Democrat Hernando Money retired from the class 1 seat. In 1908, the Mississippi legislature had already unanimously elected Democratic Congressman John Sharp Williams early for the next term.

=== Mississippi (special) ===
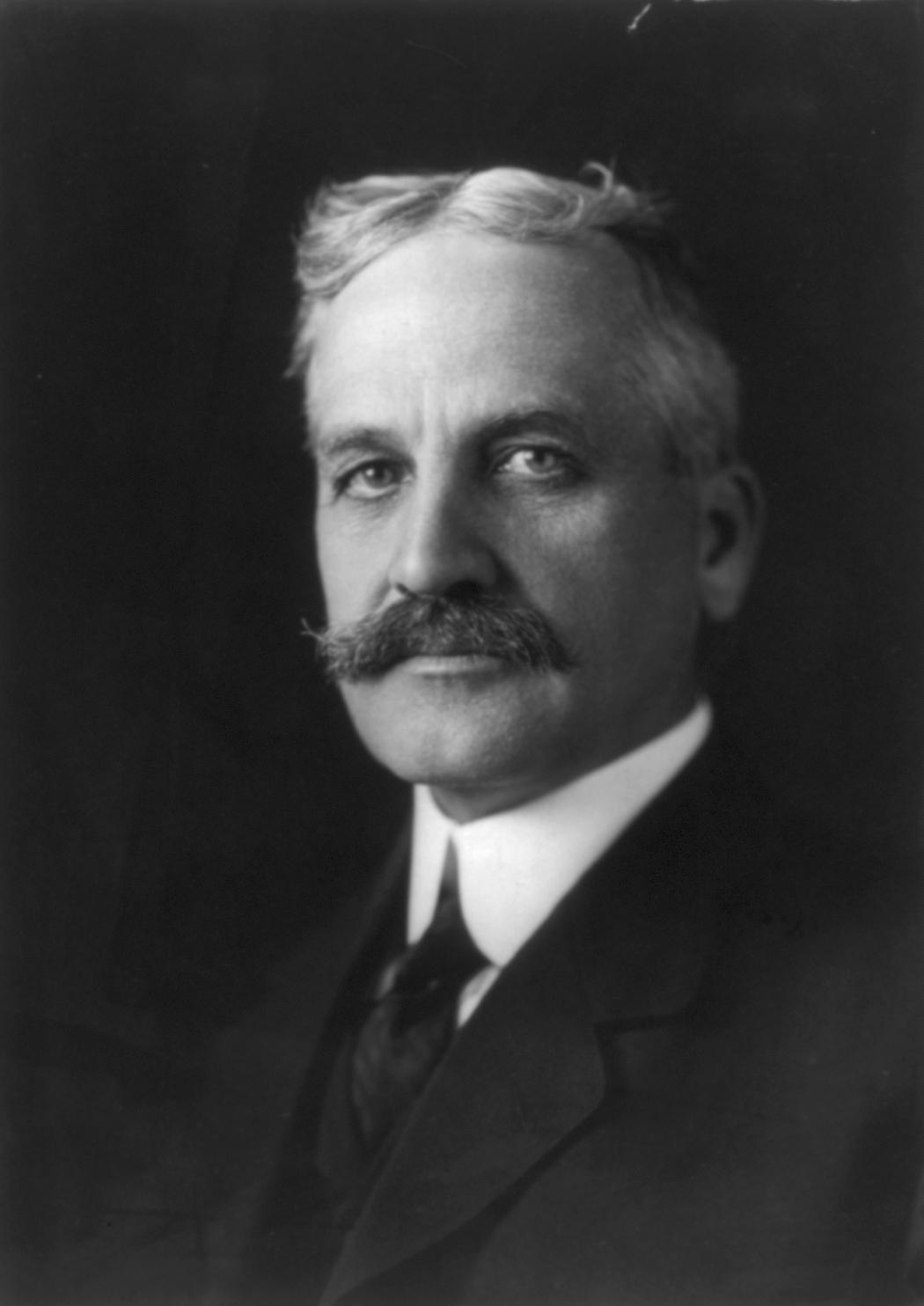
Senator LeRoy Percy

Three-term Democrat Anselm J. McLaurin died on December 22, 1909, and Democrat James Gordon was appointed on December 27, 1909, to continue the term pending a special election, in which he was not a candidate. The day after his appointment to the class 2 seat, he was identified as a former fugitive who had been sought as a suspect in the conspiracy to assassinate President Abraham Lincoln. Gordon was listed in 1865 by the United States government as a fugitive, and a reward of $10,000 had been offered for his capture, dead or alive. Later that year, he was ruled out of the suspects. Gordon then admitted that he had met with John Wilkes Booth in Montreal in March 1865, and had discussed plans to kidnap Lincoln, but denied any discussion of murder.

A plurality of legislators backed the white supremacist James K. Vardaman, but the fractured remainder sought to thwart his extreme racial policies. A majority united behind Percy to block Vardaman, instead electing Democrat LeRoy Percy February 23, 1910, to finish the term that would end in 1913.

Percy would lose renomination in 1912 to the next term.

== Montana ==
Democrat Henry L. Myers was elected on the 80th joint ballot by the Montana state legislature, winning 53 votes to incumbent Republican Thomas H. Carter's 45. Carter had led on the first ballot with 31 votes to Democrat Thomas J. Walsh's 28.

== Nebraska ==
Democratic nominee Gilbert Hitchcock defeated Republican incumbent Senator Elmer Burkett by a very narrow margin of 9.16%. Gilbert Hitchcock was the first Democrat ever to have won a United States Senate seat from Nebraska and he was the first non-Republican to have won a United States Senate seat from Nebraska since William Vincent Allen in 1893.

== New York ==
New York election
- January 17 – March 31, 1911

201 members of the New York Assembly 101 votes needed to win
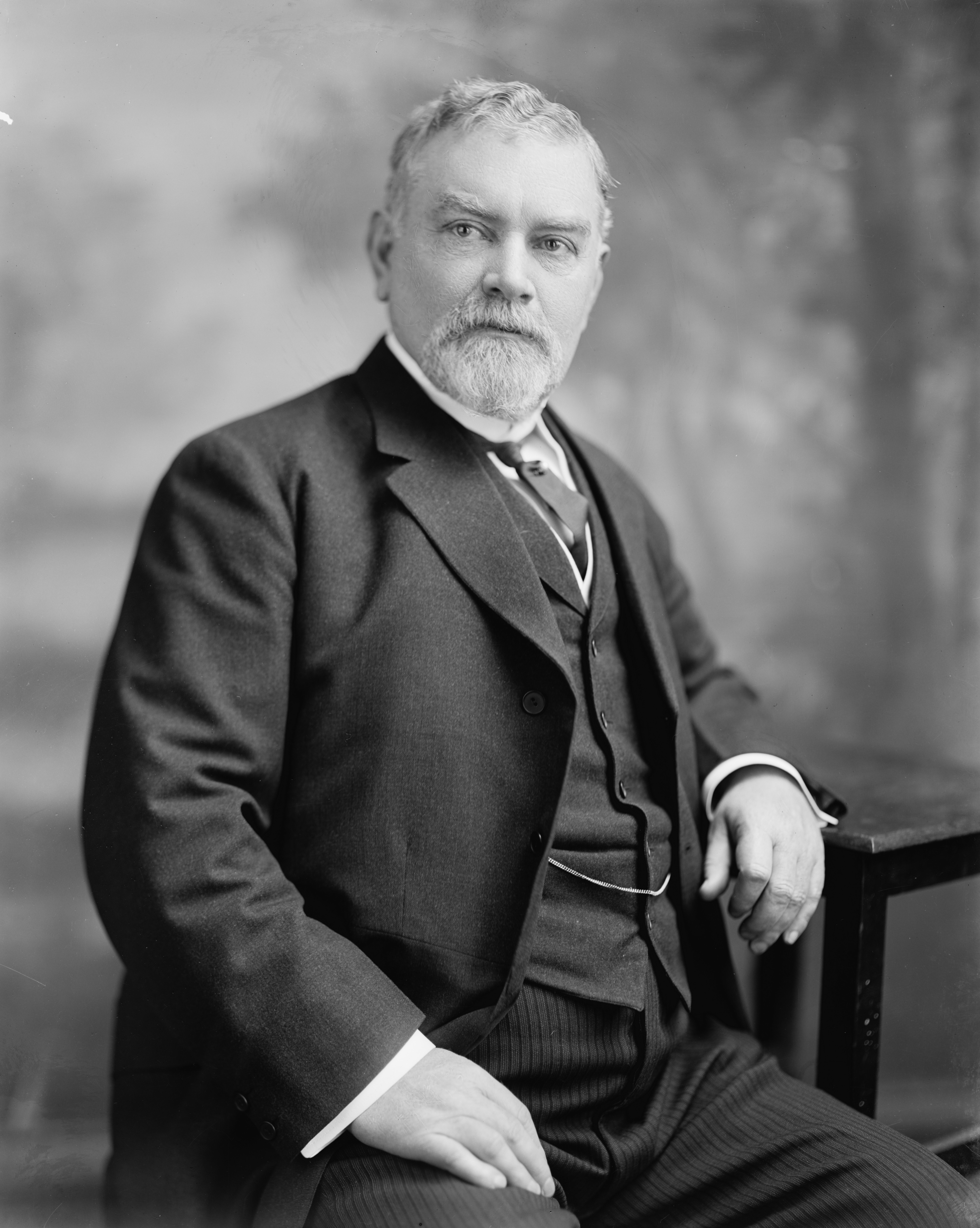

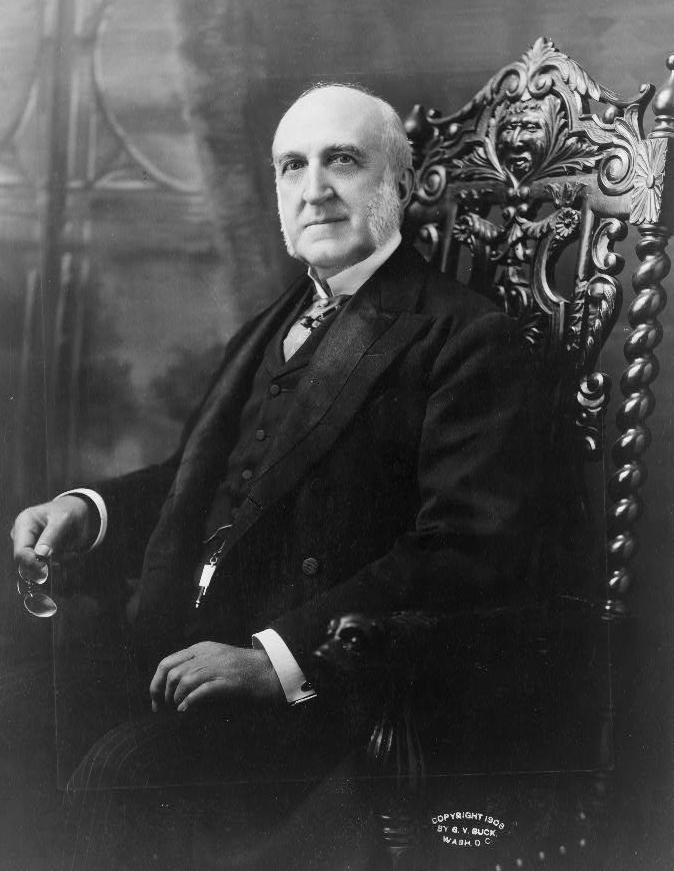
Nominee	James A. O'Gorman	Chauncey Depew
Party	Democratic	Republican
Electoral vote	112	80
Percentage	58.33%	41.67%
U.S. senator before election
Chauncey Depew
Republican
Elected U.S. senator
James A. O'Gorman
Democratic

Republican incumbent Chauncey M. Depew had been re-elected to this seat in 1905, and his term would expire on March 3, 1911. At the state election in November 1910, John Alden Dix was elected governor, the first Democrat to hold the position since 1894. Democrats also unexpectedly carried the state legislative elections, and controlled both the Senate and the Assembly. The 134th New York State Legislature met from January 4 to October 6, 1911, in Albany, New York. Democratic Ex-Lieutenant Governor William F. Sheehan announced his candidacy on December 30, 1910. Before the state election, when a Democratic victory seemed to be improbable, Sheehan had made an agreement with Tammany Hall leader Charles Francis Murphy that the Tammany men would support Sheehan for the U.S. Senate. The Democratic caucus met on January 16 and nominated Sheehan over Edward M. Shepard and D. Cady Herrick. The Republican caucus met on January 16 and re-nominated Chauncey M. Depew unanimously.

From January 17 through March 3, the legislature was deadlocked through 39 ballots, with anti-Tammany Democrats led by newly elected State Senator Franklin Delano Roosevelt refusing to support Sheehan. On March 3, 1911, Depew's term ended.

The deadlock continued over another 19 ballots despite the vacant seat. Democrats then held a new caucus and nominated James A. O'Gorman, a justice of the New York Supreme Court. O'Gorman was elected over Depew on March 31, 1911.

Candidate	Party	64th joint ballot Mar 31
Chauncey M. Depew	Republican	80
✓ James A. O'Gorman	Democratic	✓ 112

== North Dakota ==
=== North Dakota (special) ===
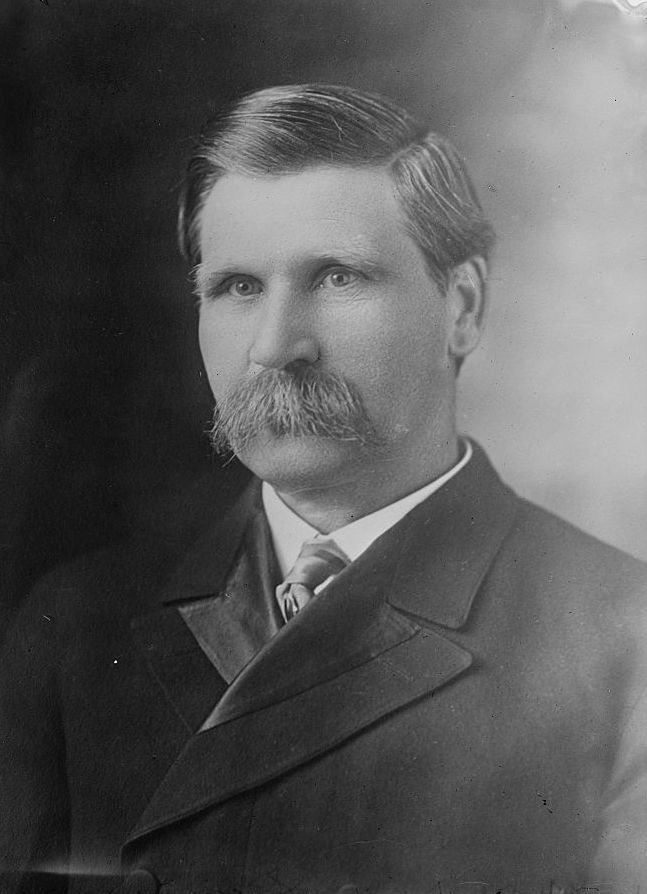
Senator Asle Gronna

=== North Dakota (regular) ===
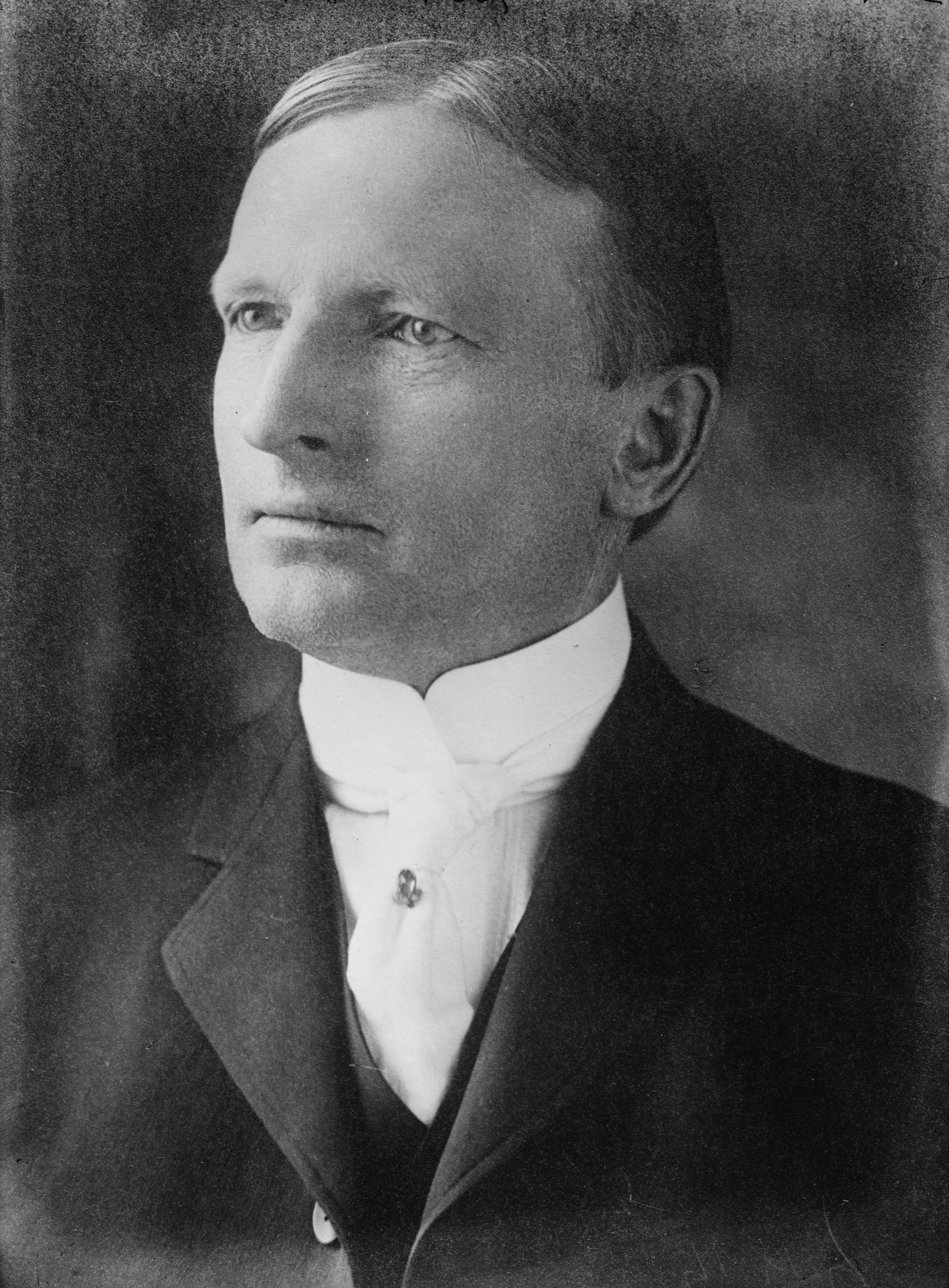
Senator Porter J. McCumber

== Pennsylvania ==
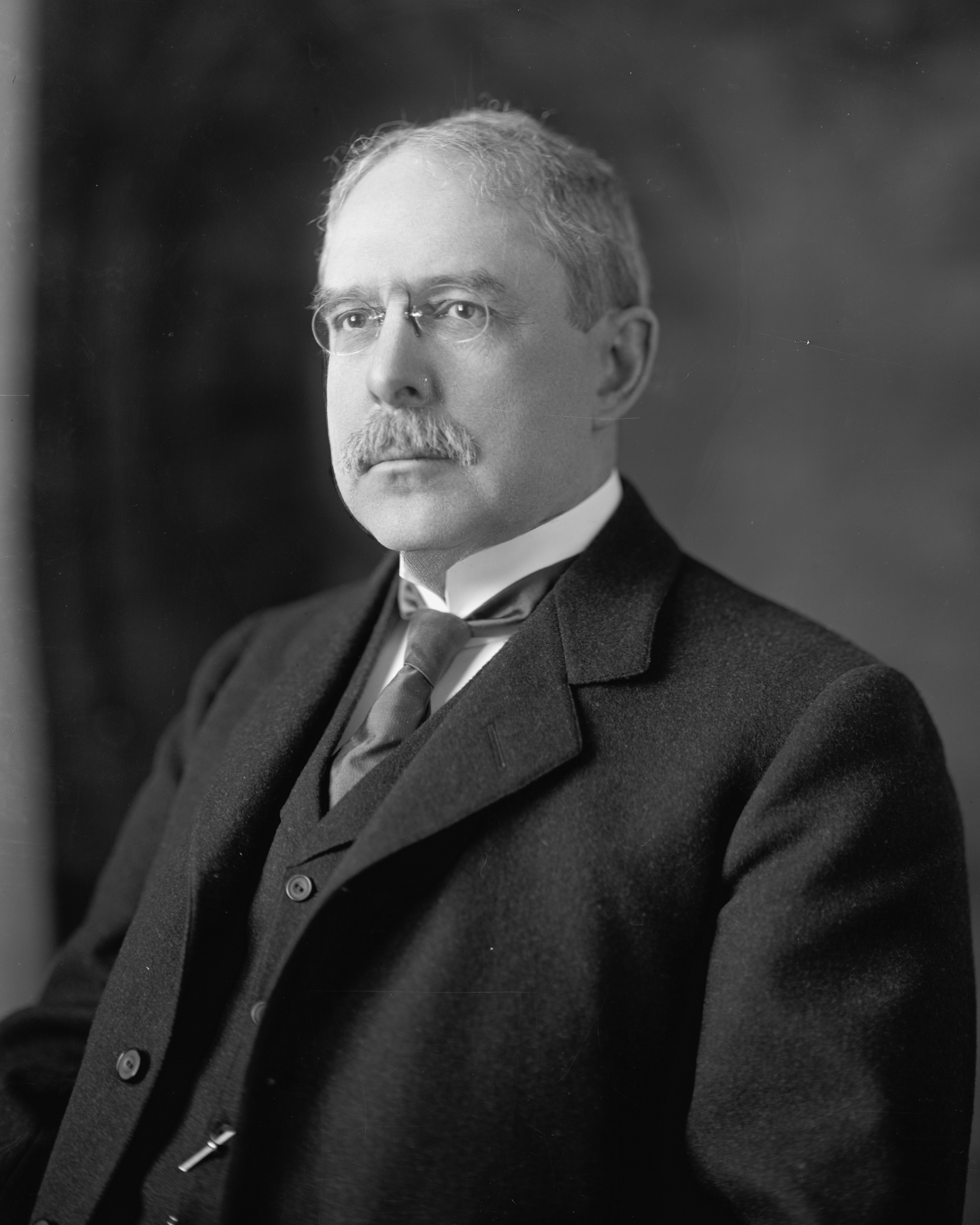
Senator George T. Oliver

The Pennsylvania election was held January 17, 1911. Incumbent George T. Oliver was re-elected by the Pennsylvania General Assembly.

Pennsylvania election, January 17, 1911
Party	Candidate	Votes	%
Republican	George T. Oliver (incumbent)	181	70.43%
Democratic	J. Henry Cochran	35	13.62%
Democratic	Julian Kennedy	25	9.73%
Democratic	James B. Riley	3	1.17%
Republican	William Flinn	2	0.78%
Democratic	William H. Berry	1	0.39%
Democratic	George W. Guthrie	1	0.39%
Socialist	Joseph E. Cohen	1	0.39%
N/A	Not voting	8	3.11%
Total votes		257	100%

== West Virginia ==
=== West Virginia (regular) ===
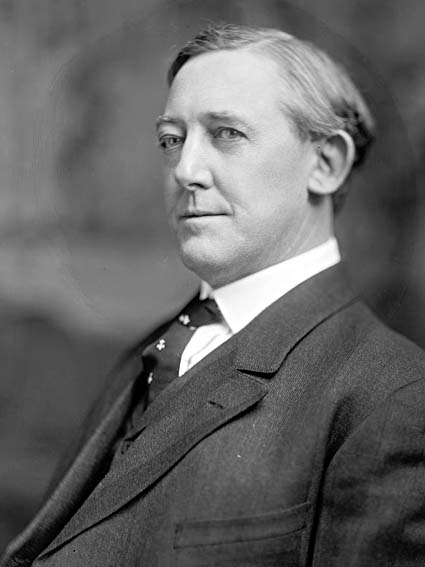
Senator William E. Chilton

=== West Virginia (special) ===
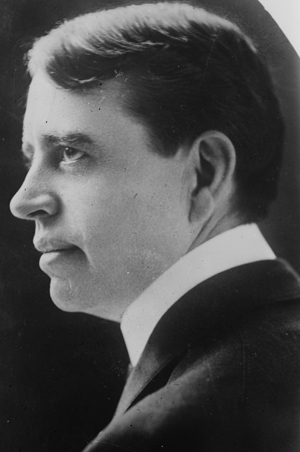
Senator Clarence Wayland Watson

== Wisconsin ==
State	Incumbent			Results	Candidates
State	Senator	Party	Electoral history	Results	Candidates
Wisconsin (Class 1)	Robert M. La Follette	Republican	1905	Incumbent re-elected January 25, 1911.	▌ ✓ Robert M. La Follette (Republican) 64.34%; ▌ Charles H. Weisse (Democratic) 24.03%; ▌ John C. Kleist (Social Dem.) 10.85%; ▌ F. C. Winkler (Republican) 0.78%; ▌ John V. Collins (Prohibition) 0.00%; Absent 3%

== See also ==
- 1910 United States elections
  - 1910 United States House of Representatives elections
- 61st United States Congress
- 62nd United States Congress

== Sources ==
- Byrd, Robert C. (October 1, 1993). Wolff, Wendy (ed.). The Senate, 1789-1989: Historical Statistics, 1789-1992. United States Senate Historical Office (volume 4 Bicentennial ed.). Washington, D.C.: U.S. Government Printing Office. ISBN 9780160632563 – via Google Books.
- Cox, Harold (January 31, 2007). "Pennsylvania Election Statistics: 1682-2006". The Wilkes University Election Statistics Project. Wilkes University.
- "Party Division in the Senate, 1789-Present". United States Senate – via Senate.gov.
- Rhoades, Henry Eckford; McPherson, Edward; Schem, A. J.; Ottarson, F. J.; Cleveland, John F.; Greeley, Horace (1911). "United States Senators Chosen, 1910". The Tribune Almanac and Political Register 1911. New York: The Tribune Association. pp. 439–440 – via HathiTrust Digital Library.
- Rhoades, Henry Eckford; McPherson, Edward; Schem, A. J.; Ottarson, F. J.; Cleveland, John F.; Greeley, Horace (1912). "United States Senators Chosen, 1911". The Tribune Almanac and Political Register 1912. New York: The Tribune Association. pp. 455–458. hdl:2027/hvd.32044015182322 – via HathiTrust Digital Library.
