= Secretary Knox =

Secretary Knox may refer to:

- Frank Knox, U.S. Secretary of the Navy (1940–1944)
- Henry Knox, U.S. Secretary of War (1785-1794)
- Philander C. Knox, U.S. Secretary of State (1909–1913)
