= 1909 United States Senate special election in Pennsylvania =

- March 16, 1909
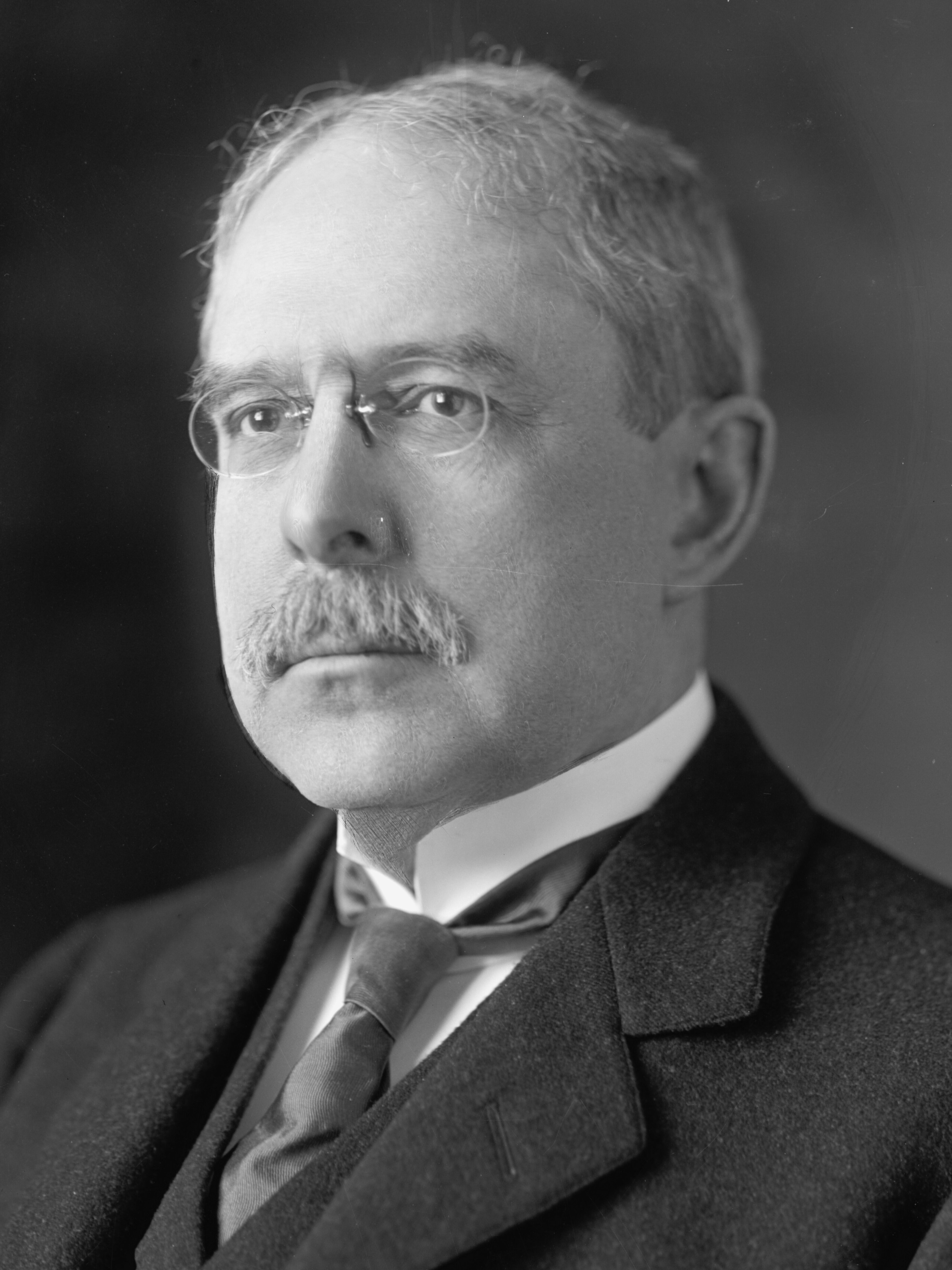

Nominee	George T. Oliver	Webster Grim
Party	Republican	Democratic
Leg. vote	201	39
Percentage	78.21%	15.18%
U.S. senator before election
Philander C. Knox
Republican
Elected U.S. Senator
George T. Oliver
Republican

The 1909 United States Senate special election in Pennsylvania was held on March 16, 1909. George T. Oliver was elected by the Pennsylvania General Assembly to the United States Senate.

== Background ==
Republican Philander C. Knox was appointed to the United States Senate in June 1904 after the death of Matthew Quay. Knox was subsequently elected to a full term in the Senate by the Pennsylvania General Assembly, consisting of the House of Representatives and the Senate, in January 1905. Knox served in the U.S. Senate until his resignation on March 4, 1909, to become United States Secretary of State in the William Howard Taft administration, leaving the seat vacant until a successor was elected.

== Results ==
Following the resignation of Sen. Philander C. Knox, the Pennsylvania General Assembly convened on March 16, 1909, to elect a new senator to fill the vacancy. The results of the vote of both houses combined are as follows:

State legislature results
Party	Candidate	Votes	%
Republican	George T. Oliver	201	78.21
Democratic	Webster Grim	39	15.18
Unknown	Nathaniel Ewing	1	0.39
N/A	Not voting	16	6.23
Totals		257	100.00%

== See also ==
- 1908–09 United States Senate elections

Preceded by 1905	Pennsylvania U.S. Senate election (Class I); 1909	Succeeded by 1911
