= 1905 United States Senate election in Pennsylvania =

The 1905 United States Senate election in Pennsylvania was held on January 17, 1905. Incumbent Philander C. Knox was elected by the Pennsylvania State Assembly to his first full term in the United States Senate.

== Background ==
Republican Matthew Quay was elected by the Pennsylvania General Assembly to the United States Senate in the previous election in January 1901. He served until his death on May 28, 1904. In June 1904, Republican Philander C. Knox was appointed to serve out the remainder of Quay's term, ending on March 4, 1905, when he began a term in his own right.

== Results ==
The Pennsylvania General Assembly, consisting of the House of Representatives and Senate, convened on January 17, 1905, to elect a senator to serve the term beginning on March 4, 1905. The results of the vote of both houses combined are as follows:

State legislature results
Party	Candidate	Votes	%
Republican	Philander C. Knox (Inc.)	222	87.40
Democratic	James K. P. Hall	23	9.06
N/A	Not voting	9	3.54
Totals		254	100.00%

== See also ==
- 1904–05 United States Senate elections

Preceded by 1901	Pennsylvania U.S. Senate election (Class I); 1905	Succeeded by 1909
