= 1911 United States Senate election in Pennsylvania =

- January 17, 1911
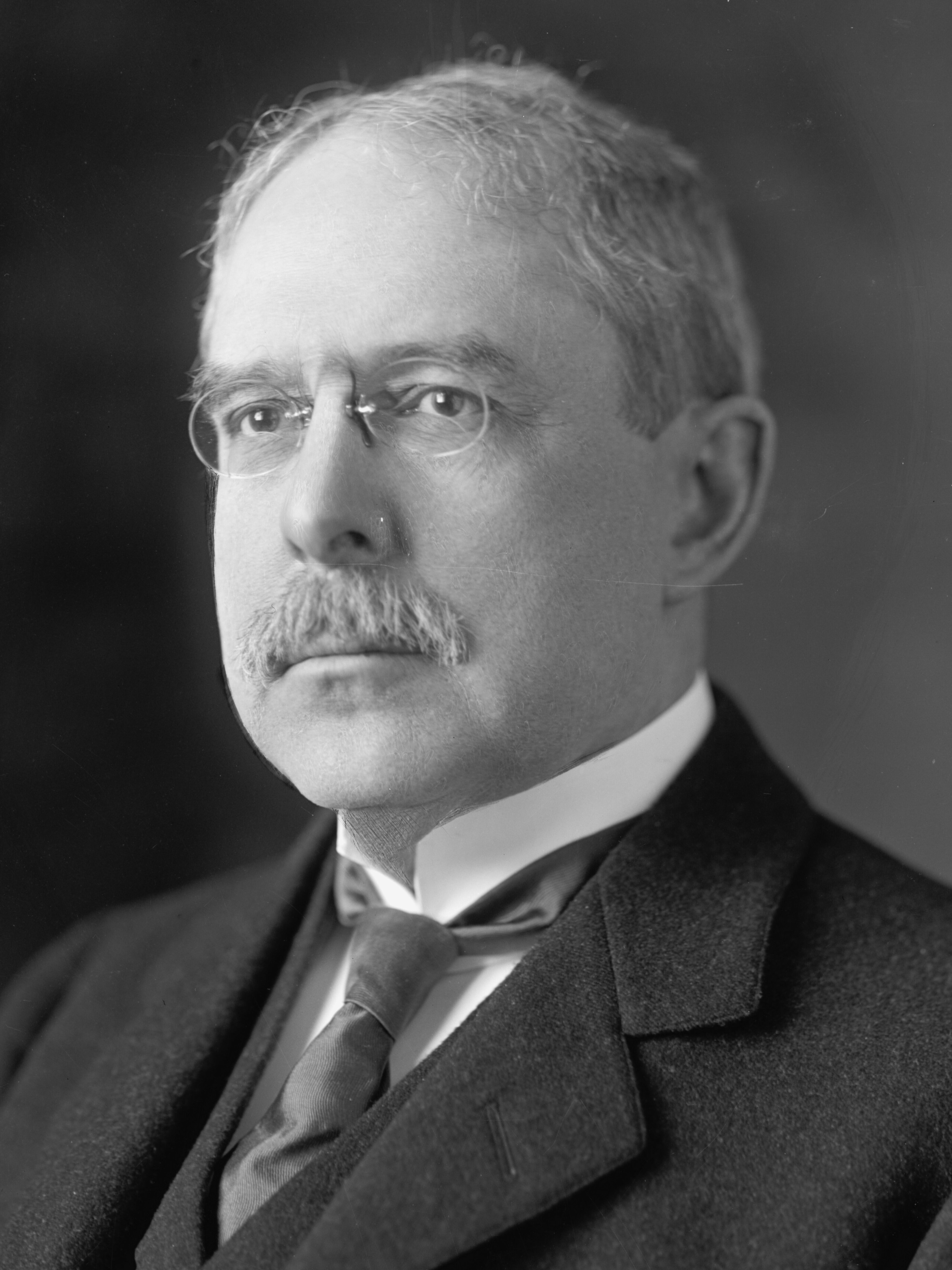

Nominee	George T. Oliver	J. Henry Cochran	Julian Kennedy
Party	Republican	Democratic	Democratic
Leg. vote	181	35	25
Percentage	70.43%	13.62%	9.73%
U.S. senator before election
George T. Oliver
Republican
Elected U.S. Senator
George T. Oliver
Republican

The 1911 United States Senate election in Pennsylvania was held on January 17, 1911. Incumbent George T. Oliver was re-elected by the Pennsylvania General Assembly to the United States Senate. This was the last U.S. Senate election to be decided by the Pennsylvania General Assembly before the ratification of the 17th Amendment to the U.S. Constitution, which mandated the direct election of U.S. senators.

== Results ==
The Pennsylvania General Assembly, consisting of the House of Representatives and the Senate, convened on January 17, 1911, to elect a senator to serve the term beginning on March 4, 1911. The results of the vote of both houses combined are as follows:

State legislature results
Party	Candidate	Votes	%
Republican	George T. Oliver (Inc.)	181	70.43
Democratic	J. Henry Cochran	35	13.62
Democratic	Julian Kennedy	25	9.73
Democratic	James B. Riley	3	1.17
Republican	William Flinn	2	0.78
Democratic	William H. Berry	1	0.39
Democratic	George W. Guthrie	1	0.39
Socialist	Joseph E. Cohen	1	0.39
N/A	Not voting	8	3.11
Totals		257	100.00%

== See also ==
- 1910–11 United States Senate elections

Preceded by 1909	Pennsylvania U.S. Senate election (Class I); 1911	Succeeded by 1916
