= 1905 United States Senate election in California =

- January 11, 1905

Majority vote of each house needed to win
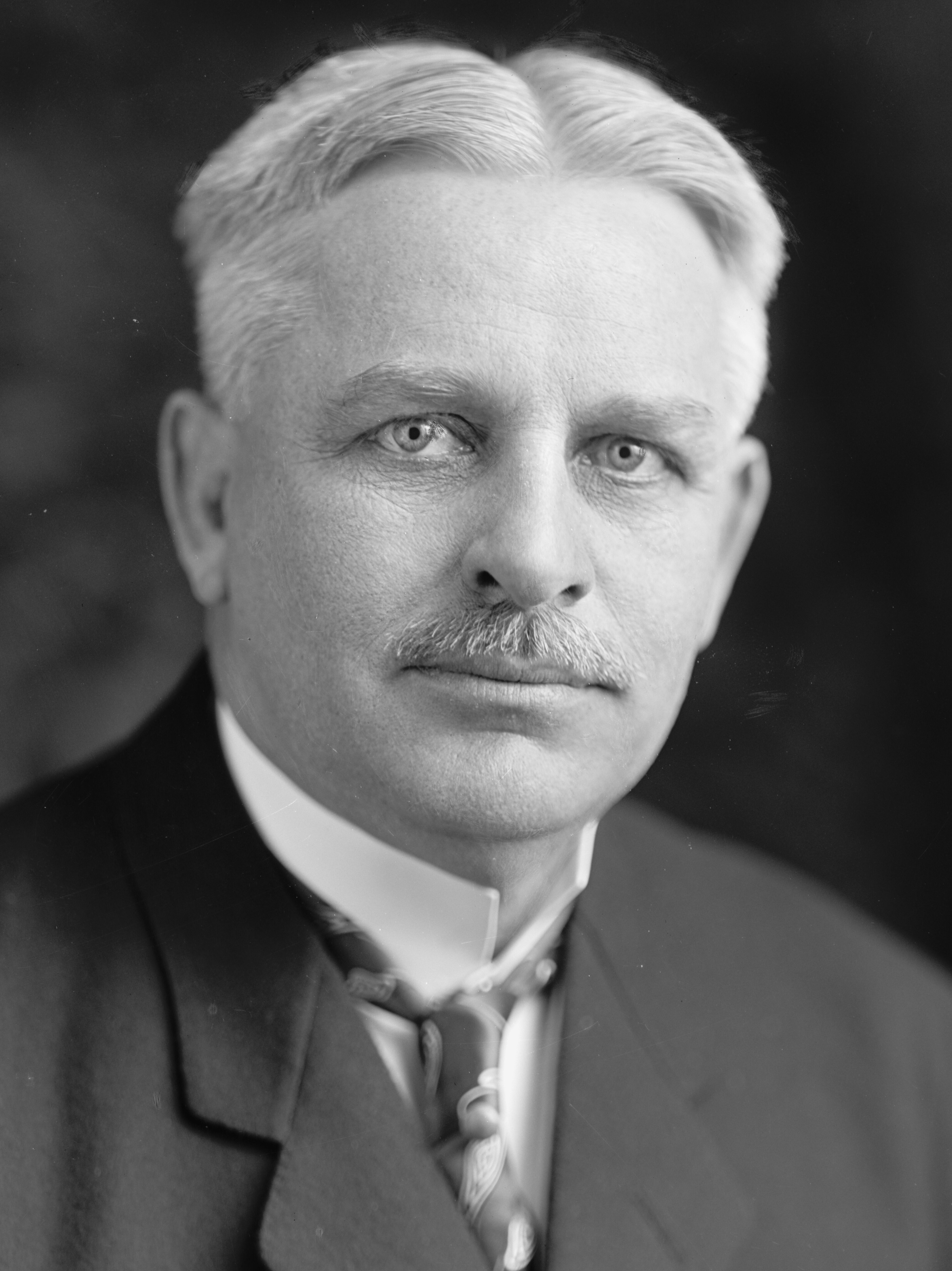

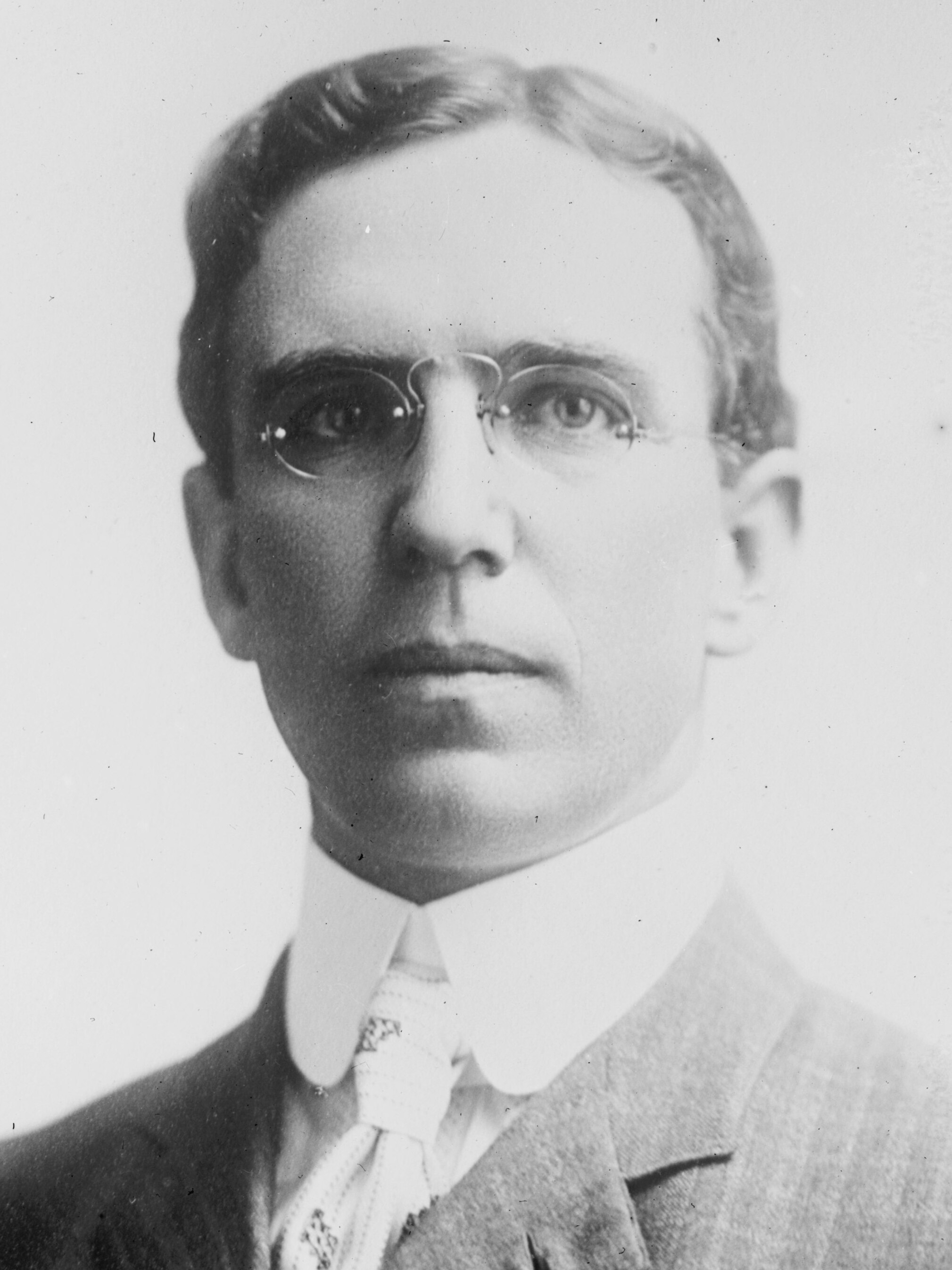
Nominee	Frank P. Flint	Theodore A. Bell
Party	Republican	Democratic
Senate	36	4
Percentage	90.00%	10.00%
House	75	4
Percentage	94.94%	5.06%
Senator before election
Thomas R. Bard
Republican
Elected Senator
Frank P. Flint
Republican

The 1905 United States Senate election in California was held on January 11, 1905, by the California State Legislature to elect a U.S. senator (Class 1) to represent the State of California in the United States Senate. Republican United States District Attorney Frank P. Flint was elected over Democratic Congressman Theodore A. Bell.

== Results ==
Election in the Senate
Party	Candidate	Votes	%
Republican	John D. Works	36	90.00%
Democratic	Theodore A. Bell	4	10.00%
Total votes		40	100.00%

Election in the Assembly
Party	Candidate	Votes	%
Republican	John D. Works	75	94.94%
Democratic	Theodore A. Bell	4	5.06%
Total votes		79	100.00%
