= George T. Oliver =

American journalist

George Tener Oliver
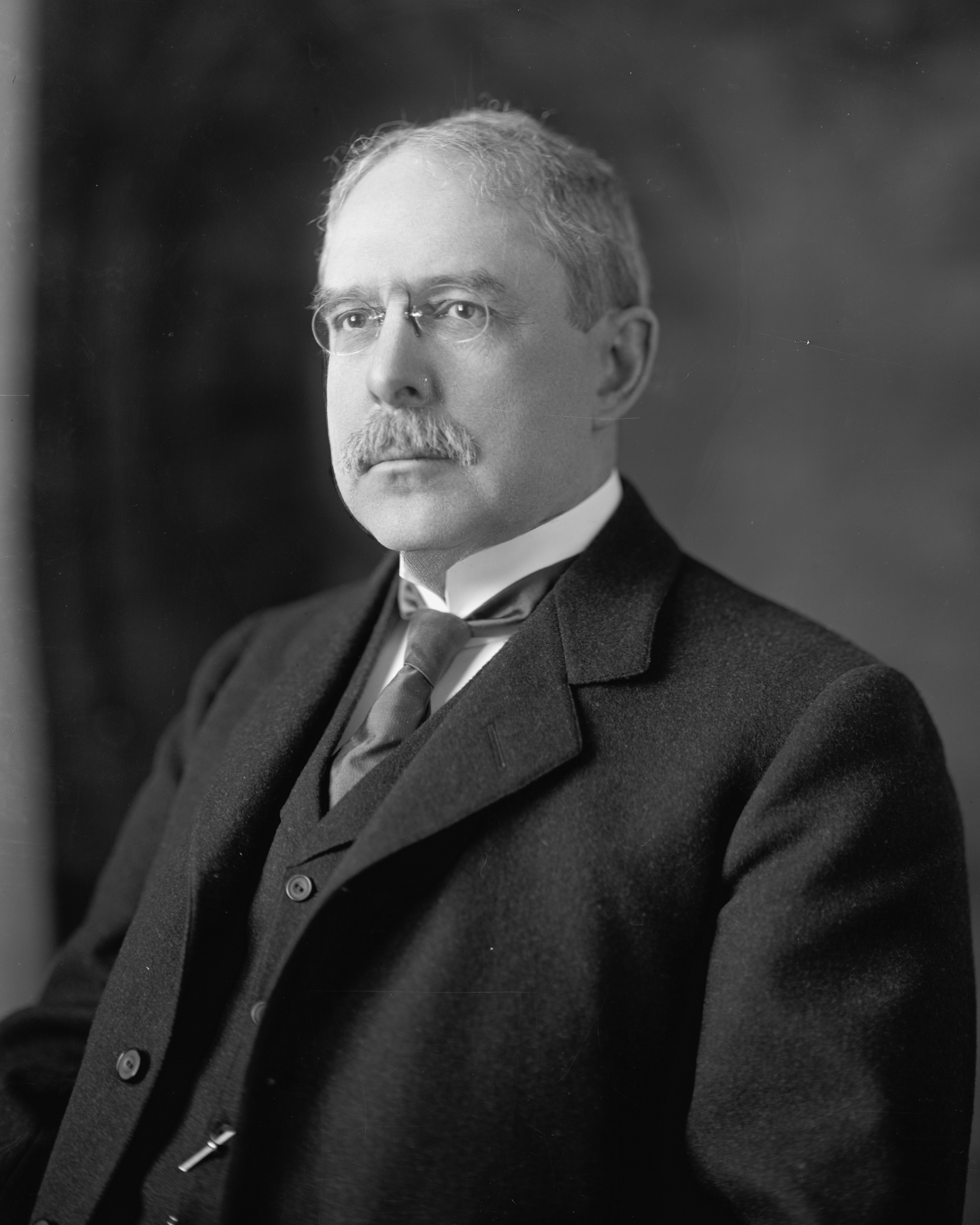

United States Senator from Pennsylvania
- In office March 17, 1909 – March 4, 1917
- Preceded by: Philander C. Knox
- Succeeded by: Philander C. Knox

Personal details
- Born: January 26, 1848 County Tyrone, Ireland
- Died: January 22, 1919 (aged 70) Pittsburgh, Pennsylvania
- Party: Republican

George Tener Oliver (January 26, 1848 – January 22, 1919) was an American lawyer, publisher, and Republican party politician from Pittsburgh, Pennsylvania. He represented Pennsylvania in the United States Senate from 1909 until 1917.

== Early life, education, and career ==
He was born in Dungannon, Ireland, while his parents were visiting there. After graduating from Bethany College, West Virginia (B.A., 1868; M.A.,1873) he studied law in an office in Pittsburgh, where he practiced from 1871 to 1881. He then engaged in the iron and steel industry, accumulating a large fortune. In 1900 Oliver separately purchased two Pittsburgh newspapers, the morning Commercial Gazette and evening Chronicle Telegraph, the former of which he merged six years later with The Pittsburg Times to form The Gazette Times.

== U.S. Senate ==
In 1909, he was elected to the U.S. Senate to serve out the term of Philander C. Knox, who had resigned to become Secretary of State under President Taft. Oliver was reelected to a full six-year term starting in 1911. As senator, he focused on tariff matters affecting the iron and steel industry, the chief employer in Pittsburgh. In 1911, he helped reverse the United States Board on Geographic Names decision to spell the name of Pittsburgh without the final h.

== Death and memorial ==
George T. Oliver died at his home in Pittsburgh on January 22, 1919, just 4 days shy of his 71st birthday.

He owned a summer estate named Dungannon Hall in Hamilton Twp, Ontario, just north of Cobourg. The sideroad south of the estate was named Oliver's Lane in memory. Although Dungannon Hall was lost to fire in the mid 20th century, the gates to the estate still stand at the western end of Oliver's Lane next to Ontario Street.

U.S. Senate
Preceded by Philander C. Knox	U.S. senator (Class 1) from Pennsylvania; 1909–1917; Served alongside: Boies Penrose	Succeeded by Philander C. Knox
