= WSRU =

Radio station at Slippery Rock University

Coordinates: 41.0620°N 80.0428°W

WSRU-FM
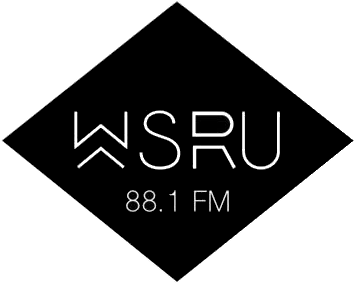
- Slippery Rock, Pennsylvania; United States
- Broadcast area: Slippery Rock University
- Frequency: 88.1 MHz
- Branding: WSRU 88.1 FM

Programming
- Format: College Variety

Ownership
- Owner: Slippery Rock University; (Slippery Rock Student Government Association, Inc.)

History
- Founded: 1960
- First air date: 1962
- Former call signs: WNFT (1962–1980); WRCK (1980–1991); WRSK (1991–2006)
- Call sign meaning: Slippery Rock University

Technical information
- Licensing authority: FCC
- Class: A
- ERP: 100 watts
- HAAT: 25 meters (82 ft)

Links
- Public license information: Public file; LMS
- Website: wsrufm.com

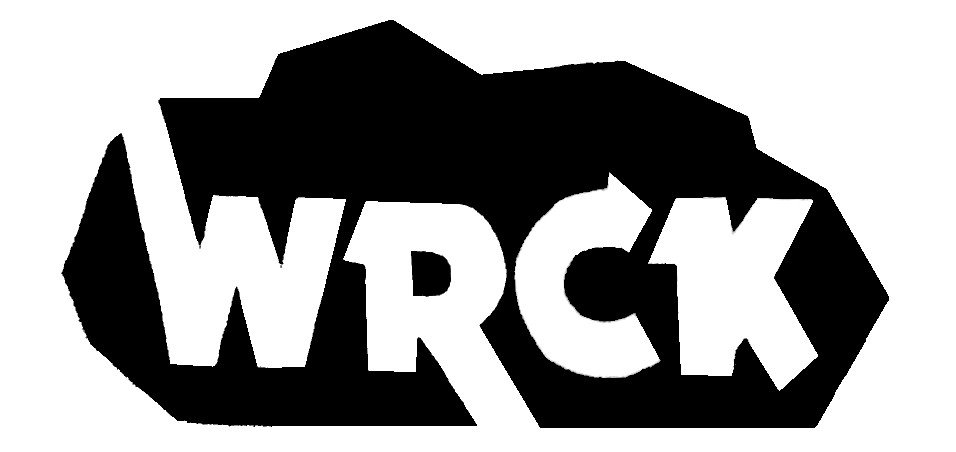
WRCK's only logo, 1980–1991

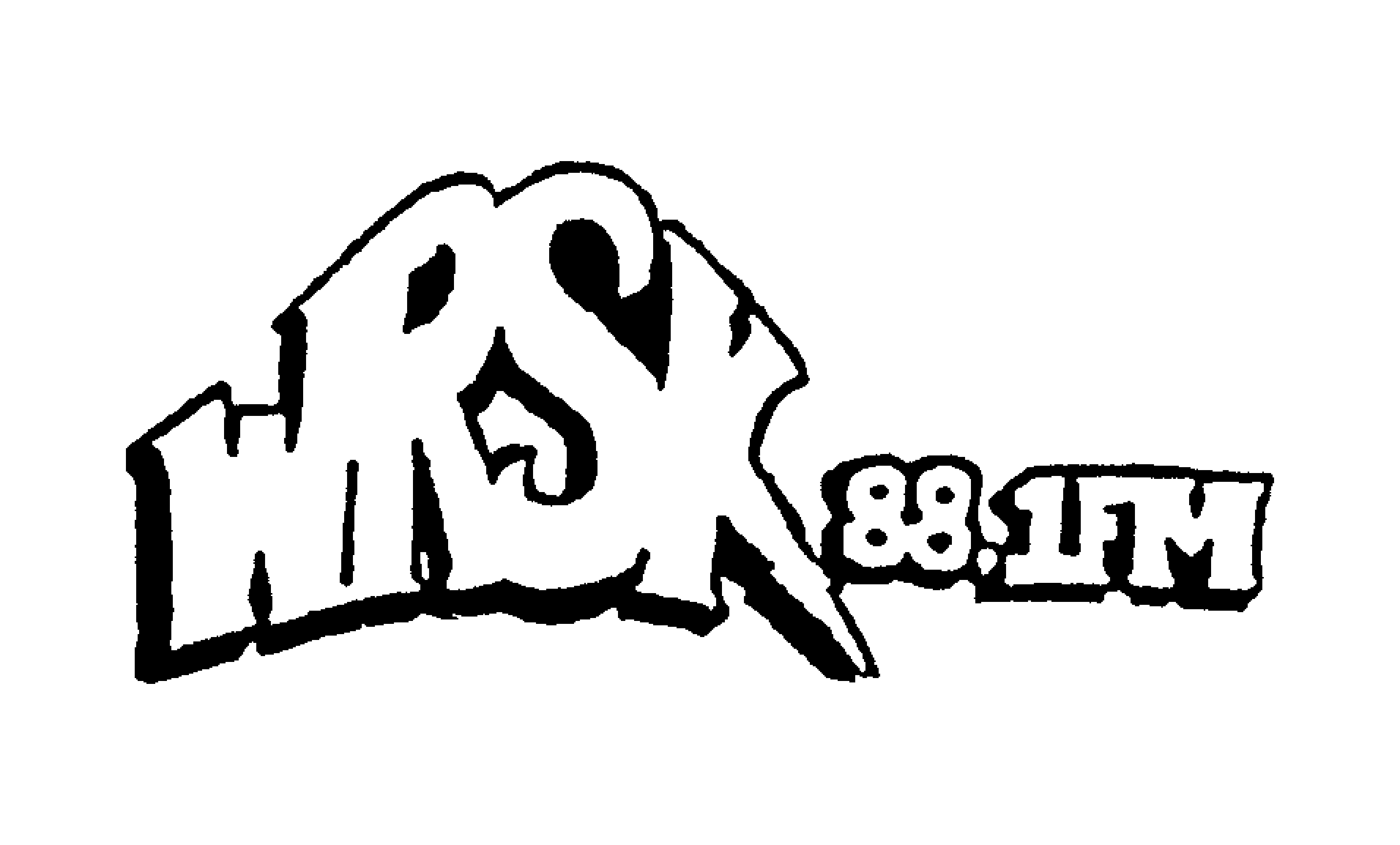
WRSK's first logo, used from 1991 to approximately 1994

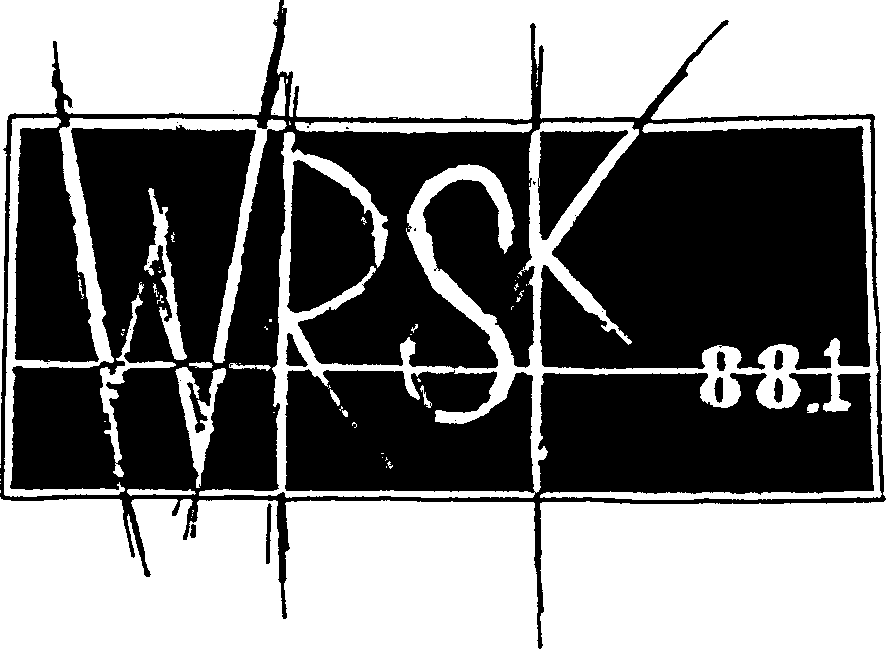
WRSK's "grunge" logo, 1996

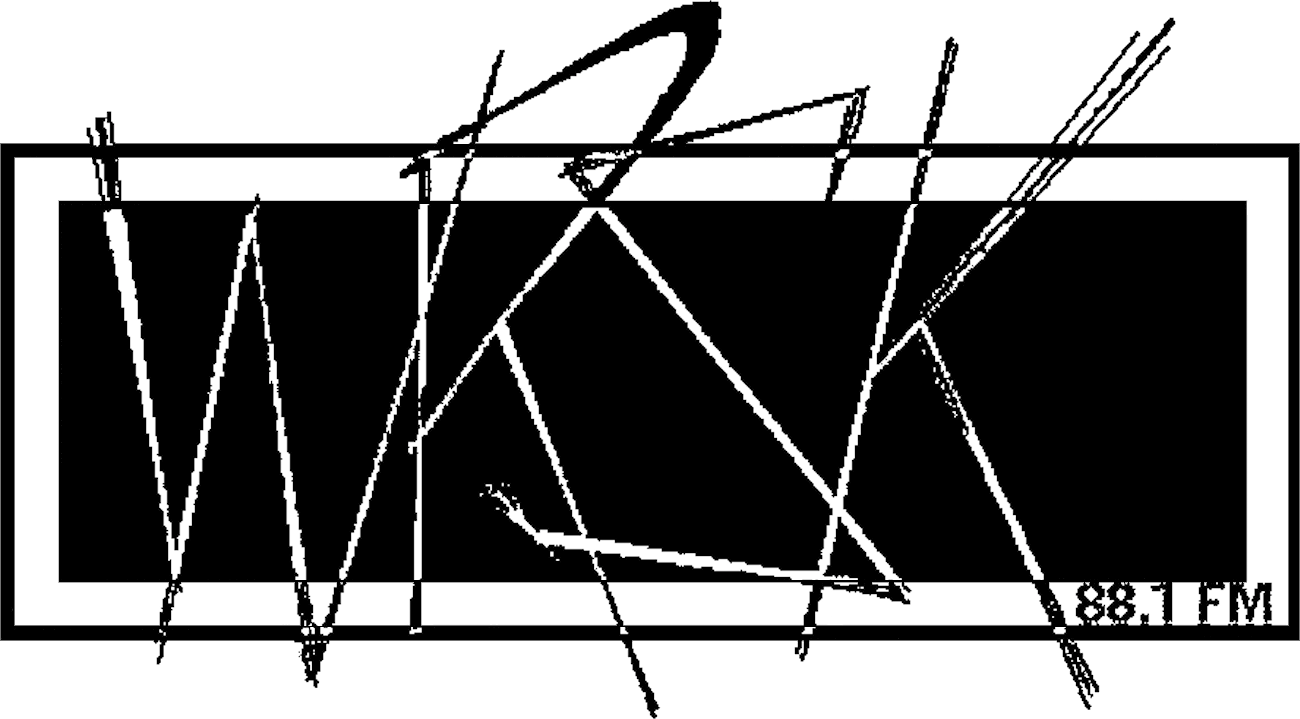
WRSK's logo, 1997. Frequently used in tandem with the 1996 "grunge" logo.

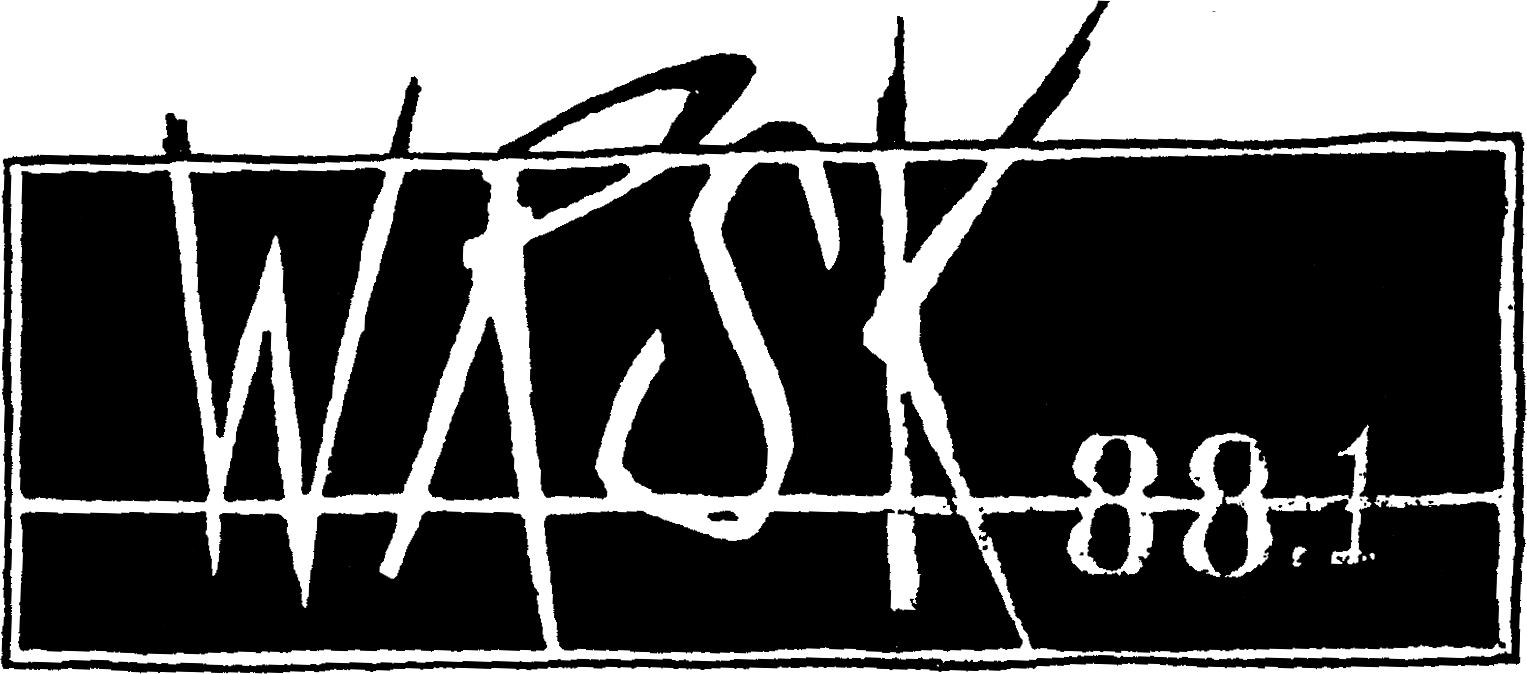
Alternative version, using elements from both the 1996 and 1997 logos.

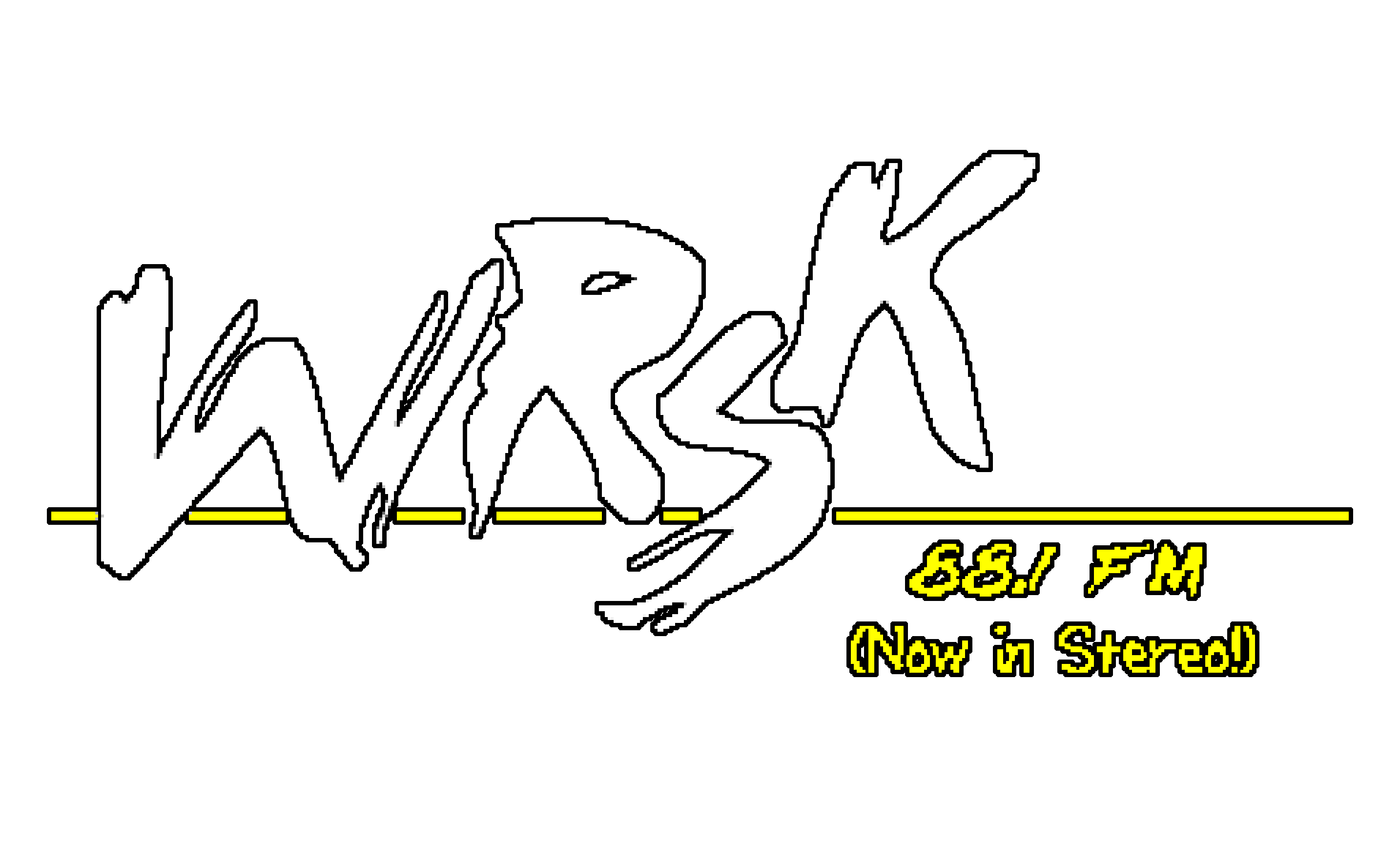
WRSK's logo, 2000. This logo was only officially used online.

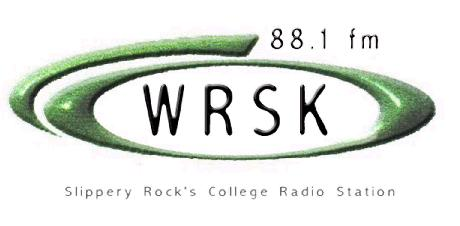
WRSK's logo, 2003

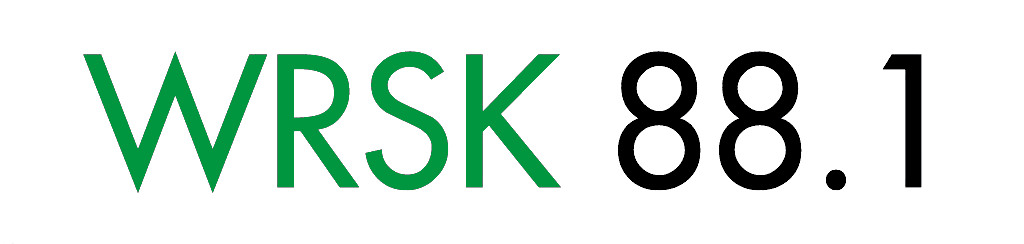
WRSK's final logo, 2005

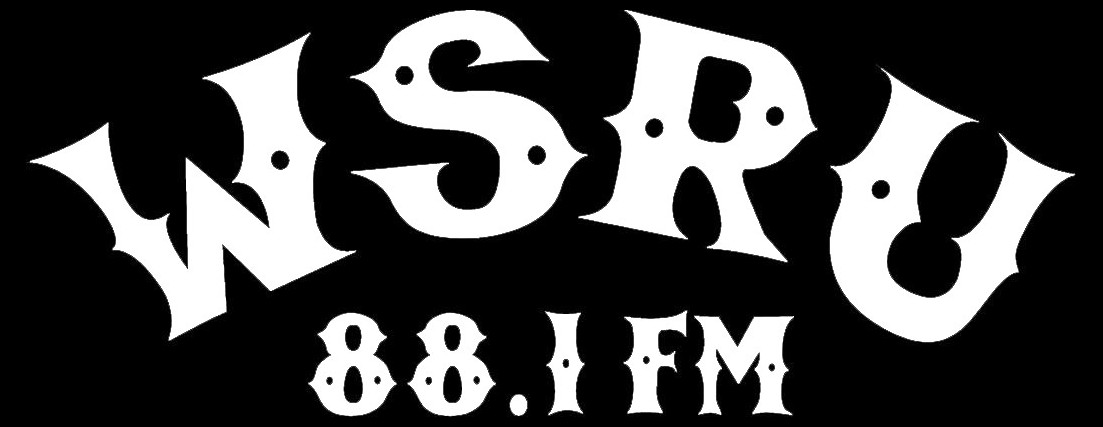
WSRU's first logo, 2006

WSRU is the college radio station of Slippery Rock University in Slippery Rock, Pennsylvania. It is owned by the Student Government Association. It is operated at a "rocking" 100 watts of power (according to the station's legal sign-off for DJs), serving SRU and the surrounding community. WSRU is run entirely by SRU students.

== History ==
=== News from Thirty-Eight: Closed Circuit Radio ===
In the first semester of 1960, a closed-circuit radio station operated on a nightly schedule in Patterson Hall with a power output of less than 1/10 of one watt. This station originated in room 38 of Patterson Hall and broadcast an hour of recorded music and campus news each evening to the three hundred men living in the dorm. The call letters chosen for the station came from the four initial letters of "News from Thirty-Eight." Hence, the call letters "NFTE" and its nickname "Nifty" were adopted. Near the end of the Fall 1960, the transmitting equipment was damaged, and Patterson Hall's radio station went off the air. Several attempts were made to repair the equipment, but the semester came to an end along with the enthusiasm for "NFTE".

=== WNFT, 1962 - 1980 ===
Slippery Rock State College became a member of the Intercollegiate Broadcasting System (I.B.S.) in 1961, and it remains a member of today. The college officially requests and is granted an FCC license for a 10-watt broadcast at 640 kHz with the callsign WNFT. WNFT operated on a shoestring budget before its launch, reporting a total balance of $110 with no transmission or sound equipment or records. The original transmitter and console were hand-built by engineering professors and students. In addition to equipment, they were also procuring records and tapping all free sources known. These sources included 10 to 30-minute spots of music from the armed services. In December 1961, WNFT staff sold "Tag Day" tickets for $0.25 each to students to continue to raise the funds needed.

After two years of cooperative student and faculty efforts, WNFT holds an open house in North Hall. Everyone was invited to view and to hear the new 600 kHz., 25-watt Slippery Rock radio station. The broadcast radius covered 3 dormitories. The first official broadcast was at 6:00 p.m., a tape of light classical music performed by the Mormon Tabernacle Choir. Despite successfully finding resources to launch, WNFT continues to operate on a shoestring budget and will do so for many years afterward.

Slippery Rock State College opened a new student union building known as the College Union (later renamed University Union) in 1970, and WNFT relocated to a custom-built studio in C-211, where it remained until 2021. University Union was replaced by the Robert M. Smith Student Center in 2013, leaving WSRU as one of the last occupants of University Union. By 1970, WNFT broadcast from 7 am to 2 am, 7 days a week, utilizing a top 40 rock format mixed with other common radio features (weather, local news, and public affairs programs). WNFT solicited advertisers to move away from their former shoestring budget.

WNFT launched the Slippery Rock Radio Network in 1971, broadcasting college sports (both at home and away) live to WNFT, as well as local Butler County and New Castle radio stations. This lasted until the early 1980s, although the station continues to broadcast home football & basketball games live to this day.

In 1974, WNFT's news department interviewed Democratic primary candidates Pete Flaherty and Herb Denenberg for Pennsylvania's US Senate election that year. Ironically, the Republican candidate and incumbent Senator in that election, Richard Schweiker, was a two-year attendee of Slippery Rock State College. Schweiker was not invited for an interview. Schweiker went on to win that election and became Secretary of Health and Human Services in 1981.

In 1980, WNFT became WRCK to better reflect the modern campus.

=== WRCK, 1980 - 1991 ===
In August 1981, the WRCK staff selected Gregory Beat, Coordinator of Residence Education and Student Activities, to serve as faculty advisor. He led the station based on his previous work and advisory experience with college radio facilities at WIUM, WVKC, and WRKC.

During Homecoming weekend 1983, the original version of WSRU went on the air as an educational station, broadcasting from the 2nd floor of the Eisenberg Classroom Building. The programming consists of "block programming," including Jazz, Classical and Orchestral music, Rock, Easy Listening/Soft Rock, Country and Christian themed selections. The Communication Department-run station runs concurrently with the existing WRCK until WSRU ceases operations in 1991. (The license for the original WSRU was later terminated by the FCC in 2006 and then repurchased by WRSK engineer Werner Ullrich, leading to their eventual rebranding.)

In 1990, Slippery Rock University installed and activated a campus-wide digital telephone system. This, in effect, eliminates the broadcast of WRCK-AM, as its carrier current AM transmission was dependent on the old analog telephone lines to the campus residence halls. This marks the end of AM broadcasting of any station on Slippery Rock's campus. As a result, WRCK applies for a new license to build a dedicated FM transmitter. The FCC grants the university a construction permit and the callsign WRSK, which becomes active effective November 30. Despite WSRU claiming WNFT as its roots and celebrating a 50th anniversary in 2012, this legally marks the official foundation of the modern campus radio station. Due to having no dedicated transmission equipment, WRCK was only heard in the lobby of the University Union from 1990 to 1991.

=== WRSK, 1991 - 2006 ===
WRSK's first day on-air was September 1, 1991. This ends the station's 30-year history of closed-circuit broadcasting (whether through carrier current AM or locally). The station launched at 8 am local time and played The Rolling Stones' Start Me Up to mark the milestone.

During the 1992 campaign cycle, California governor and former Democratic presidential candidate Jerry Brown calls and is interviewed by Richard Hart, host of WSRU's only talk radio program, "Straight to the Hart."

In 2003, DJ Paul Miller interviewed WWE Legend Mick "Mankind" Foley on the Low Blow Show. Foley then spoke at the university's Union about his time in the WWE.

After the license for the WSRU callsign (which had been owned by the university's communications department) expires in 2005, WRSK purchases the license and becomes WSRU-FM effective December 1, 2006.

=== WSRU ===
In 2012, WSRU celebrated its 50th Anniversary of radio at Slippery Rock University.

In 2013, a short-lived online feed of WSRU, was launched with Integrity 3.0 being the first show to broadcast in this format. However, online streaming would cease three months after launch due to new FCC regulations on the medium. Due to the relatively low range of the station's FM feed, launching a licensed online broadcast becomes a priority. On Feb. 28, 2022, WSRU 88.1 FM's Facebook page announced that you can listen online via http://wsrufm.com or by downloading their app.

Despite not having a formal news operation at the time, WSRU invited four candidates for Slippery Rock's congressional district to hold an interview on-air before the 2018 primary.

In October 2018, the Democratic nominee for Lieutenant Governor of Pennsylvania, John Fetterman, was interviewed by WSRU's news department. Fetterman would go on to win the election and be sworn in as lieutenant governor on January 15, 2019, and later be elected to the U.S. Senate in 2022.

In March 2020, as a consequence of the COVID-19 pandemic, the station cancelled all live programming and has operated automatically since. In July 2021, the station moved to a newly remodeled location in Strain Safety Building, gaining an additional dedicated studio area. The strain is directly adjacent to Patterson Hall, the original home of WNFT, though the building has since been remodeled from a residence hall to a classroom building.

In August 2021, WSRU launched a new logo to coincide with a post-pandemic organizational relaunch.

== Branding history ==
- 1960 (as NFTE): News from Thirty-Eight
- 1971 - 1981 (as WNFT): The Slippery Rock Radio Network
- 1980 - mid-1980s (as WRCK): Rock Radio
- mid-1980s - present (as WRCK, WRSK, and WSRU): The Voice of The Rock
- 1992 - 1994 (as WRSK): The Station that Rocks the Rock
- 1992 - 2006: Slippery Rock's Radio Alternative (written in on-campus advertising as The Radio Alternative)
- 1997 - 2003: World Domination. One Song at a Time.
- 2002 - 2004: Slippery Rock's College Radio Station
- 2004 - 2006, revived for a station ID in 2018: Turn Us On. We'll Return the Favor.

== Notable alumni ==
- Michael T. Muha - Class of 2006. Elected commissioner of Hermitage, Pennsylvania in 2017.
- Ryan D. McGregor - Class of 2009. Elected Borough Councilman of North East, Pennsylvania in 2021.
- Alex Stoyanoff - Class of 2013, Co-Host of Integrity 3.0 on WSRU. Former producer for WBGG AM Pittsburgh 970 ESPN (In The Locker Room With Tunch and Wolf, Savran On Sports, Savran/Benz), Producer/Former Call Screener for WXDX FM Pittsburgh 105.9 The X (Pen's Week, The Mark Madden Show). Appears in various commercials.
- James Garrity - Spring Class of 2014, Co-Host of The Sunday Sauce on WSRU. Current News Anchor for News Radio 1020 KDKA.
