= President's Commission on Campus Unrest =

1970 American Vietnam War-era commission

Scranton Commission
- President's Commission on Campus unrest

History
- Established by: Richard Nixon on 13 June 1970

Membership
- Chairperson: William Scranton
- Other committee members: James F. Ahern Erwin D. Canham; James E. Cheek; Lt Gen Benjamin O. Davis Jr. Martha A. Derthick; Bayless Manning; Revius O. Ortique Jr. Joseph Rhodes Jr.

Jurisdiction
- Purpose: Study the ongoing unrest and dissent on college and university campuses, particularly the national student strike

Summary
- That the shootings of four students at Kent State by members of the Ohio Army National Guard were "unjustified"

On June 13, 1970, President Richard Nixon established the President's Commission on Campus unrest, which became known as the Scranton Commission after its chairman, former Pennsylvania governor William Scranton.

Scranton was asked to study the dissent, disorder, and violence breaking out on college and university campuses, particularly the national student strike that was then going on. The student strike was both a general protest against the Vietnam War and a specific response to the American invasion of Cambodia and the killings of four students at Kent State University in Ohio. Other violent confrontations, such as the killing of two students at Jackson State College in Mississippi, also incited public and administration concern.

Scranton concluded that, "It is true that the amount of campus disruption and violence certainly was much less in the period when the war seemed to be going in the direction of terminating and people were beginning to come back to the United States, for example, late last fall, this last winter, and early spring. And certainly it got much stronger after the Cambodia. We all know that, after the Cambodian invasion. So the less extenuation there is of American participation and the more return of men, the more helpful it is, of course."

The Commission issued its findings in a September 1970 report. It concluded that the shootings at Kent State were unjustified. The report said: Even if the guardsmen faced danger, it was not a danger that called for lethal force. The 61 shots by 28 guardsmen certainly cannot be justified. Apparently, no order to fire was given, and there was inadequate fire control discipline on Blanket Hill. The Kent State tragedy must mark the last time that, as a matter of course, loaded rifles are issued to guardsmen confronting student demonstrators.

== Members ==
The members of the commission were:

- William W. Scranton, former governor of Pennsylvania (chairman)
- James F. Ahern, chief of police, New Haven, Connecticut
- Erwin D. Canham, editor-in-chief, Christian Science Monitor
- James E. Cheek, president, Howard University
- Lieutenant General Benjamin O. Davis Jr., United States Air Force (retired), Director, Civil Aviation Security, United States Department of Transportation
- Martha A. Derthick, Emerita Professor, University of Virginia
- Bayless Manning, dean, Stanford Law School
- Revius O. Ortique Jr., attorney-at-law, New Orleans, Louisiana
- Joseph Rhodes Jr., junior fellow, Harvard University

== See also ==
- Opposition to the Vietnam War
