= Joseph Rhodes Jr. =

American politician (1947–2013)

Member of the Pennsylvania House of Representatives from the 24th district
- In office January 2, 1973 – November 19, 1980
- Preceded by: Erroll B. Davis
- Succeeded by: William W. Pendleton

Personal details
- Born: August 14, 1947 Pittsburgh, Pennsylvania
- Died: November 7, 2013 (aged 66) Susquehanna Township, Dauphin County, Pennsylvania
- Party: Democratic
- Spouse: Linda Rhodes (divorced)
- Education: California Institute of Technology; Harvard University

Joseph Rhodes Jr. (August 14, 1947 – November 7, 2013) was an American politician and activist. From 1972–1980, he served four 2-year terms as a member of the Pennsylvania House of Representatives. He was a commissioner of the Pennsylvania Public Utility Commission from 1988–1995. He served as a member of several public panels, including the President's Commission on Campus Unrest that investigated the fatal shootings of unarmed student protesters by soldiers and police in 1970 at Kent State and Jackson State Universities.

== Early life and career ==
Rhodes' father was an African-American who served as a US soldier in the Philippines during World War II. Rhodes' mother, a woman of Filipino/Chinese descent, met his father there in 1945 and married him. The couple settled in Pittsburgh. Rhodes attended Pittsburgh public schools.

From 1965-1969 Rhodes was an undergraduate at the California Institute of Technology, and he received a B.S. in history in 1969. Rhodes served two terms as the president of the Associated Students of the California Institute of Technology, the undergraduate student government. He was in residence at Harvard University from 1969–1972 as a junior fellow of the Harvard Society of Fellows, where he researched racism in Victorian England. He was the first Black person admitted to the Society. Rhodes then held a number of teaching positions at the University of Massachusetts, California State College and the University of Pittsburgh. He was also employed at the Jet Propulsion Laboratory in 1967, and served as a staff researcher for the Ford Foundation 1969-1970.

== Policy work ==
After 1968 Rhodes served on a number of national commissions studying such diverse subjects as the causes of campus unrest and the need for new structures in higher education. He was a consultant to the Office of the Secretary, Department of Health, Education, and Welfare, 1968–1971. He was a member of the More Effective School Personnel Utilization (MESPU) Panel in the Office of Education from 1969-1970, and a consultant to the President Nixon's Counsel from 1969–1970. He was a member of President Nixon's Committee on Voluntary Service, 1969. He also served on the Department of Health, Education, and Welfare Secretary's Committee on New Structures in Higher Education (The Newman Committee) (1969–1972), and he was on the Advisory Panel of the National Endowment for the Humanities, 1971.

Rhodes' service on the President's Commission on Campus Unrest in 1970 brought him to nationwide attention. This Commission was established specifically to investigate two incidents in 1970 in which unarmed student protesters were shot and killed by soldiers and policemen, one at Kent State University in Ohio and a second at Jackson State University in Mississippi. Rhodes was the youngest and least known member of the committee, and its only current student; his selection for the commission is attributed to his longstanding relationship with John Ehrlichman, who was a prominent member of then President Richard Nixon's staff. Shortly after his appointment, Rhodes gave a controversial interview to Robert Reinhold of The New York Times in which he said "If the President's and Vice-President's statements are killing people, I want to know that" and that California Governor Ronald Reagan was "bent on killing people for his political gain." The following day, Vice-President Spiro Agnew called publicly for Rhodes to resign. Rhodes refused, and was a signatory to the Commission's "Scranton Report" in September, 1970.

== Political career ==
Rhodes was elected to the Pennsylvania House of Representatives, 24th Legislative District (Allegheny County), in 1972, and was reelected to the House for three successive terms. In 1977 he sponsored an amendment (Act 41) to the Juvenile Justice Act that prohibited incarceration of juveniles in adult jails and that diverted status offenders from the juvenile justice system. Status offenders are those whose crimes derive from the offender's juvenile status instead of from the criminal act itself; one example would be violation of a juvenile curfew that bans juveniles from public places during certain hours of the night. Linda Rhodes has been quoted as saying that Rhodes "...considered passage of Act 41 as his greatest achievement during his three-terms as a lawmaker."

Rhodes did not run for a fifth term as a Representative. He sought the Democratic party nomination for United States Senate in 1980, but lost substantially in the April, 1980 primary election to former Pittsburgh mayor Peter F. Flaherty. Arlen Specter defeated Flaherty in the November, 1980 general election.

== Later career ==
Rhodes then worked as a planner for the Westinghouse Corporation in Pittsburgh for seven years. In 1987 he was appointed by Pennsylvania Governor Robert P. Casey as the Deputy Commissioner of Commerce. In 1988 he was confirmed by the Pennsylvania Senate as a commissioner of the Pennsylvania Public Utility Commission, and served until 1995. He then worked as a consultant for corporations and for the leadership of the Pennsylvania House of Representatives.

He was cited by Time Magazine as one of 200 new leaders in America and received the Americans for Democratic Action National Youth Award in 1971. He was named on the master list of Nixon political opponents during his service to the Nixon administration, and included this as an award on his resume.

== Personal life ==
Rhodes had been married to Linda Rhodes, who served from 1987–1994 as the Pennsylvania Commonwealth's Secretary of Aging. The couple had two children.
