= Brenda Frazier (politician) =

American politician and activist

Member of the Allegheny County Council from the 13th District
- In office 2001 – February 11, 2008
- Preceded by: Tom Foerster
- Succeeded by: Amanda Green

Personal details
- Born: 1941 (age 84–85) Shelby, North Carolina
- Party: Democratic
- Spouse: Andrew Frazier (m. 1969; died 2014)
- Children: 3
- Education: Indiana University of Pennsylvania

Brenda L. Strong Frazier (born 1941) is an American politician and activist. Born in Shelby, North Carolina, Frazier and her family moved to Allegheny County, Pennsylvania, in 1943. She received a bachelor's degree in elementary education at Indiana University of Pennsylvania and began working as an elementary school teacher in Pittsburgh. She joined the First Pittsburgh chapter of the National Organization for Women (NOW) in 1975 and helped to found the East End chapter of the organization, which required the election of two presidents: one white and one Black. She served as chair of NOW's national minority women's committee.

Frazier was elected to the Allegheny County Council for District 13 in 2001 as a Democrat. She founded and chaired the Allegheny County Black Elected Officials organization. She was re-elected in 2004 and 2008, although she resigned her position on February 11, 2008, to run for a seat in the Pennsylvania House of Representatives. She lost the Democratic primary to Dom Costa. Following the unsuccessful election, she joined the Pennsylvania Democratic Committee and founded the organization's Black caucus.

== Early life ==
Frazier was born in 1941 in Shelby, North Carolina. Her father worked during World War II in steel mills before taking a job with a railroad company and opening a dry cleaning business. Her mother was a teacher who often had a difficult time finding work as a result of her gender and race. She was the eldest of eight children and her family moved to Whitaker, Pennsylvania, in 1943 where they lived in segregated public housing. The family also lived in West Mifflin, Braddock, and Homestead. Frazier attended Homestead High School and Braddock High School. She graduated with a bachelor's degree in elementary education from the Indiana University of Pennsylvania. Inspired by her aunt who led her local chapter of the NAACP in New Jersey, Frazier became involved in civil rights activism while at university, attending sit-ins at restaurants that were racially segregated and participating in the March on Washington in 1963.

She began working in 1964 as an elementary school teacher in Pittsburgh, where she joined the teachers' union. She received further diplomas in special needs education and completed some graduate studies at the University of Pittsburgh and Carlow University. She married fellow teacher Andrew Frazier in 1969, when she stopped teaching to raise the couple's three children: Andrew Jr., Evan, and Janine. She had received her certification in real estate from the Community College of Allegheny County and while her children were small, she sold property and insurance. The family was part of the racial integration of a neighborhood in Pittsburgh, moving to a white neighborhood so their children could attend better schools. Frazier frequently brought her children to meetings and rallies with activists in Washington, D.C. She returned to teaching between 1988 and 1997, when her children were older.

== Activism ==
In 1975, Frazier was recruited by a neighbor to join the First Pittsburgh chapter of the National Organization for Women (NOW). However, she was determined to continue to focus on combating racism, even after joining NOW. The local chapter of the organization was not focused on racial justice at the time Frazier joined, as it was still predominately made up of members who were white and middle class and focusing on the Equal Rights Amendment (ERA). She said in 2009 that "[she] didn't want to stop fighting racism to fight against sexism". However, in the late 1970s, there began to be more of a focus on racism and sexism within NOW. Frazier was inspired by the organization's 1978 national conference, but continued to challenge white feminists and African American leaders; she urged Jesse Jackson to consider the importance of the women's movement.

She was a member of the East Hills chapter of NOW but along with five other members, including Carol Titus, Frazier worked to found the East End chapter which had by-laws that required the election of two presidents, one white and one African American. The chapter organized a conference focusing on racism and sexism in Pittsburgh and campaigned for the national board of NOW to pass a resolution that would ensure that African American women were represented on the board.

Frazier was appointed as one of the chairs of the National NOW Task Force on Minority Women in the late 1970s, alongside Jackie Washington and Val Cafee, and she organized a national task force on Black feminism. She served on the board of the Pennsylvania branch and national organization. As chair of the state anti-racism committee, she worked with LaVera Brown to form the committee to Counter the Klan (later renamed the committee to Counter Hate Groups) in response to an upswing in local activity of the Ku Klux Klan. They organized counter protests and a network of neighbors to provide support to those who were targeted by the Klan.

She was a board member of the Pittsburgh Partnership for Neighborhood Development and vice president of the North Side Community Leadership Fund. She was a president of the Stanton Heights Civic Association and a member of the Young Women's Christian Association (YWCA) Women's Advisory Commission. She helped to found the parent-teacher association at Peabody High School. Frazier was a delegate for Pennsylvania, representing the 14th congressional district at the 1980 Democratic National Convention and the 2004 Democratic National Convention. She endorsed Democrat John Kerry in the 2004 presidential election. She is also a supporter of LGBT rights and the ERA.

== Political career ==
Frazier was elected to the Allegheny County Council for District 13 in 2001, taking over the two year remainder of Tom Foerster's term in office following his death. She ran as a Democrat but lost out on the party's endorsement to Robert Biel, which the Pittsburgh Post-Gazette reported was likely due to her connections with Republican Jim Roddey, who was serving as the county's chief executive. Frazier had been appointed by Roddey to his transition team. She received 4,735 votes in the Democratic primary on May 15, 2001, beating Biel with 3,955 votes, Richard Stahl with 3,058 votes, Vernon L. Boozer with 828 votes, and Daniel Styche with 453 votes. She was unopposed in the general election on November 6. She was the first Black woman elected to the county council following its establishment as a home-rule government the year prior and one of three members of the fifteen-person council who was not a white man. Frazier served as chair of the organization that she founded, the Allegheny County Black Elected Officials. She chaired the health and human services committee of the county council and was a member of the appointment review, budget and finance, economic development, government relations, and campaign reforms committees.

Frazier won re-election in 2004, running against Stahl for the second time. In both elections, she was not endorsed by a political party but won the Democratic primary and the general election. She also received the endorsement of the Pittsburgh-Post Gazette in both elections. In 2007, she was the co-sponsor of a rule change to add term limits for volunteers serving on county boards. The same year, she ran for re-election against Matthew Arena, who won the endorsement of the Democratic Party. He challenged Frazier's nominating petition in the court of common pleas, a case which was unsuccessful but which he appealed to the Commonwealth Court. She won the primary in May and was unopposed in the general election in November.

Frazier resigned from the County Council on February 11, 2008, to run for a seat in the Pennsylvania House of Representatives. Her position on the council was filled by Amanda Green. She contested the 21st district in the seat vacated by Lisa Bennington. She ran in the Democratic primary on April 22, 2008, against Len Bodack and Dom Costa, but finished third with 4,595 votes to Costa's 4,940 votes and Bodack's 4,703 votes. She was opposed by HosPAC, a political group consisting of members of the hospitality industry, who campaigned against Frazier as a result of her vote in favor of a 10 percent tax on poured drinks in Allegheny County.

== Later life ==
Frazier served on the Pennsylvania Democratic Committee and was the founder of a Black caucus within the organization. Her husband died on December 22, 2014. The formation of the East End chapter of NOW and the committee to Counter the Klan were honored in an exhibit entitled 'Strength in the Struggle: Civil Rights' at the August Wilson Center, which included photographs of the chapter's founders. Frazier was interviewed in 2009 for In Sisterhood: The Women's Movement in Pittsburgh, a multimedia project on local feminists in the 1970s and 1980s run by Patricia Ulbrich. She was honored on February 28, 2015, at a Black History Month dinner hosted by Classic Events, a public relations firm in Wilkinsburg, Pennsylvania.
