= Herb Denenberg =

American journalist

Herbert S. Denenberg (November 20, 1929 – March 18, 2010) was an American television journalist, lawyer, consumer advocate, and insurance regulator. He is best remembered by audiences in the Philadelphia television market as a long time consumer affairs reporter on WCAU (Channel 10).

== Biography ==
Born into a Jewish family in Omaha, Nebraska, the son of a Russian-born father and a Romanian-born mother, Denenberg's father died of a heart attack when he was twelve, leaving him to help raise his seven siblings. He had an extensive educations, earning his B.S. at Johns Hopkins University, J.D. at Creighton University School of Law, LL.M. at Harvard Law School, and Ph.D. at the University of Pennsylvania. He was both a Chartered Property Casualty Underwriter and a Chartered Life Underwriter. He served three years in the Judge Advocate General's Corps, United States Army as a first lieutenant and as a captain in the reserve.

In his academic career, Denenberg was an assistant professor of insurance at the University of Iowa, professor of law at Temple University, adjunct professor at Cabrini College, and Loman Professor at the Wharton School of the University of Pennsylvania. He sat on the board of the Consumers Union, publishers of Consumer Reports, and was a consultant and counsel to numerous agencies of the federal government as well as state and local governments. He co-authored the first no-fault insurance law in the United States, passed in Puerto Rico, and was involved in revising insurance laws in Nevada and Alaska. In 1971, he was appointed Commissioner of the Pennsylvania Department of Insurance in the cabinet of Governor Milton Shapp. In 1974, he ran for the Democratic Party nomination for United States Senate, but lost to Mayor of Pittsburgh Peter Flaherty by less than four points; Flaherty, in turn, lost to incumbent Republican Richard Schweiker. The next year, Denenberg was appointed to the Pennsylvania Public Utilities Commission, but left government soon afterwards.

Soon afterwards, Denenberg began what would be a 24-year long career as a consumer and investigative reporter at Philadelphia's WCAU Channel 10 News. One of his segments was called "Denenberg's Dump" in which he would review products he deemed to be unsafe. He also exposed unsanitary practices by street vendors selling pretzels and hot dogs. During his career, through its time as both a CBS and NBC affiliate, he won 21 Emmy Awards. Aside from television, Denenberg also was a columnist for The Bulletin.

Denenberg died after suffering a heart attack at his home in Wayne, Pennsylvania on March 18, 2010. He was survived by his wife, Naomi. The same year, the Broadcast Pioneers of Philadelphia posthumously inducted Denenberg into their Hall of Fame.
