= Michelle Madoff =

Canadian-born American legislator

Member of the Pittsburgh City Council from the 2nd District^{[a]}
- In office May 30, 1978 – January 3, 1994
- Preceded by: Richard Caliguiri
- Succeeded by: Alan Hertzberg

Personal details
- Born: Pauline Radzinzki; August 2, 1928 Toronto, Ontario, Canada
- Died: October 12, 2013 (aged 85) Peoria, Arizona, U.S.
- Party: Democratic
- a.Madoff was originally elected to Caliguiri's at-large seat, but won re-election after a voter-approved referendum divided City Council seats into districts.

Michelle Madoff (/ˈmædɒf/; August 2, 1928 – October 12, 2013) was a Canadian-born American municipal politician who served on the Pittsburgh City Council from 1978 to 1994.

== Early life and education ==
Born as Pauline Radzinski in Toronto, Ontario, Canada, she attended Central Commerce High School and Brown's Business College. Because her birth name was difficult for teachers to pronounce, she legally changed it to Micki Rodin. She moved to the United States in 1952, where she married Dr. Henry R. Madoff in 1958. She settled in the Squirrel Hill neighborhood of Pittsburgh in 1961. She was Jewish.

== Early career ==
Before entering politics Madoff was a community and environmental activist. The polluted air of Pittsburgh adversely affected her asthma, inspiring her to start Group Against Smog and Pollution (GASP) in 1969. Madoff co-founded and was the first president of the Pittsburgh-based organization, a local group with a long history of environmental activism. Madoff worked with Jones and Laughlin Steel Company to keep steel-working jobs in Pittsburgh. She was unsuccessful in runs for Pittsburgh City Council in 1973 and Allegheny County Commissioner in 1975.

== Pittsburgh city council ==
Madoff was first elected in 1978 to fill the unexpired term of Richard Caliguiri. Caliguiri was serving as President of Pittsburgh City Council and became mayor when Peter Flaherty was appointed Deputy Attorney General of the United States in the Jimmy Carter Presidential Administration. When the Pittsburgh City Council switched from one being elected at-large to a by-district format in 1989, she was the first person elected to represent Council District 2, winning 26.5% of the vote.

In October 1979 she picketed in front of Mayor Caliguri's office every day for greater minority representation in city government.

She famously led a years long fight to have the one restroom that was available to City Council at the Pittsburgh City Hall redesigned to be used in a uni-sex fashion, hosting a "toilet party" for her supporters in April 1980 to celebrate her success. Future mayor Sophie Masloff, the only other female on council at the time, did not attend, and later commented to the press: "What the hell do I care about her toilet? I got more important things to do."

Madoff and sometimes council president Eugene "Jeep" DePasquale were regular rivals on council through the 1980s. In 1983, DePasquale's dismissal of a tax she proposed when he joked at a council meeting that he would "kiss [her] you-know-what" if it ever raised just $20. After the tax raised $1,542.15 ($5,144.9 today) in a short time, she challenged DePasquale to make good on his promise by waiting for him under the Kaufmann's Clock with a dozen reporters and 100 on-lookers on January 24, 1983. DePasquale, however, was a no-show, later telling reporters that "I thought it would be undignified".

In 1984 she loudly excoriated councilman Steve Grabowski after he was the lone vote against a law increasing parking garage safety in the city, by exclaiming "Shame on you!"

During the March, 1986 council vote to have the city sell bonds worth $21 million to save the Pittsburgh Pirates, Madoff claimed she was "threatened with impeachment".

In a 1991 run for city controller, Madoff finished third, with 28.3% of votes. Madoff lost her council seat after being defeated in the 1993 Democratic primary.

== Retirement ==
Madoff later lived in South Carolina and Las Vegas. She married Fred Scheske in 2001 and settled in Arizona. They had originally met on the online dating service Match.com. She died at a retirement community in Peoria, Arizona on October 12, 2013, aged 85, from leukemia.
