= 1977 Pittsburgh mayoral election =

- November 1, 1977
Nominee	Richard Caliguiri	Tom Foerster	Joe Cosetti
Party	Independent	Democratic	Republican
Popular vote	68,902	62,860	12,205
Percentage	47.9%	43.7%	8.5%
Mayor before election
Richard Caliguiri
Independent
Elected Mayor
Richard Caliguiri
Independent

The Mayoral election of 1977 in Pittsburgh, Pennsylvania, was held on Tuesday, November 1, 1977. The incumbent mayor, Richard Caliguiri, had taken office 10 months earlier, after longtime mayor Pete Flaherty resigned to take a position in the newly formed Jimmy Carter presidential administration. A former City Council President, he renounced his Democratic Party membership for the election and run for his first full term as an independent.

== Primary elections ==
Allegheny County Commissioner Tom Foerster, a powerful party leader, won the Democratic Primary. He was victorious in a contentious battle over city Controller Frank Luccino and fellow city Councilman Jim Sims.

== General election ==
Caliguiri had originally planned not to seek reelection, but a personal clash with Foerster over environmental issues and mass transit funding led to Caliguiri reentering the race; because the filing deadline for the primary had already passed, the Democrat was forced to run as an independent. With Republican attorney Joe Cosetti a nonfactor in the heavily Democratic city, Caliguiri emerged victorious in a highly contested race between two fixtures of area politics. A total of 143,967 votes were cast.

Pittsburgh mayoral election, 1977
Party	Candidate	Votes	%	±%
Independent	Richard Caliguiri (incumbent)	68,902	47.9	
Democratic	Tom Foerster	62,860	43.7	
Republican	Joe Cosetti	12,205	8.5	
Turnout		143,967		

Preceded by 1973	Pittsburgh mayoral election 1977	Succeeded by 1981
