= 1973 Pittsburgh mayoral election =

- November 6, 1973
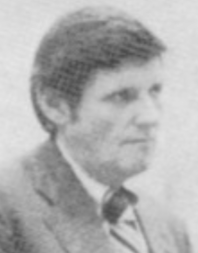
Nominee	Pete Flaherty
Party	Democratic/Republican
Popular vote	67,550
Percentage	100.0%
Mayor before election
Pete Flaherty
Democratic
Elected Mayor
Pete Flaherty
Democratic

The Mayoral election of 1973 in Pittsburgh, Pennsylvania was held on Tuesday, November 6, 1973. The incumbent mayor, Pete Flaherty of the Democratic Party chose to run for his second full term.

== Primary Election ==
City Councilman Richard Caliguiri, a rising star in city politics (and future mayor) filed to run against Flaherty in the primary. Because Flaherty had long antagonized the remnants of the city's archaic Democratic machine, the aging party bosses endorsed Caliguiri, even though both Democratic candidates had similar legacies as a reformer. However, the popular mayor earned a moderate victory despite tepid support from insiders.

== General Election ==
No Republicans filed to run in the primary; however, Flaherty won, by write-in, the Republican primary. The popular mayor received nearly 80% of his vote total on the Democratic line, which is in line with party registration in the city. A total of 67,550 votes were cast.

Pittsburgh mayoral election, 1973
Party	Candidate	Votes	%	±%
Democratic	Pete Flaherty (incumbent)	52,471	77.7	
Republican	Pete Flaherty (incumbent)	15,079	22.3	
Total	Pete Flaherty (incumbent)	67,550	100.00	
Turnout		67,550		
Democratic hold		Swing		

Preceded by 1969	Pittsburgh mayoral election 1973	Succeeded by 1977
