= Tom Foerster =

American politician (1927–2000)

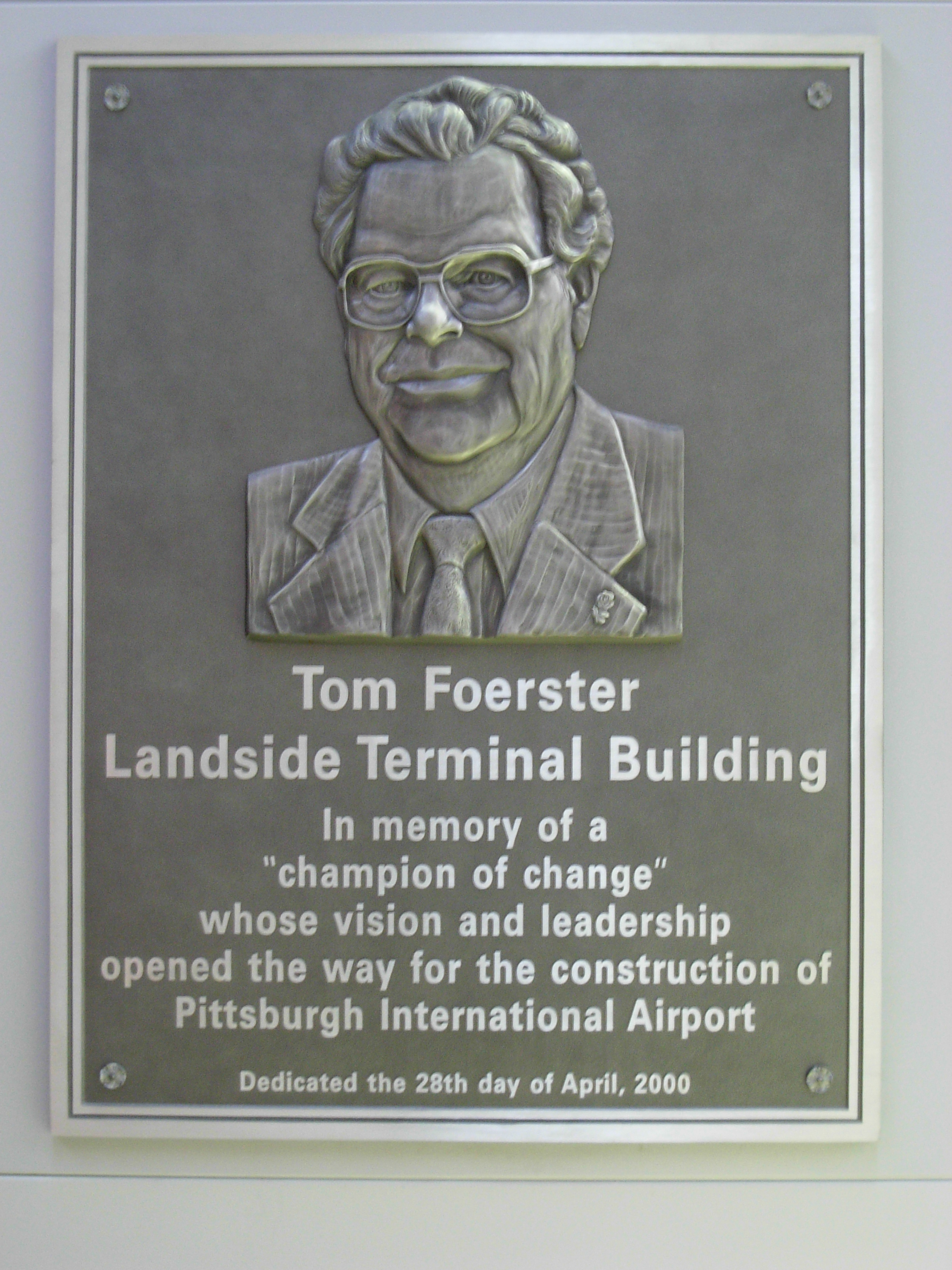

Member of the Allegheny County Council from the 13th District
- In office January 3, 2000 – January 11, 2000
- Preceded by: Board Created
- Succeeded by: Brenda Frazier

Member of the Allegheny County Board of Commissioners
- In office January 1, 1968 – January 1, 1996
- Preceded by: John McGrady
- Succeeded by: Bob Cranmer

Member of the Pennsylvania House of Representatives from the Allegheny County district
- In office January 6, 1959 – November 8, 1967

Personal details
- Born: April 17, 1927 Pittsburgh, Pennsylvania
- Died: January 11, 2000 (aged 72) Pittsburgh, Pennsylvania
- Party: Democratic
- Spouse: Georgeann Zupancic (19??-2000; his death)
- Children: 5 (stepchildren)
- Education: Slippery Rock College

Thomas J. Foerster (April 17, 1927 – January 11, 2000) was an American Democratic politician. Foerster held a variety of political positions in Allegheny County, Pennsylvania, and began his career as part of the political "machine" of David Lawrence.

== Career ==
A native of Pittsburgh, Foerster was active in athletics while a high school student, and while attending Slippery Rock College (now a university). He also began coaching youth football.

=== State House ===
Foerster unsuccessfully sought a seat in the Pennsylvania State House in both 1954 and 1956. He was successful in his third bid in 1958, winning one of Allegheny County's allotted at-large seats by defeating former Steelers quarterback John "Harp" Vaughn.

Foerster joined Leroy Irvis (who would go on to serve as the first African American Speaker of the State House) and State Senator Eugene Scanlon in a much-heralded freshman legislative class. While in the State House, he championed the cause of outdoorsmen and environmentalists, distinguishing himself by authoring Pennsylvania's Clean Streams Law.

=== Board of Commissioners ===
Foerster was persuaded to run for one of the three seats on Allegheny County's Board of Commissioners in 1967. He received significant backing from the political machine of former Pittsburgh Mayor David Lawrence, whom Foerster had long admired. Lawrence, who had been elected Governor the same year Foerster won his State House seat, supported Forester and his running mate, former State Senator Leonard Staisey. Together, Staisey and Foerster toppled incumbent Democratic Commissioners William McClelland and John McGrady in the primary election. Foerster would go on to be re-elected to the Board of Commissioners a record six more times.

In 1977, he was the Democratic nominee for Pittsburgh Mayor. However, he lost the general election to incumbent Mayor Richard Caliguiri, who ran as an independent.

As chairman, he initiated a plan to establish home rule in Allegheny County, which would replace the county commission with an elected County Executive and a County Council. This initiative was based upon a study set into motion by him and county commissioner Pete Flaherty in 1995. They established a committee chaired by the then Chancellor of Duquesne University, John E. Murray, Jr. called "ComPAC 21", (The committee to Prepare Allegheny County for the 21st Century). Their report laid the plan for a completely new organizational structure of county government.

The new form of government recommended by the study was advanced by the subsequent board, voted upon via a county-wide referendum, and officially instituted in 2000, and he became the first person to represent the 13th district on the council, which replaced the County Board of Commissioners.

He was defeated in the Democratic primary in his bid for an eighth term in 1995. That fall, Republicans Bob Cranmer and Larry Dunn both won seats on the Board, forming the first Republican majority in six decades.

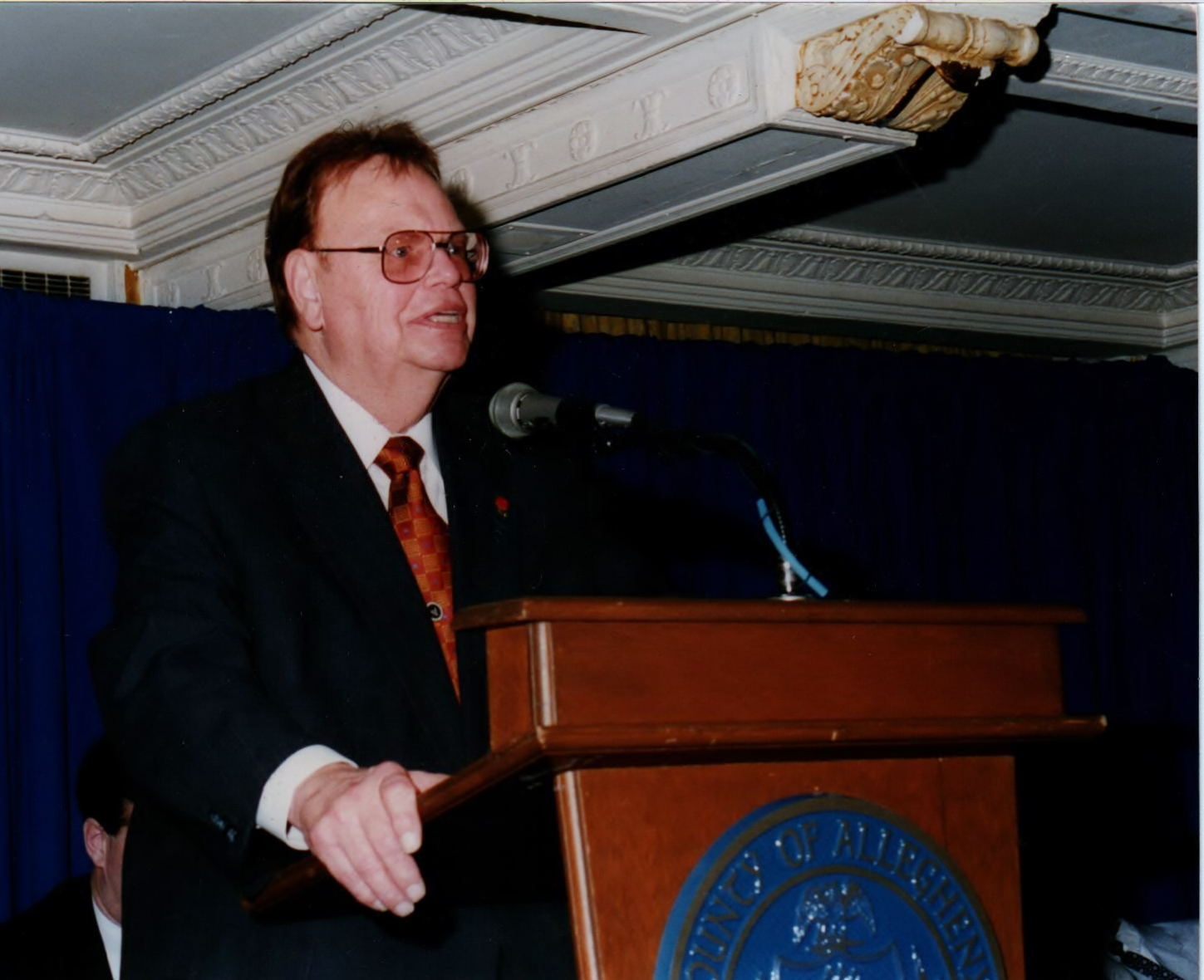
Commissioner Foerster in 1996

=== County Council ===
In 1999, Foerster was elected to the Allegheny County Council, which was created by the enactment of Allegheny County's home rule charter in 1998. He became the first person to represent the 13th district on the council, which replaced the County Board of Commissioners.

== Death ==
Foerster died on January 11, 2000, just eleven days into his term, from complications of cardiac arrest and diabetes. He was 72 years old and had been in a coma for nearly a week. He was survived by his wife, Georgeann, and five stepchildren.
