= 1980 United States Senate election in Pennsylvania =

- November 4, 1980
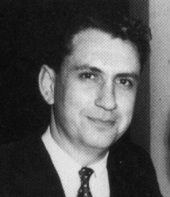

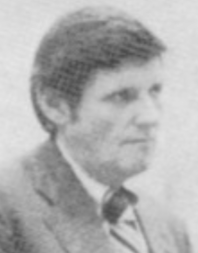
Nominee	Arlen Specter	Peter Flaherty
Party	Republican	Democratic
Popular vote	2,230,404	2,122,391
Percentage	50.48%	48.04%
- County results Specter: 50–60% 60–70% 70–80% Flaherty: 40–50% 50–60% 60–70% 70–80%
U.S. senator before election
Richard Schweiker
Republican
Elected U.S. Senator
Arlen Specter
Republican

The 1980 United States Senate election in Pennsylvania was held on November 4, 1980. Incumbent Republican U.S. Senator Richard Schweiker decided to retire, instead of seeking a third term.

Republican nominee Arlen Specter won the open seat, defeating Democratic nominee Peter F. Flaherty.

As of 2026, this 1980 election was the last time Philadelphia voted for a Republican statewide candidate. This is also the last Senate election in which Butler County, Clarion County, Venango County, and Jefferson County voted Democratic.

== Republican primary ==
=== Candidates ===
- Norman W. Bertasavage, candidate for U.S. House in 1976 from Pottsville
- Bud Haabestad, Delaware County Councilman
- Edward L. Howard, State Senator from Doylestown
- Arlen Specter, former District Attorney of Philadelphia and candidate for Senate in 1976 and Governor in 1978
- Andrew J. Watson, perennial candidate and chair of the Pennsylvania Constitutional Party
- Warren R. Williams
- Lewis C. Richards
- Francis Worley, former State Representative from Adams County and candidate for U.S. Senate in 1976 and Lt. Governor in 1978

=== Campaign ===
Arlen Specter, formerly a member of the Democratic Party, had served as legal counsel to the Warren Commission, which investigated the 1963 assassination of President John F. Kennedy, after which he became District Attorney of Philadelphia.

After Specter was defeated in a 1967 run for Mayor of Philadelphia, he was then also defeated in his bid for a third term as district attorney. He then ran in the Republican primary in the 1976 Senate election, but was defeated by John Heinz and also ran in the 1978 gubernatorial election, but was defeated by Dick Thornburgh in the primary.

Shortly after Specter opened a law practice in Atlantic City, New Jersey, incumbent Republican U.S. Senator Richard Schweiker unexpectedly announced his decision not to seek re-election to his seat. Specter, believing his reputation as a political moderate would help him in the general election, decided to run.

During the Republican primary, Specter faced state senator Edward Howard, as well as Delaware County councilman Bud Haabestad, who was endorsed by Schweiker, then-governor Thornburgh and John Heinz.

=== Results ===
Specter ultimately defeated Haabestad, his most prominent challenger, by approximately 37,000 votes.

Republican primary results
Party	Candidate	Votes	%
Republican	Arlen Specter	419,372	36.40
Republican	Bud Haabestad	382,281	33.18
Republican	Edward L. Howard	148,200	12.86
Republican	Norman W. Bertasavage	52,408	4.55
Republican	Andrew J. Watson	43,992	3.82
Republican	Warren R. Williams	38,153	3.31
Republican	Lewis C. Richards	36,982	3.21
Republican	Francis Worley	30,660	2.66

== Democratic primary ==
=== Candidates ===
- Pete Flaherty, former Mayor of Pittsburgh
- H. Craig Lewis, State Senator from Feasterville-Trevose
- Peter J. Liacouras, Dean of Temple University Law School
- Edward Mezvinsky, former U.S. Representative from Penn Valley
- Joseph Rhodes Jr., State Representative from Pittsburgh
- C. Delores Tucker, former Pennsylvania Secretary of State
- John J. Logue, former Democratic candidate for PA-07
- Tom Anderson

=== Campaign ===
During the Democratic primary, former Pittsburgh mayor Peter Flaherty contended with State Representative Joseph Rhodes, Jr., former U.S. Representative Edward Mezvinsky, State Senator H. Craig Lewis and Dean of Temple University Law School Peter J. Liacouras.

=== Results ===
Flaherty's name recognition enabled him to defeat his primary opponents, winning every county and thus winning the Democratic nomination.

Democratic primary results
Party	Candidate	Votes	%
Democratic	Pete Flaherty	771,119	53.23
Democratic	Joseph Rhodes Jr.	179,107	12.36
Democratic	Peter J. Liacouras	116,975	8.08
Democratic	C. Delores Tucker	107,483	7.42
Democratic	Edward Mezvinsky	100,841	6.96
Democratic	Tom Anderson	89,656	6.19
Democratic	H. Craig Lewis	69,701	4.81
Democratic	John J. Logue	13,752	0.95

== General election ==
=== Candidates ===
- Lee Frissell (Consumer)
- Peter F. Flaherty, former Mayor of Pittsburgh (Democratic)
- Frank Kinces (Communist)
- Linda Mohrbacher (Socialist Workers)
- Arlen Specter, former District Attorney of Philadelphia (Republican)
- David K. Walter (Libertarian)

=== Campaign ===
Flaherty employed a general election strategy he had used in two previous statewide office campaigns: win by a wide margin in the southwestern part of the state and narrowly win Philadelphia. He also hoped to carry several swing towns, based on his support from several labor unions.

Specter hoped to carry his hometown of Philadelphia, despite the Democrats' 7-2 voter registration advantage there. To this end, Specter sought endorsements among city Democratic leadership, including future mayor John F. Street. Specter hoped that, with wins in suburban areas and the heavily Republican central portion of the state in addition to winning Philadelphia, he would be able to win the election. Specter distanced himself from Governor Dick Thornburgh, who had become unpopular due to his proposals to decrease welfare program spending.

=== Results ===
1980 U.S. Senate election in Pennsylvania
Party	Candidate	Votes	%	±%
Republican	Arlen Specter	2,230,404	50.48%	
Democratic	Peter F. Flaherty	2,122,391	48.04%	
Socialist Workers	Linda Mohrbacher	27,229	0.62%	
Libertarian	David K. Walter	18,595	0.42%	
Consumer	Lee Frissell	16,089	0.36%	
Communist	Frank Kinces	3,334	0.08%	
Majority		108,013	2.44%	
Total votes		4,418,042	100.00%	
Republican hold		Swing		

In the end, Specter defeated Flaherty by approximately 108,000 votes, carrying Philadelphia and its suburbs as well as the central and northeastern portions of the state. Flaherty performed strongest in the western portion of the state, including Cambria, Clarion, Erie and Mercer counties.

== See also ==
- 1980 United States Senate elections
