= 1985 Pittsburgh mayoral election =

- November 5, 1985
Nominee	Richard Caliguiri	Henry Sneath
Party	Democratic	Republican
Popular vote	62,709	17,853
Percentage	76.5%	21.8%
Mayor before election
Richard Caliguiri
Democratic
Elected Mayor
Richard Caliguiri
Democratic

The Mayoral election of 1985 in Pittsburgh, Pennsylvania was held on Tuesday, November 5, 1985. The incumbent mayor, Richard Caliguiri of the Democratic Party chose to run for his third term.

== Results ==
Calagiri won by over 50 points in a city where Democrats outnumber Republicans by a 5 to 1 margin. The Republican nominee was attorney Henry Sneath. A total of 81,997 votes were cast.

Pittsburgh mayoral election, 1985
Party	Candidate	Votes	%	±%
Democratic	Richard Caliguiri (incumbent)	62,709	76.5	
Republican	Henry Sneath	17,853	21.8	
Turnout		81,997		
Democratic hold		Swing		

Preceded by 1981	Pittsburgh mayoral election 1985	Succeeded by 1989
