= 1969 Pittsburgh mayoral election =

- November 4, 1969
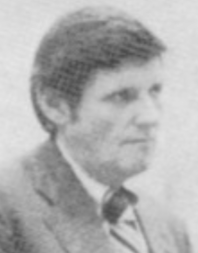

Nominee	Pete Flaherty	John K. Tabor
Party	Democratic	Republican
Popular vote	118,936	62,586
Percentage	65.5%	34.5%
Mayor before election
Joseph M. Barr
Democratic
Elected Mayor
Pete Flaherty
Democratic

The Mayoral election of 1969 in Pittsburgh, Pennsylvania was held on Tuesday, November 4, 1969. The incumbent mayor, Joe Barr of the Democratic Party chose not to run for his third term.

== Primary elections ==
Outspoken City Councilman Pete Flaherty won the Democratic Primary, despite strong opposition from the city's aging party machine. He ran an aggressive campaign and characterized himself to the public as a reform. Court of Common Pleas Judge Harry Kramer, the endorsed candidate, launched a series of sharp personal attacks on Flaherty, which undermined his own campaign and hastened his defeat.

== General election ==
A total of 181,522 votes were cast. As is typical in the heavily Democratic city, Flaherty won by over 30 points. The Republican nominee was John K. Tabor, the state's last Secretary of Internal Affairs (under the 1968 Pennsylvania Constitution, this elected position, considered to be the state's third highest office, was eliminated).

Pittsburgh mayoral election, 1969
Party	Candidate	Votes	%	±%
Democratic	Pete Flaherty	118,936	65.5	
Republican	John K. Tabor	62,586	34.5	
Turnout		181,522		
Democratic hold		Swing		

Preceded by 1965	Pittsburgh mayoral election 1969	Succeeded by 1973
