= 1981 Pittsburgh mayoral election =

- November 3, 1981
Nominee	Richard Caliguiri	Fred Goehringer
Party	Democratic	Republican
Popular vote	66,770	15,273
Percentage	80.0%	18.3%
Mayor before election
Richard Caliguiri
Democratic
Elected Mayor
Richard Caliguiri
Democratic

The Mayoral election of 1981 in Pittsburgh, Pennsylvania was held on Tuesday, November 3, 1981. The incumbent mayor, Richard Caliguiri of the Democratic Party chose to run for his second full term.

== Results ==
Caliguiri won by a particularly large margin, eclipsing 80% of the vote, a figure that even surpasses the city's heavily Democratic voter registration advantage. This is in part due to the particularly polarizing nature of Republican candidate Fred Goehringer, a KDKA broadcaster. Goehringer was a Barry Goldwater admirer but campaigned against Caligiuri's Renaissance III corporate benefits, alienating some GOP power brokers. A total of 83,683 votes were cast.

Pittsburgh mayoral election, 1981
Party	Candidate	Votes	%	±%
Democratic	Richard Caliguiri (incumbent)	66,770	80.0	
Republican	Fred Goehringer	15,273	18.3	
Turnout		83,683		
Democratic hold		Swing		

Preceded by 1977	Pittsburgh mayoral election 1981	Succeeded by 1985
