= 1974 United States Senate election in Pennsylvania =

- November 5, 1974
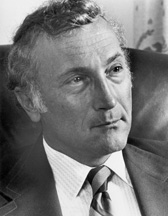

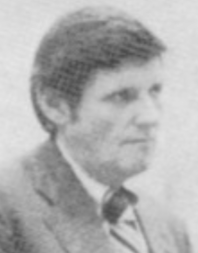
Nominee	Richard Schweiker	Peter Flaherty
Party	Republican	Democratic
Popular vote	1,843,317	1,596,121
Percentage	53.00%	45.89%
- County results Schweiker: 50–60% 60–70% 70–80% Flaherty: 50–60% 60–70%
U.S. senator before election
Richard Schweiker
Republican
Elected U.S. Senator
Richard Schweiker
Republican

The 1974 United States Senate election in Pennsylvania was held on November 5, 1974. Incumbent Republican U.S. Senator Richard Schweiker was re-elected to a second term over Democratic Mayor of Pittsburgh Peter F. Flaherty. This election was the first time since 1938 that an incumbent Republican senator was re-elected to this seat.

== Democratic primary ==
=== Candidates ===
- Herb Denenberg, Pennsylvania insurance commissioner
- Pete Flaherty, mayor of Pittsburgh
- Frank Mesaros
- James M. Quigley, former U.S. representative from Camp Hill

== General election ==
=== Candidates ===
- Pete Flaherty, mayor of Pittsburgh (Democratic)
- Richard Schweiker, incumbent U.S. senator (Republican)
- George W. Shankey (Constitution)

=== Campaign ===
In the general election campaign, Schweiker faced popular Pittsburgh Mayor Peter Flaherty. Both candidates, as highlighted by a New York Times article, "[took] firm stands against inflation, recession, big spending by the Federal Government and abortion on demand." Schweiker, who was endorsed by the AFL–CIO, distanced himself from the Richard Nixon administration, specifically the Watergate scandal, by emphasizing his early calls for Nixon's resignation and the fact that he was on Nixon's "enemies list."

In the end, Schweiker won re-election with 53% of the popular vote, with Flaherty winning 45.9%. Schweiker carried 53 of Pennsylvania's counties, a decrease from the 59 counties he carried in the 1968 election. Flaherty had a strong showing in Allegheny County, which contains his home town of Pittsburgh, which Schweiker had won in 1968. The final election results represented a political divide between the eastern and western portions of the state, Schweiker in the east and Flaherty in the west, with the exception of Flaherty's slim 4,491 vote victory in Philadelphia.

=== Results ===
Pennsylvania United States Senate election, 1974
Party	Candidate	Votes	%	±%
Republican	Richard Schweiker (incumbent)	1,843,317	53.00%	
Democratic	Peter F. Flaherty	1,596,121	45.89%	
Constitution	George W. Shankey	38,004	1.09%	
Write-in		370	0.01%	
Majority		247,196	7.11%	
Turnout		3,477,812		
Republican hold		Swing		

== See also ==
- United States Senate elections, 1974 and 1975
