= Martha Derthick =

American political scientist (1933–2015)

Martha Ann Derthick (June 20, 1933 – January 12, 2015) was an American public administration scholar and academic. She is most known for her work on social security programs, deregulation and federalism.

== Biography ==
Born in Chagrin Falls, Ohio, on June 20, 1933, she graduated from Hiram College in Ohio in 1954. In 1962, she earned a doctorate in political science from Radcliffe College.

She taught and researched at Harvard University between 1964 and 1970, followed by periods at the Joint Center for Urban Studies of the Massachusetts Institute of Technology and Boston College. She then joined the Brookings Institution, where she was director of the government studies program from 1978 to 1983.

From 1983 to 1999, she was the Julia Allen Cooper professor of government and foreign affairs at the University of Virginia.

Derthick's research involved a focus on the unintended consequences of federal mandates for state welfare programs. Derthick favored federalism over centralized government. Among her best known works was Policymaking for Social Security (1979).

Derthick died in Charlottesville, Virginia on January 12, 2015, after a series of strokes.

== Awards ==
Among other awards, Derthick was the recipient of a Guggenheim Fellowship, and she was twice awarded the Louis Brownlow Book Award by the National Academy of Public Administration. She was elected to the American Academy of Arts and Sciences in 1982.

== Works ==
- 2002 Up in Smoke: From Legislation to Litigation in Tobacco Politics
- 2001 Keeping the Compound Republic: Essays on American Federalism (Brookings Institution Press)
- 1999 Dilemmas of Scale in America’s Federal Democracy (Cambridge University Press)
- 1990 Agency Under Stress: The Social Security Administration in American Government
- 1985 The Politics of Deregulation (with Paul J. Quirk)
- 1979 Policymaking for Social Security
- 1975 Uncontrollable Spending for Social Service Grants
