= LaVera Brown =

American activist (1931–2017)

LaVera Brown (1931–2017) was born and raised in Pittsburgh. She attended the University of Pittsburgh (PITT), but left to pursue a career in New York City. In 1970, LaVera Brown became assistant director of The Reading is Fundamental program at the Urban League of Pittsburgh. Later, from 1985 through 1994, she served as Director of Volunteer Services at the United Way, becoming more involved in volunteerism from a local to a national level. Finally, after retiring from this position, Brown served as executive director the NAACP in Pittsburgh.

She was the first African American President of the YWCA Greater Pittsburgh, as well as the first employed woman to serve as YWCA President. Brown's presence encouraged more black women to become more involved within the organization. Brown co-founded the Coalition to Counter Hate Groups in 1979 through joint funding from the YWCA and National Organization for Women. This committee actively participated in rallies to counter the Ku Klux Klan's resurgence in the city of Pittsburgh. The committee also organized a Network of Neighbors to assist homeowners or businesses targeted by the KKK to ensure they had their support.
