= Richard Caliguiri =

American politician

- The commemorative statue by Robert Berks.

55th Mayor of Pittsburgh
- In office April 11, 1977 – May 6, 1988
- Preceded by: Peter Flaherty
- Succeeded by: Sophie Masloff

President of the Pittsburgh City Council
- In office March 14, 1977 – April 11, 1977
- Preceded by: Louis Mason
- Succeeded by: Eugene "Jeep" DePasquale

Member of the Pittsburgh City Council
- In office December 21, 1970 – April 11, 1977
- Preceded by: J. Craig Kuhn
- Succeeded by: Michelle Madoff

Personal details
- Born: October 20, 1931 Pittsburgh, Pennsylvania, U.S.
- Died: May 6, 1988 (aged 56) Pittsburgh, Pennsylvania, U.S.
- Party: Democratic
- Spouse: Jeanne Caligiuri
- Children: 2
- Profession: City Parks Director; City Council President

Richard S. Caliguiri (October 20, 1931 – May 6, 1988) was an American politician who served as the mayor of Pittsburgh, Pennsylvania, from 1977 until his death in 1988.

== Early career ==
Caliguiri was of Italian Arbëresh ancestry, and grew up in the City of Pittsburgh's Greenfield neighborhood. He started his public service career in the CitiParks department of Pittsburgh, later running for the city council in the early 1970s. Caliguiri first ran for mayor as a longshot in 1973, but lost the Democratic primary to popular incumbent mayor Peter Flaherty; Flaherty was so popular that, for the first time in city, history no candidate opposed him in the general election. In his position as President of the Pittsburgh City Council, Caliguiri was appointed interim Mayor in 1977 after Flaherty was appointed Deputy Attorney General in President Jimmy Carter's administration. Caliguiri's departure from the city council necessitated the 1978 special election which allowed independent Democrat Michelle Madoff her seat.

== Mayor of Pittsburgh ==
Caliguiri won the mayor's office substantively in an election later in 1977, and was re-elected twice, serving until his death in 1988. Under Caliguiri's leadership, Pittsburgh began its "Renaissance II" plan, an urban renewal and revitalization plan based on the "Renaissance" plan of former mayor and governor David L. Lawrence. The plan was generally considered a success (especially with the city's skyline) but was hampered by a sharp and permanent downturn in the city's economy and resulting population shifts.

During Caliguiri's tenure, Pittsburgh's economy began a marked downturn during the deindustrialization of the 1980s, with the decline of the large steel producers such as U.S. Steel and Jones and Laughlin. Long time industrial giants which had Pittsburgh headquarters such as Gulf Oil and Koppers were both victims of the 1980s arbitrage and hostile takeover climate. Gulf was absorbed by Chevron and Koppers by British firm Beazer, both resulting in the region losing several thousand high salaried corporate headquarter jobs. The period was also marked by Pittsburgh-based Westinghouse's run up to bankruptcy and reorganization in 1990 (later to become CBS and move to New York) and Rockwell International's move to California and eventually Wisconsin. By the end of Caliguiri's time in office, not a single major steel mill operated in a city once known as the "Steel City", and the city that once boasted more Fortune 500 corporate headquarters than any other US city save for New York and Chicago, had fewer than ten.

In 1986, in response to some citizen complaints and legal action by the ACLU concerning Christmas and Hanukkah displays on government properties, the city, by order of Mayor Caliguiri, placed a plaque entitled "Salute to Liberty" and reading, "During this holiday season, the city of Pittsburgh salutes liberty. Let these festive lights remind us that we are the keepers of the flame of liberty and our legacy of freedom." Three years later, by two 5–4 decisions, the United States Supreme Court upheld in part and denied in part the city's position in County of Allegheny v. American Civil Liberties Union.

== Illness and death ==
In the late 1980s, Caliguiri was diagnosed with amyloidosis, a rare and serious protein disorder. Coincidentally, within a few years in the mid to late 1980s, three of Pennsylvania's most prominent political leaders were afflicted with the disorder. Caliguiri as well as longtime Erie Mayor Louis Tullio and Pennsylvania Governor Bob Casey were all diagnosed with the incurable and usually fatal disease.

Caliguiri refused to allow his declining health to affect his leadership and did not step down as mayor. He died in 1988 at the age of 56, and was interred in Pittsburgh's Roman Catholic Calvary Cemetery.

== Honors ==
In October 1990, a commemorative statue of Caliguiri sculpted by Robert Berks was dedicated on the steps of the Downtown Pittsburgh City-County Building on Grant Street. According to Caliguiri's son David, previous ideas had included a renaming of Grant Street and the Pittsburgh Civic (later Mellon) Arena. Caliguiri, who graduated from Taylor Allderdice High School in 1950, was inducted into their alumni hall of fame in 2010.

== Film career ==
Caliguiri is spotlighted in a cameo playing himself in the sport/cult classic The Fish That Saved Pittsburgh in 1979. Near the middle of the film he is seen on the extreme right introducing to a cheering crowd the city's basketball team at an indoor rally. He slips off camera for a few seconds and then is seen again patting them on the back and shaking hands with the actors and coach, before he extends across the crowd to shake Julius Erving's hand (one of the "actors" on the team) and is met warmly by a surprised Dr. J.

On May 18, 1987, Caliguiri was a guest on a national broadcast of The Today Show as it filmed in Pittsburgh.

== Electoral history ==
- 1977 Race for Pittsburgh Mayor
  - Richard Caliguiri (I), 48%
  - Thomas Foerster (D), 44%
  - Joseph Cosetti (R), 9%
- 1981 Race for Pittsburgh Mayor
  - Richard Caliguiri (D), 80%
  - Fred Goehringer (R), 18%
- 1985 Race for Pittsburgh Mayor
  - Richard Caliguiri (D), 77%
  - Henry Sneath (R), 22%

Political offices
Preceded by Peter Flaherty	Mayor of Pittsburgh^{1} 1977–1988	Succeeded by Sophie Masloff
Pittsburgh City Council
Preceded by Louis Mason	President of the Pittsburgh City Council; 1977	Succeeded by Eugene "Jeep" DePasquale
Preceded by J. Craig Kuhn	Member of the Pittsburgh City Council; 1970–1977	Succeeded by Michelle Madoff
Notes and references
1. Interim Mayor from 1977 to 1978
