= 1968 United States Senate election in Pennsylvania =

- November 5, 1968
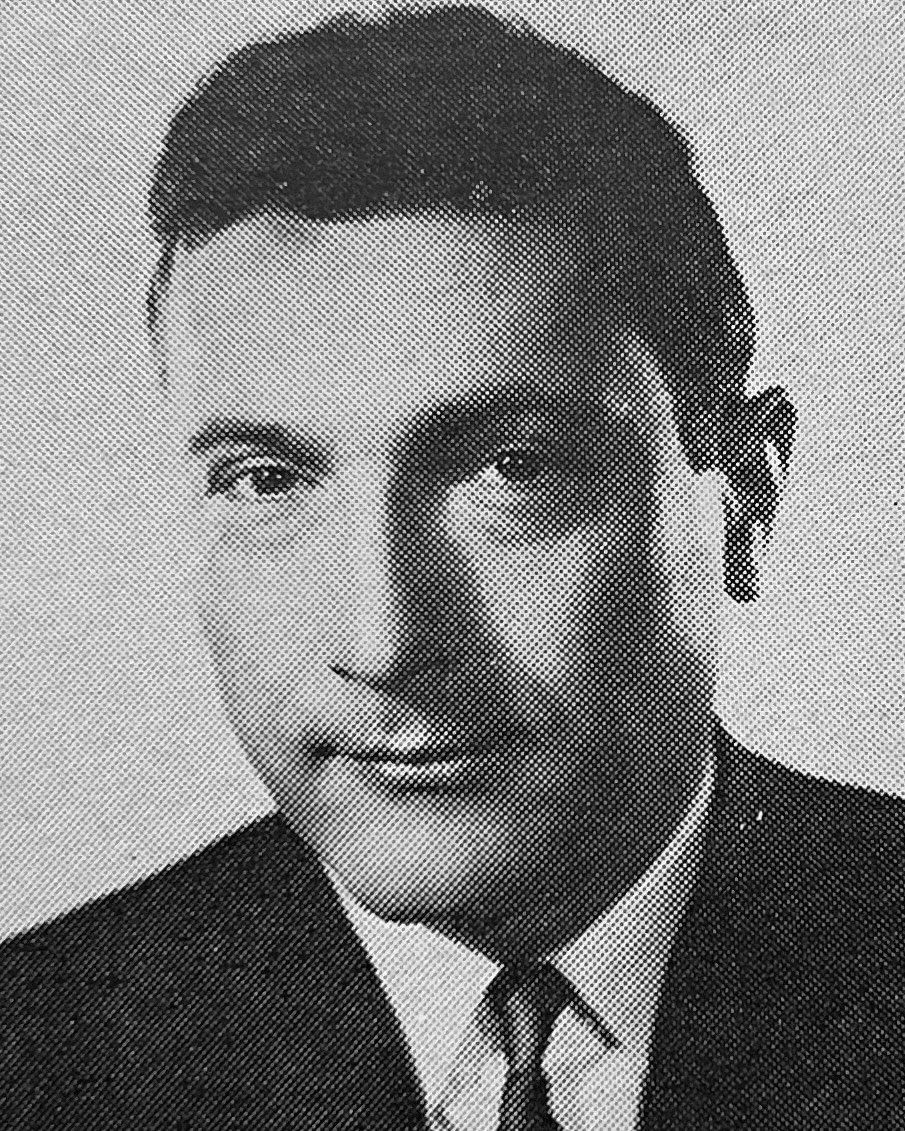

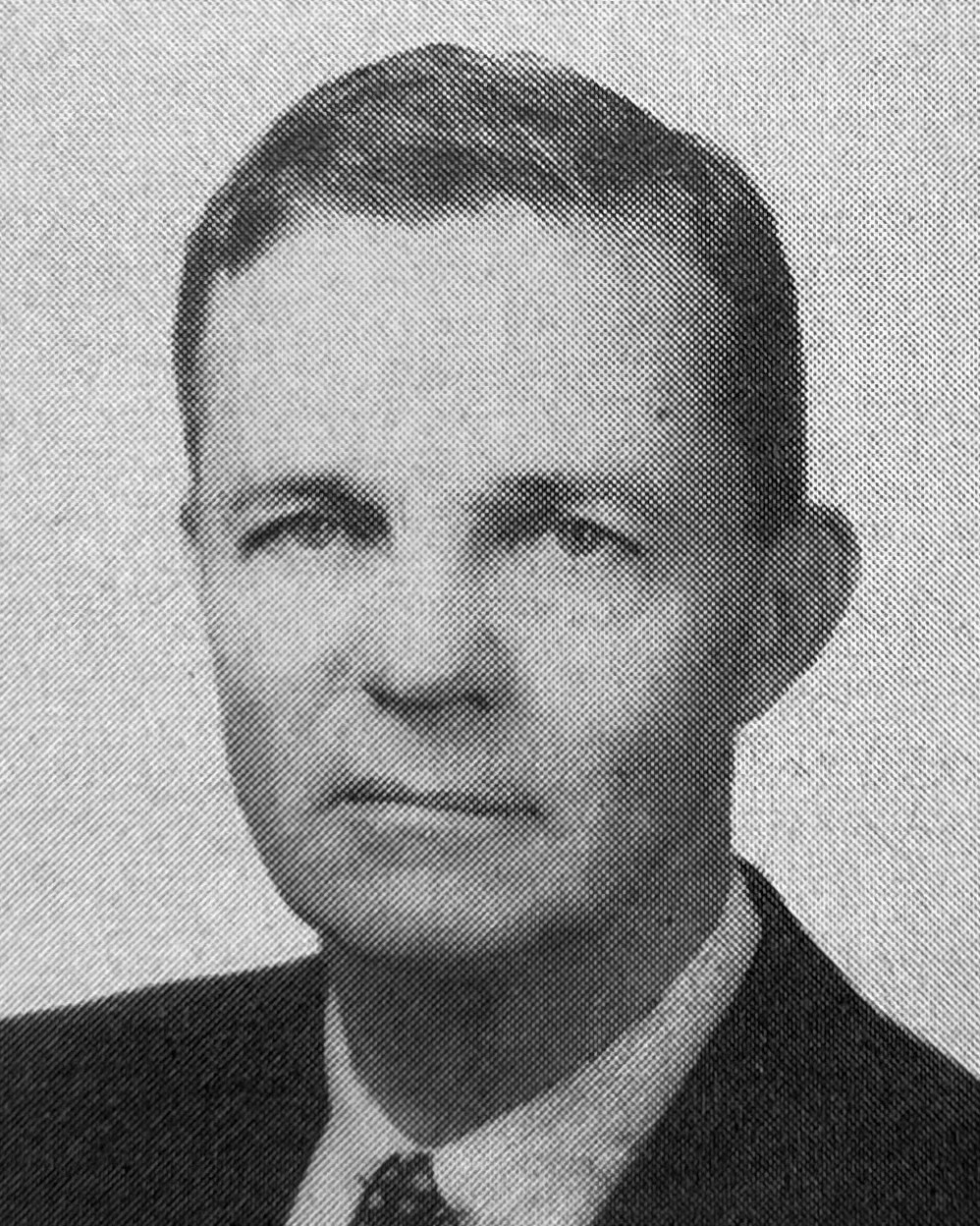
Nominee	Richard Schweiker	Joseph S. Clark Jr.
Party	Republican	Democratic
Popular vote	2,399,762	2,117,662
Percentage	51.90%	45.80%
- County results Schweiker: 40–50% 50–60% 60–70% 70–80% Clark: 50–60% 60–70%
U.S. senator before election
Joseph S. Clark, Jr.
Democratic
Elected U.S. Senator
Richard Schweiker
Republican

The 1968 United States Senate election in Pennsylvania was held on November 5, 1968. Incumbent Democratic U.S. Senator Joseph S. Clark Jr. sought re-election to a third term but was defeated by Republican U.S. Representative Richard Schweiker. This election marked the last time that an incumbent Senator lost re-election to this seat.

== Democratic primary ==
=== Candidates ===
- Joseph S. Clark Jr., incumbent U.S. Senator since 1957
- John Herman Dent, U.S. Representative from Greensburg

== General election ==
=== Candidates ===
- Pearl Chertov (Socialist Workers)
- Joseph S. Clark Jr., incumbent U.S. Senator since 1957 (Democratic)
- Frank W. Gaydosh (Constitution)
- Benson Perry (Socialist Labor)
- Richard Schweiker, U.S. Representative from Norristown (Republican)

=== Results ===
General election results
Party	Candidate	Votes	%	±%
Republican	Richard Schweiker	2,399,762	51.90%	
Democratic	Joseph S. Clark Jr. (incumbent)	2,117,662	45.80%	
Constitution	Frank W. Gaydosh	96,742	2.09%	
Socialist Labor	Benson Perry	7,198	0.16%	
Socialist Workers	Pearl Chertov	2,743	0.06%	
N/A	Other	111	0.00%	
Republican gain from Democratic				

== See also ==
- United States Senate elections, 1968
