= Bayless Manning =

American lawyer (1923-2011)

- Born: Bayless Andrew Manning; March 29, 1923; Bristow, Oklahoma, U.S.
- Died: September 18, 2011 (aged 88); Boise, Idaho, U.S.
- Education: Yale University (BA, LLB)

Bayless Andrew Manning (March 29, 1923 – September 18, 2011) was an American lawyer, law professor, writer and expert of corporate law. He served as the dean of Stanford Law School from 1964 to 1971. He left Stanford in 1971 and became the first president of the Council on Foreign Relations.

== Education and career ==
Manning worked as the editor of the Yale Law Journal as a law student before graduating from Yale Law School as valedictorian of the class of 1949. He then clerked for Justice Stanley Forman Reed, an Associate Justice of the United States Supreme Court.

Manning taught as a professor at Yale University from 1955 to 1964. He simultaneously served as a member of the President's Advisory Panel on Ethics and Conflicts of Interest in Government beginning in 1960. Manning became the dean of Stanford Law School from 1964 to 1971. In 1971, Cyrus R. Vance and David Rockefeller soon appointed Manning as the first president of the Council of Foreign Relations (CFR). Following the end of his tenure at CFR, Manning joined Paul, Weiss, Rifkind, Wharton & Garrison, a law firm based in New York City.

In 2001, Manning was awarded the Certificate of Meritorious Achievement from the United States Office of Government Ethics for the Executive Branch.

Manning moved to Boise, Idaho, in the late 1980s. He died at his home in Boise on September 18, 2011, at the age of 88. He was survived by his wife, Alexandra Zekovic, five children, and six grandchildren.

== See also ==
- List of law clerks for the sixth seat of the Supreme Court of the United States
