= Jackson State killings =

Police killings of students (1970)

Coordinates: 32°17′51″N 90°12′27″W

- Location: Jackson, Mississippi
- Date: May 15, 1970; 12:05 a.m. (Central: UTC−6)
- Deaths: 2
- Injuries: 12
- Victims: Phillip Lafayette Gibbs; James Earl Green
- Perpetrators: Jackson Police Department; Mississippi Highway Patrol

The Jackson State killings occurred on May 15, 1970, at Jackson State College (now Jackson State University) in Jackson, Mississippi. On May 14, 1970, city and state police confronted a group of students outside a campus dormitory. Shortly after midnight, the police opened fire, killing two students and injuring twelve. The event happened 11 days after the Kent State shootings, in which National Guardsmen killed four students at Kent State University in Ohio during a protest against the Vietnam War. The Kent State event had first captured national attention.

== Timeline ==
On the evening of Thursday, May 14, a group of around 100 black students had gathered on Lynch Street (named after the black Reconstruction era US Representative John R. Lynch), which bisected the campus. African-American youths were reportedly pelting rocks at white motorists driving down this road—frequently the site of confrontations between white and black Jackson residents.

Tensions rose higher when a rumor spread around campus that Charles Evers—a local politician, civil rights leader and the brother of slain activist Medgar Evers—and his wife had been killed, according to Lynch Street: The May 1970 Slayings at Jackson State College. The situation escalated when a non-Jackson State student set a dump truck on fire."

The police responded in force. At least 75 police officers from the city of Jackson and the Mississippi Highway Patrol attempted to control the crowd while firemen extinguished the fires. After firefighters left the scene shortly before midnight, the police moved to disperse the crowd that had gathered in front of Alexander Hall, a women's dormitory.

Advancing to within 50 to 100 feet (15 to 30 m) of the crowd, officers at roughly 12:05 a.m opened fire on the dormitory.

The exact cause of the shooting and the moments leading up to it are unclear. Authorities say they saw a sniper on one of the building's upper floors and were being shot at from all directions. Later, two city policemen and one state patrolman reported minor injuries from flying glass. An FBI search for evidence of sniper fire found none. Students later claimed that they had not provoked the officers. The gunfire lasted for 30 seconds, with more than 460 shots being fired by a reported 40 state highway patrolmen, who used shotguns from a distance of 30 to 50 feet. Every window was shattered by gunfire on the narrow side of the building facing Lynch Street.

The crowd scattered, and a number of people were trampled, or cut by falling glass. Phillip Lafayette Gibbs, 21, a junior, and James Earl Green, 17, a senior and miler at nearby Jim Hill High School, were killed, and twelve others were wounded. Gibbs was fatally shot near Alexander Hall by buckshot, and Green was killed behind the police line in front of B. F. Roberts Hall, also by shotgun.

== Aftermath ==
The May 15 Jackson State shootings led to a surge of the protest movement throughout the region.

President Richard Nixon established the President's Commission on Campus Unrest to investigate both the Jackson State and Kent State events. Public hearings were held in Los Angeles, Washington, DC, and at Kent State. No arrests were made in connection with the deaths at Jackson State, but the Commission concluded "that the 28-second fusillade from police officers was an unreasonable, unjustified overreaction.... A broad barrage of gunfire in response to reported and unconfirmed sniper fire is never warranted."

The university has memorialized the occurrence by naming the area of the shootings the Gibbs-Green Plaza, after the two young men killed. The plaza is a large, multi-level brick and concrete patio and mall on the eastern side of the school's campus; it borders J. R. Lynch Street and links Alexander Hall to the University Green. A large stone monument in front of Alexander Hall near the plaza also honors the two victims. Damage is still visible on the façade of Alexander Hall; it was caused by the rounds fired by the police.

In December 1970, a federal grand jury was discharged after it had failed to produce an indictment or written findings in a five-month recess. It had summoned about 40 state patrolmen and 26 city police officers.

A long-awaited formal public apology was granted at Jackson State University's 2021 commencement. The apology reflected 51 years of contemplation regarding the event, historically known as "The Jackson State Killings." Gibbs and Green were awarded posthumous honorary doctorate degrees at the ceremony, which were accepted by family members on their behalf.

Commencement speakers represented local and state leaders of Mississippi: Mayor Chokwe Antar Lumumba of Jackson, and State Senator Hillman Terome Frazier. The leaders said that the formal apology was to "…publicly atone for the sins of our past and proclaim a new identity of dignity, equity and justice".

== See also ==
- Orangeburg massacre
- List of unarmed African Americans killed by law enforcement officers in the United States
- List of killings by law enforcement officers in the United States
- List of incidents of civil unrest in the United States
- List of school shootings in the United States by death toll
