= Richard Schweiker =

American politician (1926–2015)

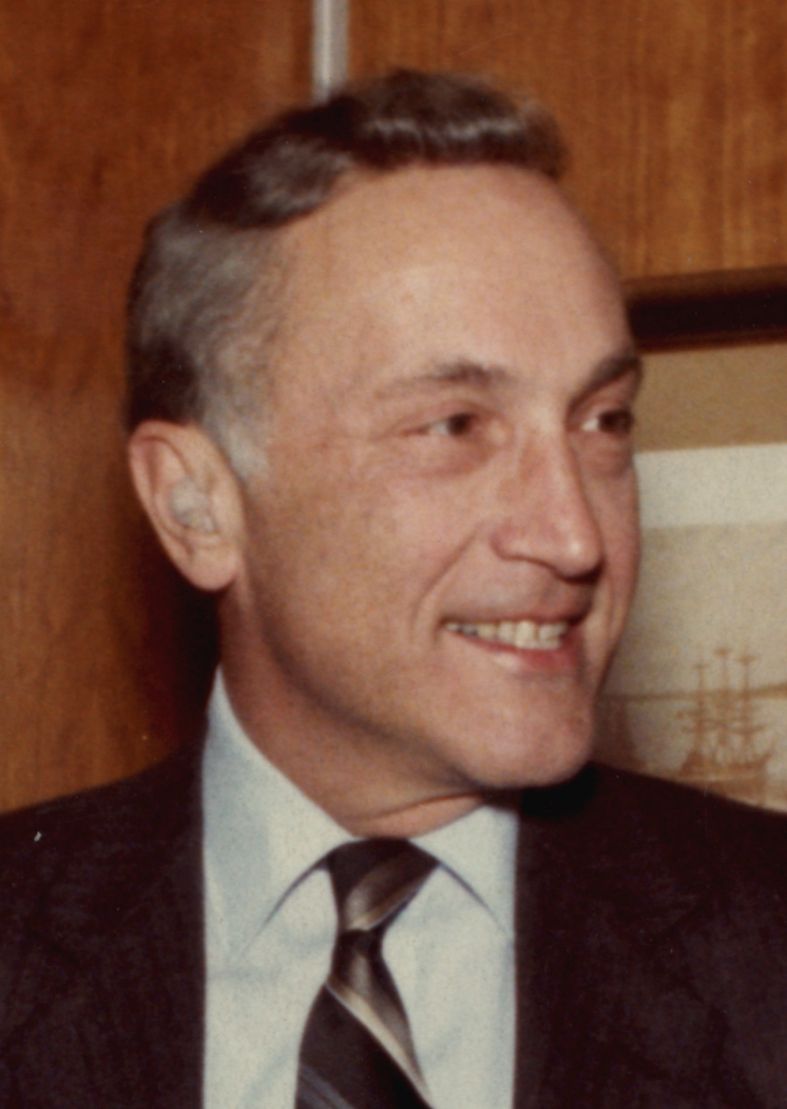
- Schweiker, 1981

14th United States Secretary of Health and Human Services
- In office January 22, 1981 – February 3, 1983
- President: Ronald Reagan
- Preceded by: Patricia Roberts Harris
- Succeeded by: Margaret Heckler

United States Senator from Pennsylvania
- In office January 3, 1969 – January 3, 1981
- Preceded by: Joseph S. Clark Jr.
- Succeeded by: Arlen Specter

Member of the U.S. House of Representatives from Pennsylvania's 13th district
- In office January 3, 1961 – January 3, 1969
- Preceded by: John Lafore
- Succeeded by: Lawrence Coughlin

Personal details
- Born: Richard Schultz Schweiker; June 1, 1926 Norristown, Pennsylvania, U.S.
- Died: July 31, 2015 (aged 89) Pomona, New Jersey, U.S.
- Party: Republican
- Spouse: Claire Coleman (m. 1955; died 2013)
- Children: 5
- Education: Slippery Rock University; Pennsylvania State University (BA)

Military service
- Branch: United States Navy
- Service years: 1944–1946
- Conflict: World War II

Richard Schultz Schweiker (June 1, 1926 – July 31, 2015) was an American businessman and politician who served as the 14th U.S. secretary of health and human services under President Ronald Reagan from 1981 to 1983. A member of the Republican Party, he previously served as a U.S. representative from 1961 to 1969 and a U.S. senator from 1969 to 1981 from Pennsylvania. Schweiker was Reagan's running mate during his unsuccessful 1976 presidential campaign.

== Early life ==
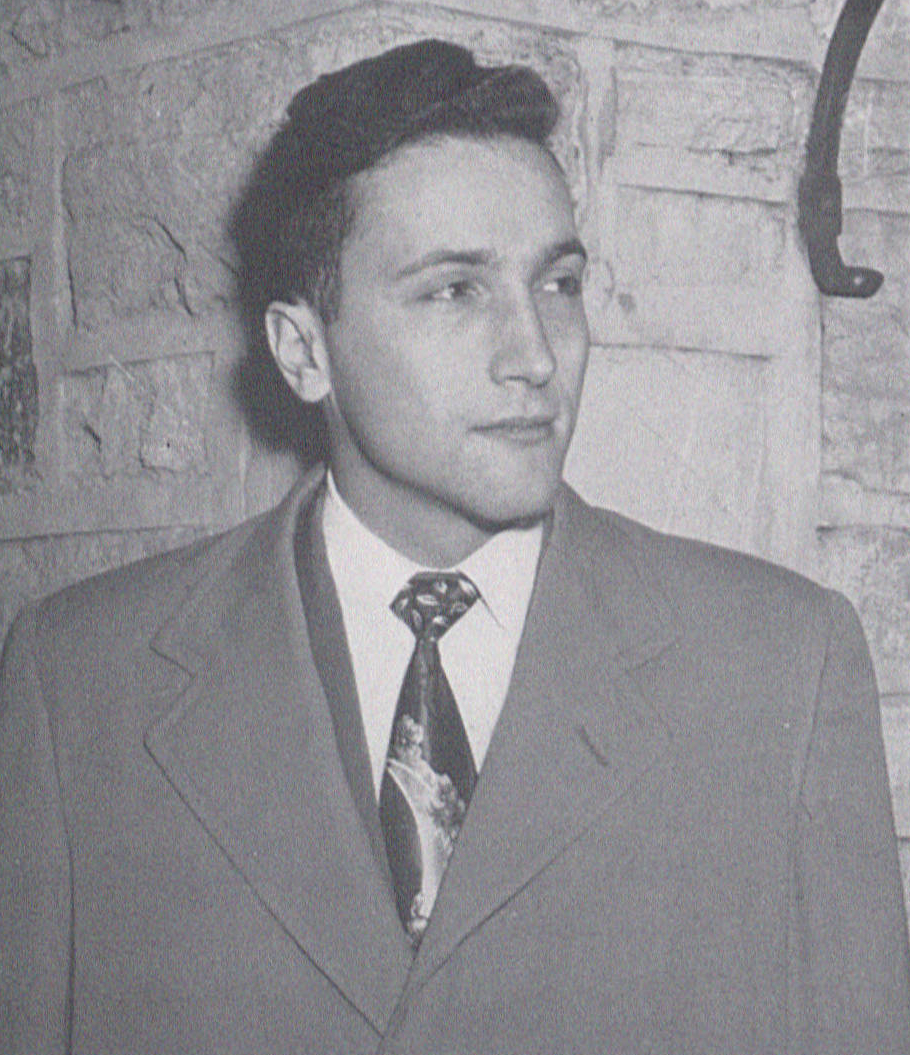
Schweiker in the Pennsylvania State University yearbook, 1950

Schweiker was born in Norristown, Pennsylvania, on June 1, 1926, the son of Malcolm Alderfer Schweiker Sr. and his wife, the former Blanche R. Schultz. His father and his uncle worked in the tiling business for some decades. He was born into a family of Schwenckfelders and was a member of the church himself.

Schweiker received his early education at public schools in Worcester, and graduated from Norristown Area High School as valedictorian in 1944. During World War II, he served in the U.S. Navy aboard the aircraft carrier USS Tarawa (CV-40), being discharged with the rank of electronics technician (second class) in 1946.

Following his military service, Schweiker attended Slippery Rock State College for two years before transferring to Pennsylvania State University. He received a Bachelor of Arts degree in psychology from Penn State in 1950, graduating as a member of the Phi Kappa Sigma. He then joined his family's business, American Olean Tile Company, rising from an assistant in the personnel department to the company's president within a few years. He also became active in local Republican politics, serving as a precinct committeeman, and founded the Montgomery County chapter of the Young Republicans, of which he was president from 1952 to 1954. He was selected as an alternate delegate to the Republican National Convention in 1952 and in 1956.

== Marriage and family ==
On September 10, 1955, Schweiker married Claire Joan Coleman, a former host of the children's television show Romper Room, in Philadelphia, Pennsylvania (1954–1956). They had two sons and three daughters.

== Political career ==
=== U.S. House of Representatives ===
In 1960, Schweiker was elected to the U.S. House of Representatives from Pennsylvania's 13th congressional district. At the time, the Montgomery County-based district included Schweiker's home town of Norristown and several affluent suburban communities in the Philadelphia Main Line. A moderate to liberal Republican, he defeated conservative incumbent John A. Lafore, Jr., in the Republican primary. In the general election, he defeated Democrat Warren Ballard, a law professor at Temple University, 62%–38%. He was elected to three more terms, never receiving less than 59% of the vote.

During his tenure in the House, Schweiker served on the Armed Services Committee and the Government Operations Committee. He sponsored legislation, signed into law in 1965, that provided cash awards to United States Armed Forces personnel for cost-cutting ideas. Schweiker voted for the Civil Rights Acts of 1964 and 1968 and the Voting Rights Act of 1965. He also supported the creation of Medicare, increases in Social Security, and federal rent subsidies. He considered running for governor of Pennsylvania in 1966, but state Republican leaders persuaded him not to in favor of then-Lieutenant Governor Raymond P. Shafer.

=== U.S. Senate ===
In 1968, Schweiker was elected to the U.S. Senate, defeating two-term Democratic incumbent Joseph S. Clark Jr., by more than 280,000 votes. He was the only successful Republican statewide candidate in an election that saw Hubert Humphrey win Pennsylvania by over 170,000 votes. Continuing his progressive reputation in the Senate, Schweiker opposed the Vietnam War and President Richard Nixon's nominations of Clement Haynsworth and G. Harrold Carswell to the U.S. Supreme Court, and had an 89% rating from the liberal Americans for Democratic Action. He also supported school prayer and opposed stronger widespread gun control. In 1975, alongside fellow Republicans Clifford Case and Jacob Javits, Schweiker was a co-sponsor of Ted Kennedy's Health Security Act, a bill proposing universal health coverage in America through a government-run program.

During his tenure in the Senate, Schweiker served as the ranking member on both the Labor and Human Resources Committee and the Labor, Health, and Human Services Appropriations Subcommittee. He was a pioneer in increasing government spending on diabetes mellitus research, authoring and sponsoring of the National Diabetes Mellitus Research and Education Act. This legislation, passed by Congress in 1974, established the National Commission on Diabetes to create a long-term plan to fight the disease.

Schweiker was reelected in 1974, defeating Democratic Pittsburgh mayor Peter F. Flaherty in a year when many Republican incumbents lost due to political fallout from the Watergate scandal. He won 53% of the vote, the highest of any senator from Pennsylvania since 1946 at the time. He was the first Republican senator ever endorsed by the Pennsylvania AFL–CIO, and received 49% of the vote in heavily Democratic Philadelphia.

==== Church Committee ====
From 1975 to 1976, Schweiker was a member of the Select Committee to Study Governmental Operations with Respect to Intelligence Activities, headed by Idaho Senator Frank Church, investigating illegal domestic activities of the United States government's intelligence agencies. The "Church Committee" found that allegations of CIA plots to assassinate Cuban Premier Fidel Castro during John F. Kennedy's presidency went unreported to the Warren Commission even though CIA director Allen Dulles was a member of the Commission. These findings led Schweiker to call for a reinvestigation of Kennedy's assassination. Church appointed Schweiker and Colorado Senator Gary Hart to be a two-person subcommittee to look into the "performance or non-performance" of intelligence agencies during the initial investigation of the assassination. In October 1975, Schweiker said at a press conference that the subcommittee had developed "significant leads" and was investigating three conspiracy theories, adding, "I think the Warren Commission is like a house of cards. It's going to collapse." In its final report, the Church Committee called the initial investigation deficient and criticized the response of CIA and FBI, but stated that it had "not uncovered any evidence sufficient to justify a conclusion that there was a conspiracy to assassinate President Kennedy."

On May 14, 1976, Schweiker told CBS Morning News that he believed the CIA and FBI had lied to the Warren Commission. On June 27, 1976, he appeared on CBS's Face the Nation and said that the Commission made a "fatal mistake" by relying on the CIA and FBI instead of its own investigators. Schweiker also said that he felt it was possible that the White House was involved in a cover-up, and in regards to Lee Harvey Oswald that "Everywhere you look with him, there are the fingerprints of intelligence". He contributed the introduction to a 1976 edition of Accessories After the Fact by Sylvia Meagher, a work critical of the Warren Commission.

=== Vice Presidential consideration ===
In 1976, Ronald Reagan made a serious challenge against President Gerald Ford in the 1976 Republican Party presidential primaries. Before the opening of the 1976 Republican National Convention, Reagan attempted to attract moderate delegates by promising to name Schweiker, who had a moderate voting record in the Senate, as his running mate. This was unusual because the tradition was for a nominee to name a running mate only after winning the nomination. In response, conservative Republicans, including U.S. Senator Jesse Helms of North Carolina, encouraged a movement to draft Conservative Party U.S. Senator James L. Buckley of New York as the G.O.P. nominee. Ford won the nomination on the first ballot by a razor-thin margin and selected Bob Dole for vice president.

Reagan's naming him as his running mate came as a surprise to Schweiker, as the two did not know each other. Schweiker subsequently adopted a much more conservative voting record; his rating from the liberal group Americans for Democratic Action dropped to 15% in 1977.

In 1980, Schweiker announced he would not seek reelection to the Senate.

Reagan won the presidential nomination in 1980 but chose George H. W. Bush, not Schweiker, as his running mate, and won the election.

== Health secretary ==
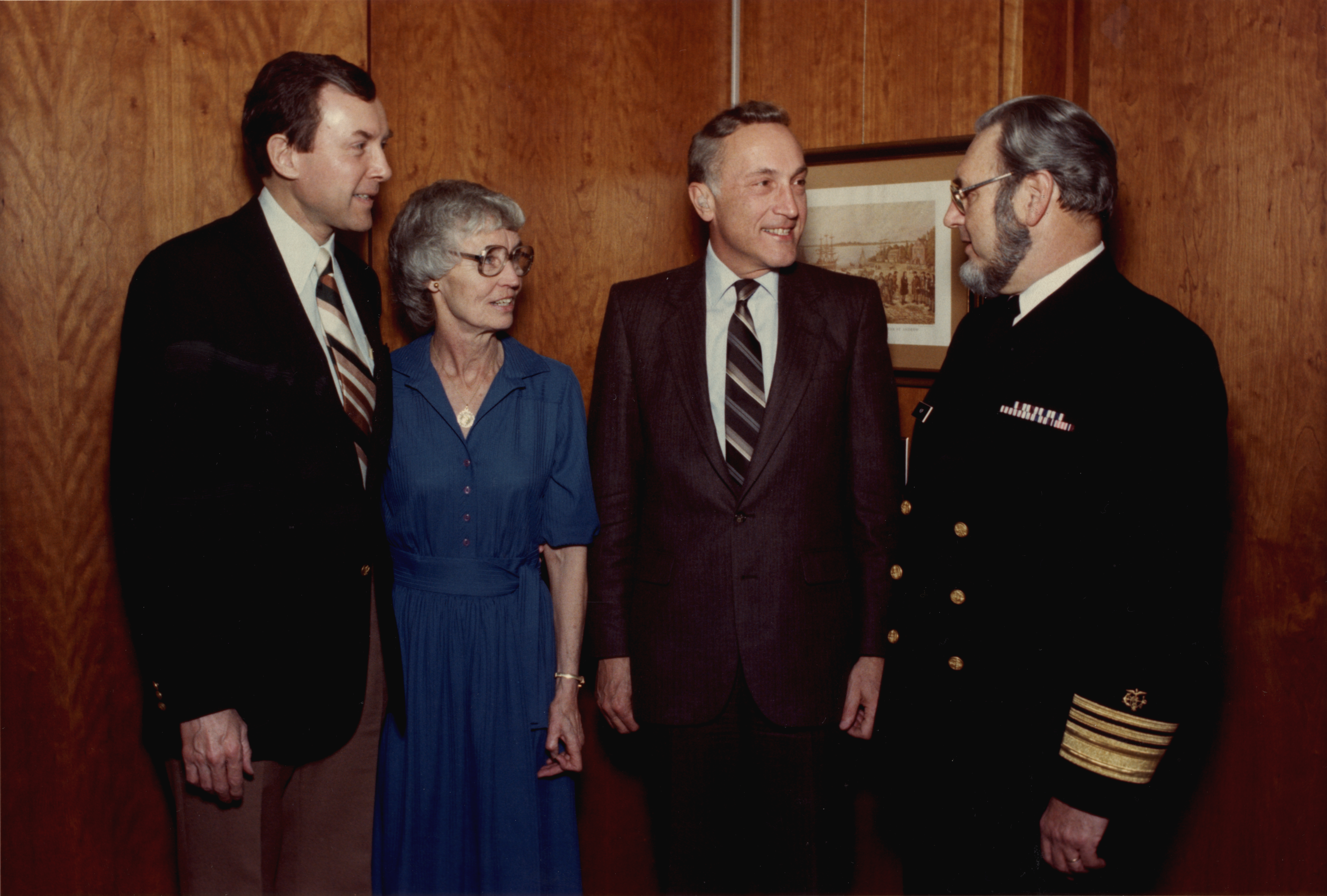
Surgeon General of the United States Dr. C. Everett Koop (far right), Elizabeth Koop (left), Utah Senator Orrin Hatch (far left), and HHS Secretary Richard Schweiker (right), (November 16, 1981).

Schweiker accepted President Reagan's appointment as U.S. Secretary of Health and Human Services in January 1981. He held the post until he resigned in February 1983. During his tenure, he worked with Reagan and House Speaker Tip O'Neill to reform Social Security, put greater emphasis on preventive medicine, reduce Medicare and food stamp grants to the states, and restrict welfare eligibility. He proposed reducing Social Security benefits to recipients who retired before age 65, but both Democrats and Republicans in Congress rejected the idea.

== Political legacy ==
During his tenure in public service, Schweiker was an ardent supporter of a volunteer army. He coauthored the book How to End the Draft, eventually used as the blueprint for shifting the country to a fully volunteer army. He also pushed for the Schweiker Act of 1965, which gave cash awards to military personnel who suggested money-saving ideas, ultimately resulting in savings of more than $1 billion to taxpayers.

As ranking Republican on the Senate health subcommittee, Schweiker worked on legislation to combat diabetes, cancer, heart disease, sickle cell anemia, and lead paint poisoning. He focused heavily on diabetes and authored bills creating the National Commission on Diabetes Advisory Board, pushing for passage of the National Diabetes Act in 1972. Those efforts led to increased federal funding for diabetes programs and were a prototype for legislatively constructing a research effort across all National Institutes of Health operations and the Centers for Disease Control. Some who worked with Schweiker or benefited from his initiative called him the "Patron Saint of the Pancreas" for his devotion to the cause.

== Later life and death ==
From 1983 to 1994, Schweiker served as president of the American Council of Life Insurance, now known as the American Council of Life Insurers. He lived in McLean, Virginia, for many years. At the time of his death, he lived with one of his daughters in Herndon, Virginia. He also owned a home in Ocean City, New Jersey.

On July 31, 2015, Schweiker died of complications from an infection at the AtlantiCare Regional Medical Center in Pomona, New Jersey.

== Authored works ==
- How to End the Draft: The Case for an All-Volunteer Army. National Press. 1967. Co-authored with Congressmen Robert T. Stafford, Frank J. Horton, Garner E. Shriver, and Charles W. Whalen, Jr.
- Preface to Meagher, Sylvia (1976). Accessories After the Fact: The Warren Commission, the Authorities & the Report. Vintage Books. ISBN 978-0394716305.
- Laxalt, Paul; Williamson, Richard S., eds. (1980). "Health Care: Making a Good System Better". A Changing America: Conservatives View the '80s From the United States Senate. Regnery. ISBN 978-0895266767.

== See also ==
- Rockefeller Republican
- List of Pennsylvania State University people
- Chaney v. Schweiker

U.S. House of Representatives
Preceded by John A. Lafore	Member of the U.S. House of Representatives from Pennsylvania's 13th congressional district 1961–1969	Succeeded by Lawrence Coughlin
Party political offices
Preceded by James Van Zandt	Republican nominee for U.S. Senator from Pennsylvania (Class 3); 1968, 1974	Succeeded by Arlen Specter
U.S. Senate
Preceded by Joseph S. Clark, Jr.	U.S. senator (Class 3) from Pennsylvania; 1969–1981; Served alongside: Hugh D. Scott, John Heinz	Succeeded by Arlen Specter
Preceded by Jacob Javits	Ranking Member of the Senate Labor and Human Resources Committee; 1979–1981	Succeeded by Ted Kennedy
Political offices
Preceded by Patricia R. Harris	United States Secretary of Health and Human Services; 1981–1983	Succeeded by Margaret Heckler
