= Peter F. Flaherty =

American mayor (1924–2005)

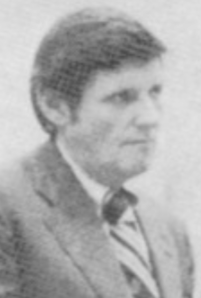

Member of the Allegheny County Board of Commissioners
- In office January 2, 1984 – January 1, 1996
- Preceded by: Cyril Wecht
- Succeeded by: Michael Dawida

16th United States Deputy Attorney General
- In office April 12, 1977 – December 9, 1977
- President: Jimmy Carter
- Preceded by: Harold R. Tyler, Jr.
- Succeeded by: Benjamin Civiletti

54th Mayor of Pittsburgh
- In office January 5, 1970 – April 11, 1977
- Preceded by: Joe Barr
- Succeeded by: Richard Caligiuri

Personal details
- Born: Peter Francis Flaherty; June 25, 1924 North Side, Pittsburgh, Pennsylvania, U.S.
- Died: April 18, 2005 (aged 80) Mt. Lebanon, Pennsylvania, U.S.
- Party: Democratic
- Education: Carlow University (BA); University of Notre Dame (JD); University of Pittsburgh (MPA)

Military service
- Branch/service: United States Army
- Years of service: 1943–1946
- Rank: Captain
- Battles/wars: World War II

Peter Francis Flaherty (June 25, 1924 – April 18, 2005) was an American politician and attorney. He served as assistant district attorney of Allegheny County from 1957 to 1964, a member of the Pittsburgh City Council from 1966 to 1970, the 54th mayor of Pittsburgh from 1970 to 1977, United States deputy attorney general during the Carter administration from 1977 to 1978, and county commissioner of Allegheny County from 1984 to 1996.

== Early life and education ==
Flaherty was born and raised on the North Side of Pittsburgh. He served in the United States Army Air Corps from 1943 to 1946 during World War II, reaching the rank of Captain. Flaherty was honorably discharged and used the G.I. Bill to become the first in his family to attend college. He graduated from Carlow University in three years, then graduated cum laude from Notre Dame Law School and was admitted to the Pennsylvania Bar Association. He then established his own legal practice which included the Pittsburgh Steelers among his clients. In 1971, he earned a Masters in Public Administration from the University of Pittsburgh Graduate School of Public and International Affairs.

== Career ==
In 1965, Flaherty led the Democratic Party ticket when he was elected to the Pittsburgh City Council. He was elected mayor in the 1969 Pittsburgh mayoral election, defeating Judge Harry A. Kramer in the primary election. In the general election Flaherty beat the Republican, John K. Tabor. Four years later, in the 1973 election, Flaherty was re-elected by winning the Democratic primary, the Republican primary, and the Constitutional party primaries.

During his seven years as mayor, Flaherty reduced the payroll by almost one third, balanced the budget each year without a tax increase or any new taxes, reduced the taxes by two million dollars, eliminated the wage tax for three years, and left office with a substantial budget surplus and taxes lower than when he took office. He increased the amount of street repaving from less than ten miles in 1969 to more than 100 miles in his last year in office. This was accomplished in part by using city personnel and a city owned asphalt plant instead of continuing to contract out the work.

Flaherty was featured in a book on city governing called City Money: Political Processes, Fiscal Strain, and Retrenchment by Terry N. Clark and Laura Crowley Ferguson, Columbia University Press 1983. Throughout most of his tenure as mayor, Flaherty successfully opposed the Early Action Program, a project which included the development of Skybus. At the end of his tenure, the dispute over this program was resolved by a study performed through the agreement of Flaherty, the county commissioners, representatives of labor and the City Council. The study recommended the abandonment of Skybus and the use, instead, of steel wheel on steel rail technology. This recommendation was adopted by the County transit agency.

His administration's track record on racial and minority equality was mixed. He was criticized in the African-American community for opposing busing desegregation, and he dismantled the existing majority-black Freedom House Ambulance Service in favor of a new, predominantly white city paramedic system, an action which some attributed to the mayor's racism. One of his early appointments was former Duquesne University and Boston Celtics basketball star Chuck Cooper, as Director of Parks and Recreation. He eliminated the Police Tactical Police Force unit, which was associated by African-Americans with racism during the late 1960s and especially the disturbances that erupted after the assassination of Martin Luther King Jr. Pittsburgh was the first major city in Pennsylvania to adopt a successful affirmative action program for minorities and women.

=== Deputy attorney general ===
Flaherty was a prominent supporter of Jimmy Carter during the 1976 United States presidential election. After Carter was elected, he nominated Flaherty to serve as the 16th United States deputy attorney general. Flaherty served under Griffin Bell and was succeeded in office by Benjamin Civiletti. After Flaherty left the Carter administration, he supported the Ted Kennedy 1980 presidential campaign.

=== Senate and gubernatorial elections ===
Flaherty was the Democratic Party nominee in the 1974 United States Senate election in Pennsylvania, losing to incumbent Republican Senator Richard Schweiker. Flaherty was also the Democratic nominee for governor of Pennsylvania in 1978 Pennsylvania gubernatorial election, losing in the general election to Republican Dick Thornburgh, who would go on to become United States attorney general under President Ronald Reagan and President George H. W. Bush. In 1980, he again ran statewide as the Democratic nominee for United States Senate. Flaherty was defeated by Republican Arlen Specter, winning 48% of the vote.

=== County Commissioner ===
Flaherty was elected to the Allegheny County Board of Commissioners in November 1983. He supported longtime commissioner and fellow Democrat Tom Foerster's long-term goal of building a world class airport in Allegheny County. This became a reality in 1992 when the Pittsburgh International Airport was opened and later named its terminal in Foerster's honor.

He supported Foerster and served as Foerster's intermediary with the City of Pittsburgh to build a new county jail to replace a facility which was designed by famous architect Henry Hobson Richardson in the 1800s. The team of Foerster as chairman and Pete Flaherty as the second Democrat on the three-member Board of County Commissioners served together for three four year terms. Both Foerster and Flaherty were defeated for re-election in 1995.

== Death ==
Flaherty died on April 21, 2005, in Mt. Lebanon, Pennsylvania, at the age of 80. He is interred in the Roman Catholic Queen of Heaven Cemetery, Pittsburgh, Pennsylvania.

== Electoral history ==
- 1969 Race for Pittsburgh Mayor
  - Pete Flaherty (D), 65%
  - John Tabor (R), 35%
- 1973 Race for Pittsburgh Mayor
  - Pete Flaherty (D), 100%
  - Unopposed
- 1978 Race for Pennsylvania Governor
  - Dick Thornburgh (R), 52%
  - Pete Flaherty (D), 46%
- 1980 Race for U.S. Senate
  - Arlen Specter (R), 51%
  - Pete Flaherty (D), 48%

== See also ==
- List of mayors of Pittsburgh

== Sources ==
- Lorant, Stefan (1978). Pete: The Life of Peter F. Flaherty. Lenox: Authors Edition Inc. OCLC 4499424.
- Google News article on the Flaherty administration

Political offices
Preceded by Cyril Wecht	Member of the Allegheny County Board of Commissioners; 1984–1996	Succeeded by Michael Dawida
Preceded by Joe Barr	Mayor of Pittsburgh; 1970–1977	Succeeded by Richard Caliguiri
Legal offices
Preceded by Harold Tyler	U.S. Deputy Attorney General; Served under: Jimmy Carter; 1977–1978	Succeeded by Benjamin Civiletti
Party political offices
Preceded by Joe Clark	Democratic nominee for U.S. Senator from Pennsylvania (Class 3); 1974, 1980	Succeeded by Bob Edgar
Preceded by Milton Shapp	Democratic nominee for Governor of Pennsylvania; 1978	Succeeded by Allen Ertel
