= 2003 Allegheny County Executive election =

- November 4, 2003
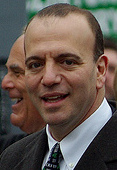

Nominee	Dan Onorato	Jim Roddey
Party	Democratic	Republican
Popular vote	200,201	146,914
Percentage	57.48%	42.18%
Allegheny County Executive before election
Jim Roddey
Republican
Elected Allegheny County Executive
Dan Onorato
Democratic

The 2003 Allegheny County Executive election was held on November 4, 2003. Incumbent Jim Roddey, the first elected County Executive, ran for re-election to a second term. He was challenged by County Controller Dan Onorato, the Democratic nominee. Onorato defeated Roddey by a wide margin, winning his first term as County Executive with 57 percent of the vote.

== Democratic primary ==
=== Candidates ===
- Dan Onorato, County Controller

==== Declined ====
- Jack Wagner, State Senator
- Cyril Wecht, County Coroner, 1999 Democratic nominee for County Executive

=== Primary results ===
Democratic primary results
Party	Candidate	Votes	%
Democratic	Dan Onorato	100,780	100.00%
Total votes		100,780	100.00%

== Republican primary ==
=== Candidates ===
- Jim Roddey, incumbent County Executive

=== Primary results ===
Republican primary results
Party	Candidate	Votes	%
Republican	Jim Roddey (inc.)	43,135	100.00%
Total votes		43,135	100.00%

== General election ==
=== Polling ===
Poll source	Date(s) administered	Sample size (Note: Key: A – all adults RV – registered voters LV – likely voters CV – certain voters V – unclear)	Margin of error	Dan Onorato (D)	Jim Roddey (R)	Other / Undecided
SurveyUSA	October 30 – November 1, 2003	566 (CV)	± 4.2%	54%	42%	4%

=== Results ===
2003 Allegheny County Executive election
Party	Candidate	Votes	%
Democratic	Dan Onorato	200,201	57.48%
Republican	Jim Roddey (inc.)	146,914	42.18%
Write-in		1,197	0.34%
Total votes		348,312	100.00%
Democratic gain from Republican			
