= Ravenstahl =

Ravenstahl is a surname. It may refer to:

- Adam Ravenstahl (born 1984), American politician, Democratic member of the Pennsylvania House of Representatives
- Luke Ravenstahl (born 1980), American politician, Mayor of Pittsburgh from 2006 until 2014
- Robert Ravenstahl, Sr. (1924–2015), American politician, Democratic member of the Pennsylvania House of Representatives
