= 2023 Allegheny County Executive election =

- November 7, 2023
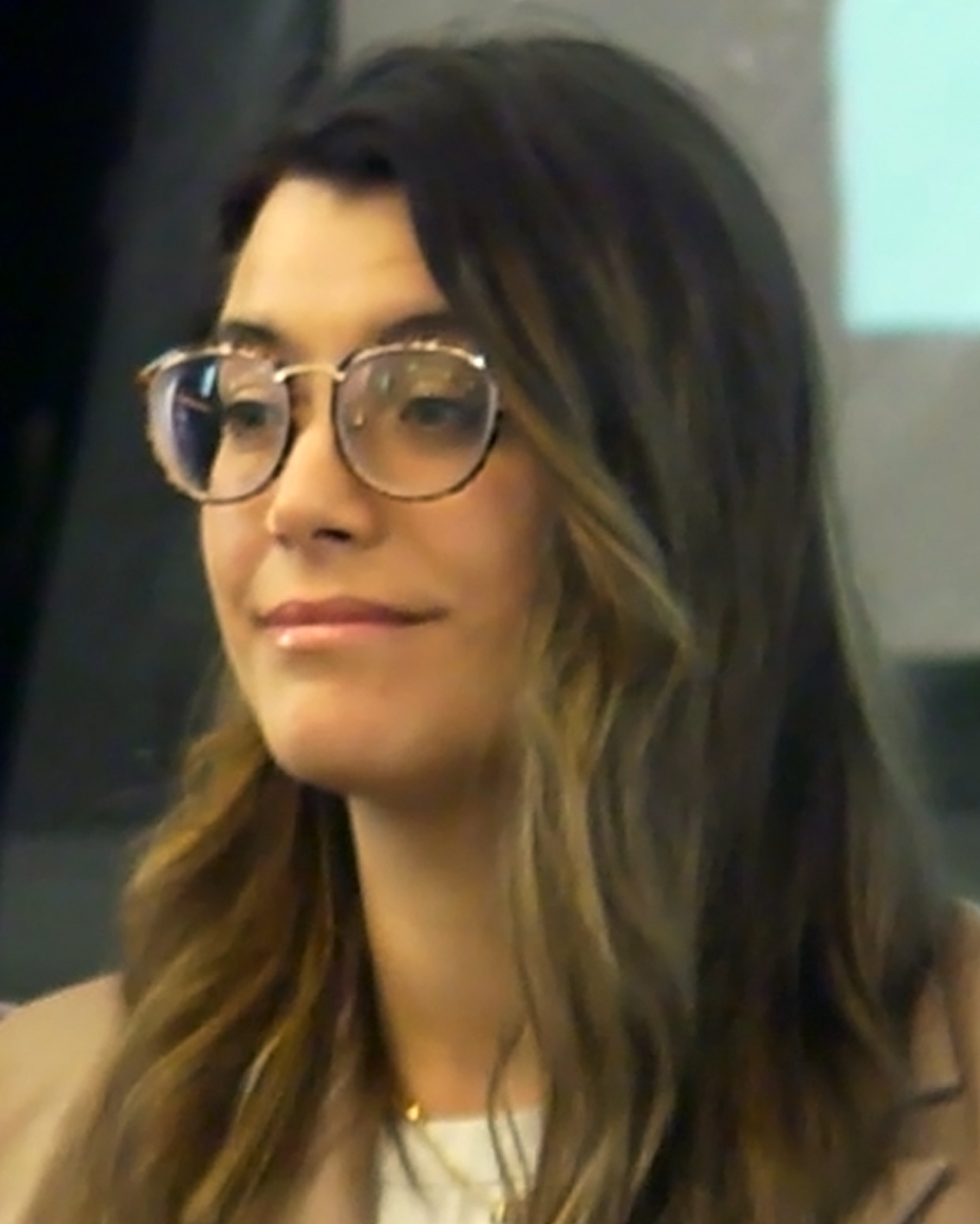

Nominee	Sara Innamorato	Joe Rockey
Party	Democratic	Republican
Popular vote	188,232	178,749
Percentage	51.2%	48.6%
- Innamorato: 50–60% 60–70% 70–80% 80–90% >90% Rockey: 40–50% 50–60% 60–70% 70–80% 80–90% Tie: 40–50% 50% No votes
County Executive before election
Rich Fitzgerald
Democratic
Elected County Executive
Sara Innamorato
Democratic

The 2023 Allegheny County Executive election was held on November 7, 2023, to elect the next chief executive of Allegheny County, Pennsylvania.

The incumbent county executive, Rich Fitzgerald, was ineligible to run for a fourth consecutive term due to term limits. The 2023 election was thus the first open seat race for county executive since Fitzgerald was elected in 2011, and the winner would become the fourth individual to hold the position of county executive since it was established under the home-rule charter in 2000, following Jim Roddey, Dan Onorato, and Fitzgerald.

The primary election was held on May 16. State Representative Sara Innamorato won the Democratic primary, while businessman Joe Rockey was unopposed in the Republican primary. Innamorato's nomination was seen as a major victory for the progressive movement in Allegheny County, continuing a trend that includes the election of Ed Gainey as mayor of Pittsburgh in 2021, and Summer Lee to the U.S. House in 2022. However, it was also an unexpectedly close result, with Innamorato's margin of 2.6% vastly underperforming Fitzgerald's 2019 margin of 36.5%.

== Democratic primary ==
=== Candidates ===
==== Nominee ====
- Sara Innamorato, former state representative from the 21st district (2019–2023)

==== Eliminated in primary ====
- Theresa Colaizzi, former Pittsburgh Public Schools board member
- Dave Fawcett, lawyer and former Republican at-large county councilor (1999–2007)
- Michael Lamb, Pittsburgh city controller, former Allegheny County prothonotary (2000–2008), candidate for mayor of Pittsburgh in 2005 and 2013, and candidate for Pennsylvania auditor general in 2020
- Will Parker, mobile app developer and candidate for Pennsylvania's 12th congressional district in 2022
- John Weinstein, Allegheny County treasurer

==== Withdrew ====
- Liv Bennett, county councilor from the 13th district (endorsed Weinstein)
- Erin McClelland, psychologist and nominee for Pennsylvania's 12th congressional district in 2014 and 2016 (endorsed Weinstein)

==== Declined ====
- Bethany Hallam, at-large county councilor (running for reelection)

=== Endorsements ===
Sara Innamorato

U.S. senators

- Bernie Sanders, U.S. senator from Vermont, Democratic candidate for president of the United States in 2016 and 2020 (Independent)

U.S. representatives

- Summer Lee, U.S. representative for Pennsylvania's 12th congressional district

Local officials

- Ed Gainey, mayor of Pittsburgh

Labor unions

- Pittsburgh Federation of Teachers
- SEIU Local 668
- Service Employees International Union
- United Electrical, Radio and Machine Workers of America Local 610 and 667

Organizations

- EMILY's List
- Friends of the Earth Action
- Our Revolution
- Sunrise Movement Pittsburgh
- Working Families Party
Michael Lamb

Local officials

- Rich Fitzgerald, incumbent Allegheny County executive
John Weinstein

State senators

- Jim Brewster, state senator from the 45th district
- Wayne Fontana, state senator from the 42nd district

State representatives

- Dan Deasy, state representative from the 27th district
- Anita Kulik, state representative from the 45th district

Local officials

- Liv Bennett, county councilor from the 13th district and candidate for Allegheny County executive in 2023
- Theresa Kail-Smith, president of the Pittsburgh City Council from the 2nd district
- Kevin Kraus, Allegheny County sheriff

Organizations

- AFL-CIO Allegheny-Fayette County Labor Council
- Allegheny County Democratic Committee
- United Mine Workers of America

=== Polling ===
Poll source	Date(s) administered	Sample size (Note: Key: A – all adults RV – registered voters LV – likely voters V – unclear)	Margin of error	Sara Innamorato	Michael Lamb	John Weinstein	Dave Fawcett	Other	Undecided
Public Opinion Strategies (Note: This poll was sponsored by Pittsburgh Works Together.)	Early May 2023	400 (LV)	± 4.9%	32%	20%	20%	8%	–	18%
Public Opinion Strategies	Early March 2023	459 (LV)	± 4.0%	17%	24%	28%	1%	2%	26%

=== Results ===
2023 Allegheny County executive election, Democratic primary
Party	Candidate	Votes	%
Democratic	Sara Innamorato	64,982	37.64%
Democratic	John Weinstein	50,935	29.51%
Democratic	Michael Lamb	34,147	19.78%
Democratic	Dave Fawcett	16,712	9.68%
Democratic	Theresa Colaizzi	3,663	2.12%
Democratic	Will Parker	1,961	1.14%
Write-in		228	0.13%
Total votes		172,628	100.0%

== Republican primary ==
=== Candidates ===
==== Nominee ====
- Joe Rockey, former PNC Financial Services executive

=== Results ===
2023 Allegheny County executive election, Republican primary
Party	Candidate	Votes	%
Republican	Joe Rockey	44,983	94.47%
Write-in		2,634	5.53%
Total votes		47,617	100.0%

== General election ==
=== Post-primary endorsements ===
Sara Innamorato (D)

U.S. senators

- Bob Casey Jr., U.S. senator from Pennsylvania
- John Fetterman, U.S. senator from Pennsylvania

State officials

- Josh Shapiro, governor of Pennsylvania

Local officials

- Dave Fawcett, former Republican at-large county councilor (1999–2007) and candidate for Allegheny County executive in 2023
- Rich Fitzgerald, incumbent Allegheny County executive
- Michael Lamb, Pittsburgh city controller, former Allegheny County prothonotary (2000–2008), and candidate for Allegheny County executive in 2023

Labor unions

- Amalgamated Transit Union Local 85
- American Federation of Teachers Local 2067 at CCAC
- Pennsylvania State Education Association
- Pittsburgh Starbucks Workers United
- SEIU 32BJ
- UFCW Local 1776
- UNITE HERE Local 57
- United Electrical, Radio and Machine Workers of America Eastern Region

Organizations

- Clean Water Action
- Conservation Voters of Pennsylvania

Newspapers

- New Pittsburgh Courier
Joe Rockey (R)

State officials

- Tom Corbett, 46th governor of Pennsylvania (2011–2015)

Labor unions

- Allegheny County Prison Employees Independent Union
- Fraternal Order of Police Lodge No. 1 and No. 91
- International Association of Heat and Frost Insulators and Allied Workers Local 2
- LiUNA! Local 1058 and 373 and the Pennsylvania District Council
- Plumbers Local 27
- Steamfitters Local 449

Individuals

- Theresa Colaizzi, candidate for Allegheny County executive in 2023
- Will Parker, candidate for Allegheny County executive in 2023
- Andrew Yang, entrepreneur, founder of Venture for America, Democratic candidate for president in 2020 and for mayor of New York City in 2021 (Independent)

Organizations

- Forward Party

Newspapers

- Pittsburgh Post-Gazette
Declined to endorse

Local officials

- John Weinstein, Allegheny County treasurer

=== Results ===
2023 Allegheny County executive election
Party	Candidate	Votes	%	±%
Democratic	Sara Innamorato	188,232	51.21%	−16.82%
Republican	Joe Rockey	178,749	48.63%	+17.11%
Write-in		569	0.15%	+0.30%
Total votes		367,550	100.0%	
Democratic hold				

== Notes ==
Partisan clients
