= Bruce Kraus =

American politician

Bruce A. Kraus

President of the Pittsburgh City Council
- In office January 6, 2014 – January 6, 2020
- Preceded by: Darlene Harris
- Succeeded by: Theresa Kail-Smith

Member of the Pittsburgh City Council from the 3rd district
- In office January 7, 2008 – January 1, 2024
- Preceded by: Jeff Koch
- Succeeded by: Bob Charland

Personal details
- Born: April 13, 1954 (age 72) South Side Flats, Pittsburgh, Pennsylvania
- Party: Democratic
- Website: pittsburghpa.gov/council/district3/kraus.html

Bruce A. Kraus (born April 13, 1954) is an American politician and businessman from Pittsburgh, Pennsylvania. He served on the Pittsburgh City Council from 2008 to 2024, representing the 3rd district. He was the president of the council from 2014 to 2020.

== Early life ==
Prior to becoming a Councilman, Kraus worked as an interior design consultant and also served as president of the South Side Chamber of Commerce. He was a member of Mayor Tom Murphy's Graffiti Task Force and Clean Pittsburgh Commission.

== Political career ==
Kraus first ran for the seat vacated by Gene Ricciardi, who resigned to become a district judge, in the 2006 special election. Though he was endorsed by the Pittsburgh Post-Gazette, his bid was unsuccessful. In 2007, he ran again against incumbent Jeff Koch and won the primary. Kraus, a Democrat, faced only a Libertarian opponent, Mark Rauterkus, who was running simultaneously for Pittsburgh City Controller. Kraus won and was sworn in on January 7, 2008, as part of a trio of new Council members (including Patrick Dowd and Ricky Burgess). He sought re-election in 2011, facing another Democratic primary against Jeff Koch, who had the support of Mayor Luke Ravenstahl. Kraus won 54% of the vote to Koch's 38%, with two other candidates each receiving 4%. No Republican or third-party candidate filed for the seat so Kraus ran unopposed in the general election in November 2011.

As a city councilman, Kraus drafted the city's first domestic partnership registry which passed in 2009. In 2014, he sponsored legislation to add gender identity and expression as an explicitly protected class with regard to housing, employment and public accommodation in the city.

Kraus authored legislation that banned the sale of force-fed animal products, including foie gras, in Pittsburgh. The ordinance was passed by the Pittsburgh City Council in 2023.

He has also been involved in trying to curb public drunkenness and overcrowding in South Side bars. In September 2009, City Council passed his ordinance banning public urination, creating the first such ban in Pittsburgh. He has authored ordinances increasing open-container fines and regulating the installation of sidewalk cafes. He introduced the Responsible Hospitality Institute's ("RHI") Sociable City Plan, which has worked to develop a comprehensive strategy to regulate the nighttime economy on Pittsburgh's South Side and elsewhere in the metropolitan area.

== Personal life ==
Kraus is the city's first openly gay elected official. He lives in Pittsburgh's South Side Flats neighborhood.
