= Walko =

Walko is a surname. Notable people with the surname include:

- Don Walko (born 1953), American politician
- Lajos Walko (1880–1954), Hungarian politician
