= 2007 Allegheny County Executive election =

- November 6, 2007
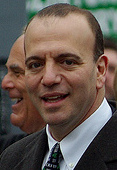
Nominee	Dan Onorato
Party	Democratic
Popular vote	217,531
Percentage	99.01%
Allegheny County Executive before election
Dan Onorato
Democratic
Elected Allegheny County Executive
Dan Onorato
Democratic

The 2007 Allegheny County Executive election was held on November 6, 2007. Incumbent Democratic County Executive Dan Onorato ran for re-election to a second term. Despite speculation that Onorato would run for Governor in 2010 and not complete his term, he faced only token opposition in the Democratic primary, and no other candidate filed to oppose him. Onorato won the Democratic primary in a landslide, and the Republican primary through write-in votes, enabling him to win his second term unopposed in the general election.

== Democratic primary ==
=== Candidates ===
- Dan Onorato, incumbent County Executive
- Richard P. Swartz, nonprofit executive

=== Primary results ===
Democratic primary results
Party	Candidate	Votes	%
Democratic	Dan Onorato (inc.)	121,066	86.65%
Democratic	Richard P. Swartz	18,469	13.22%
Democratic	Write-ins	176	0.13%
Total votes		139,711	100.00%

== Republican primary ==
No candidates filed for the Republican nomination, though Republican County Councilman Matt Drozd launched an informal write-in campaign for his son, also named Matt. At the same time, Onorato's campaign targeted likely Republican primary voters with a robocall the night before the election encouraging them to write in his name. Of the 3,431 write-in votes cast, Onorato received 1,844 of them, allowing him to win the Republican nomination, as well.

=== Primary results ===
Republican primary results
Party	Candidate	Votes	%
Republican	Dan Onorato (write-in)	1,844	53.75%
Republican	Other write-ins	1,587	46.25%
Total votes		3,431	100.00%

== General election ==
=== Results ===
2007 Allegheny County Executive election
Party	Candidate	Votes	%
Democratic	Dan Onorato (inc.)	217,531	99.01%
Write-in		2,166	0.99%
Total votes		219,697	100.00%
Democratic hold			
