= 2019 Allegheny County Executive election =

- November 5, 2019
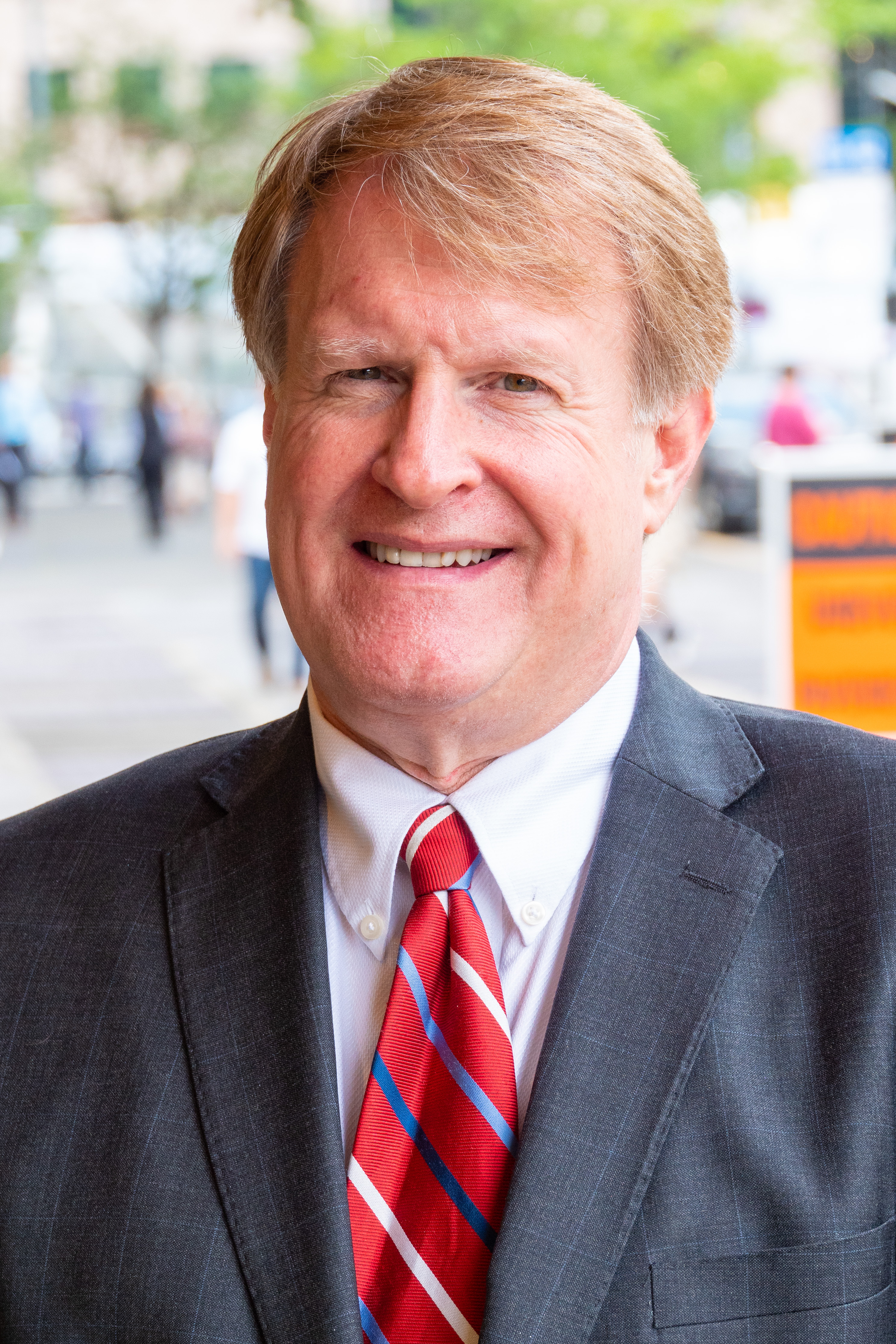

Nominee	Rich Fitzgerald	Matt Drozd
Party	Democratic	Republican
Popular vote	181,448	84,087
Percentage	68.03%	31.52%
County Executive before election
Rich Fitzgerald
Democratic
Elected County Executive
Rich Fitzgerald
Democratic

The 2019 Allegheny County Executive election was held on November 5, 2019. Incumbent Democratic County Executive Rich Fitzgerald ran for re-election to a third term. He faced no opposition in the primary and was opposed by former County Councilman Matt Drozd, the Republican nominee, in the general election. Fitzgerald defeated Drozd in a landslide, winning 68 percent of the vote to Drozd's 32 percent, winning his third and final term as County Executive.

== Democratic primary ==
=== Candidates ===
- Rich Fitzgerald, incumbent County Executive

=== Primary results ===
Democratic primary results
Party	Candidate	Votes	%
Democratic	Rich Fitzgerald (inc.)	97,484	98.21%
Democratic	Write-ins	1,779	1.79%
Total votes		99,263	100.00%

== Republican primary ==
=== Candidates ===
- Matt Drozd, former County Councilman

=== Primary results ===
Republican primary results
Party	Candidate	Votes	%
Republican	Matt Drozd	30,184	98.28%
Republican	Write-ins	528	1.72%
Total votes		30,712	100.00%

== General election ==
=== Results ===
2019 Allegheny County Executive election
Party	Candidate	Votes	%
Democratic	Rich Fitzgerald (inc.)	181,448	68.03%
Republican	Matt Drozd	84,087	31.52%
Write-in		1,197	0.45%
Total votes		266,732	100.00%
Democratic hold			
