= Lindsay Powell =

American politician

Member of the Pennsylvania House of Representatives from the 21st district
- Incumbent
- Assumed office October 2, 2023
- Preceded by: Sara Innamorato

Personal details
- Born: Brooklyn, New York, U.S.
- Party: Democratic
- Education: Wheaton College; Carnegie Mellon University
- Website: Campaign website State House website

Lindsay Powell is an American politician. A Democrat, she is a member of the Pennsylvania House of Representatives, representing the 21st district. She was elected in a 2023 special election to succeed Sara Innamorato, who resigned on July 19, 2023, to focus on her campaign for Allegheny County Executive.

== Early life and education ==
A Brooklyn native, Powell graduated with a Bachelor of Arts degree in sociology from Wheaton College. Later, she graduated with a Master of Science in public policy management from Carnegie Mellon University. Powell spent time teaching English in rural Malaysia after receiving the Fulbright Scholarship.

== Career ==
Powell has previously worked as an Assistant Chief of Staff for the City of Pittsburgh, focusing on city legislative priorities and department policy. Powell has also worked for Senator Chuck Schumer and Representative Hakeem Jeffries.

On July 19, 2023, then-incumbent Representative Sara Innamorato announced her resignation from the State House following her victory in the primary for Allegheny County Executive in May 2023. Later that month, the Allegheny County Democratic Committee selected Powell from a group of five candidates to be their nominee in the September special election to replace Innamorato. Powell defeated Republican Erin Connolly Autenreith with 65% of the vote. Powell was subsequently sworn in on October 2, 2023.

=== Committee assignments ===
- Aging & Older Adult Services
- Communications & Technology
- Housing & Community Development
- Transportation
- Tourism & Economic & Recreational Development

== Electoral history ==
Pennsylvania House special election, 2023 District 21
Party	Candidate	Votes	%
Democratic	Lindsay Powell	7,318	65.54
Republican	Erin Autenreith	3,848	34.46
Total votes		11,166	100.00
Democratic hold			
