= Andrew Fenrich =

American politician

Andrew T. Fenrich

Member of the Pennsylvania House of Representatives from the 20th district
- In office January 2, 1973 – November 30, 1974
- Preceded by: Michael Mullen
- Succeeded by: Michael Mullen

Member of the Pennsylvania House of Representatives from the 18th district
- In office January 7, 1969 – November 30, 1972
- Preceded by: District Created
- Succeeded by: Edward Burns

Member of the Pennsylvania House of Representatives from the Allegheny County district
- In office 1951–1968

Personal details
- Born: February 20, 1914 Pittsburgh, Pennsylvania
- Died: December 1, 1992 (aged 78) Pittsburgh, Pennsylvania
- Party: Democratic

Andrew T. Fenrich (February 20, 1914 – December 1, 1992) was a Democratic member of the Pennsylvania House of Representatives.

== Background ==
Born on February 20, 1914, in Allegheny County, Pennsylvania, Fenrich enlisted in the United States Navy during World War II, serving from 1943 to 1945, including aboard the USS Prince William from 1944 to 1945.

Elected president of the Paper Workers Union, American Federation of Labor, Fenrich worked as a salesman and later as a claims and lawsuit investigator, and also served as secretary to Pittsburgh mayor David Leo Lawrence, and as executive secretary and director of the Allegheny County Democratic Committee. Elected to the Pennsylvania House of Representatives in a special election on November 8, 1949, he was reelected in 1950 and 1952, but did not stand for reelection in 1954. Reelected to serve the 18th District in 1962, he served four additional consecutive terms, and was then reelected to serve the 20th District in 1972, but was not a candidate for reelection in 1974.

== Death and interment ==
Fenrich died in Pittsburgh on December 1, 1992.
