= Zober =

Zober is a surname. Notable people with the surname include:

- Hannelore Zober (born 1946), German handball player
- Rich Zober (born 1966), American racing driver
- Sandra Zober (1927–2011), American actor
- Yarone Zober (born 1975), politician
