= 1999 Allegheny County Executive election =

- November 2, 1999

Nominee	Jim Roddey	Cyril Wecht
Party	Republican	Democratic
Popular vote	178,312	172,084
Percentage	50.89%	49.11%
County Executive before election
Position established
Elected County Executive
Jim Roddey
Republican

The 1999 Allegheny County Executive election was held on November 2, 1999. The election was the first one following the 1998 passage of Allegheny County's charter, which replaced the existing County Commission with an elected County Executive and a fifteen-member County Council.

Both parties had contested primaries for the position. In the Democratic primary, County Coroner Cyril Wecht defeated County Commissioner Michael Dawida by a wide margin, winning the nomination with 57 percent of the vote. Businessman and civic activist Jim Roddey defeated County Commissioner Larry Dunn in a landslide, winning 68–32 percent. In the general election, Roddey narrowly defeated Wecht, 51–49 percent, becoming the first person to be elected County Executive, and, as of 2023, the only Republican to ever be elected to the position.

== Democratic primary ==
=== Candidates ===
- Cyril Wecht, County Coroner
- Michael Dawida, County Commissioner

=== Primary results ===
Democratic primary results
Party	Candidate	Votes	%
Democratic	Cyril Wecht	99,424	56.57%
Democratic	Michael Dawida	76,344	43.43%
Total votes		175,768	100.00%

== Republican primary ==
=== Candidates ===
- Jim Roddey, businessman and civic activist
- Larry Dunn, County Commissioner

=== Primary results ===
Republican primary results
Party	Candidate	Votes	%
Republican	Jim Roddey	49,361	68.03%
Republican	Larry Dunn	23,192	31.97%
Total votes		72,553	100.00%

== General election ==
=== Results ===
1999 Allegheny County Executive election
Party	Candidate	Votes	%
Republican	Jim Roddey	178,312	50.89%
Democratic	Cyril Wecht	172,084	49.11%
Total votes		350,396	100.00%
Republican win (new seat)			
