= Patrick Dowd =

American politician

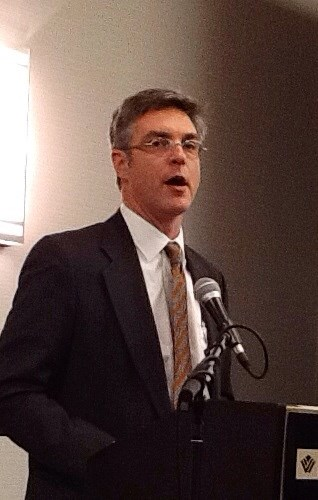
- Patrick Dowd speaks at a lectern at an event in 2013.

Member of the Pittsburgh City Council from the 7th District
- In office January 7, 2008 – July 10, 2013
- Preceded by: Leonard Bodack, Jr.
- Succeeded by: Deborah Gross

Member of the Pittsburgh Board of Education from the 1st District
- In office December 1, 2003 – December 3, 2007
- Preceded by: Darlene Harris
- Succeeded by: Heather Arnet

Personal details
- Party: Democratic
- Education: University of Missouri (BA); University of Pittsburgh (PhD)

Patrick Dowd (born 1968) is a Democratic Party politician in the United States. From 2008 until 2013, he served as a member of the Pittsburgh City Council from District 7, which includes the neighborhoods of Bloomfield, East Liberty, Friendship, Garfield, Highland Park, Lawrenceville, Morningside, Polish Hill, and Stanton Heights.

== Personal life and educational career ==
Dowd was raised in Chesterfield, Missouri and earned a B.A. from the University of Missouri. He moved to Pittsburgh in 1991 to study with Fritz Ringer in the department of history at the University of Pittsburgh, where he earned his Ph.D. in 1999. He has taught history first at Winchester Thurston School and then at The Ellis School. He is married to Leslie Hammond, who also graduated from the University of Pittsburgh before becoming a lecturer in the history department. They have six children and live in Highland Park.

== Political career ==
=== Pittsburgh Board of Education ===
In 2003, Dowd won a four-year term on the board after defeating incumbent board president and Democrat Darlene Harris in an upset.

As a candidate for school board, Dowd pledged to restore accountability to the system and in an intensely heated January 26, 2005 board meeting.

Dowd led a five-member coalition to removing Dr. John Thompson as the superintendent of the Pittsburgh Public Schools. The board launched a national search for a superintendent. The board hired Mark Roosevelt.

Dowd's departure from the board came in December 2007. His accountability contract and evaluation model remained in effect as did RISE, a program of teacher evaluation and PELA, a program for principals.

=== Pittsburgh City Council ===
Dowd was elected as the Democratic nominee to represent District 7 on the Pittsburgh City Council on May 15, 2007, and won the seat unopposed on November 6, 2007. (Primary elections are generally decisive in the heavily Democratic city of Pittsburgh.)

He began serving on January 7, 2008. Shortly after taking office, Dowd drafted and successfully encouraged his colleagues to sign a Proclamation to Improve Governance in Pittsburgh. Dowd also crafted and council passed a resolution calling for a task force on intergovernmental cooperation which led to the creation of CONNECT, a Pittsburgh-based development initiative to increase cooperation between Pittsburgh and its adjacent municipalities. In May, 2008, Dowd also started an innovative constituent outreach program called Council-to-Go which enables him to stay in regular contact with residents of his council district. Dowd consistently worked with Ravenstahl to bring increased focus on bike and pedestrian initiatives. In 2010 Dowd led a coalition that included Council President Harris, Councilwoman Rudiak and Controller Lamb and that offered a viable alternative to Ravenstahl's proposed 50-year lease of all public parking assets in the Pittsburgh. In the fall of 2011 the state accepted this plan.

As a member of the board of the Pittsburgh Water and Sewer Authority, Dowd made customer service and infrastructure reinvestment top priorities. In 2009, PWSA launched a controversial water and sewer line insurance program that has successfully provided coverage to nearly 100,000 customers That same year, Dowd was instrumental in the creation of the Distribution Infrastructure System Reinvestment Fund, which added 5% charge to customers bills and dedicated that revenue solely to infrastructure reinvestment. In 2010, Dowd supported the PWSA administration in bid to reinvest in its antiquated information system. Dowd also led the effort to bring an outside management firm in on an interim basis to overhaul the management of the authority. Veolia of North America began their innovative contractual relationship with PWSA in July, 2012. They are scheduled to be in Pittsburgh until December, 2014.

In 2011 Dowd and Judge Frank Lucchino led a voter initiative to create a new library tax in Pittsburgh. The ballot initiative called for the creation of a 0.25 mills property tax dedicated to the Carnegie Library and received the backing of 72% of Pittsburgh voters.

Dowd announced in June 2013 that he would resign his seat on city council effective in mid-July to become the inaugural executive director of Allies for Children, a start-up advocacy nonprofit focused on children. A special election to fill his seat was held with the regularly scheduled municipal election in November 2013. The seat on city council was won by Deborah Gross, the endorsed Democrat in the race.

Dowd also served as a member of the board of the Carnegie Library of Pittsburgh,

=== Mayoral campaign ===
Dowd announced on February 19, 2009, that he would challenge mayor Luke Ravenstahl in Pittsburgh's May 19 Democratic primary. In his announcement, Dowd criticized what he saw as Ravenstahl's failures on campaign finance reform in light of the mayor's veto of a campaign finance reform bill in the summer of 2008, a risky bond deal at the Pittsburgh Water and Sewer Authority, wasteful spending and the Lamar LED controversy. Dowd was endorsed by the Stonewall Democrats and the Pittsburgh Post-Gazette, among others, but lost in a three-way race to Ravenstahl by 31 points, receiving 28 percent of the vote.

== Allies for Children ==
Dowd led Allies for Children from its formation in 2013 until February 2021. The organization serves as a bold voice for policy changes that improve the lives of children in Allegheny County. Allies for Children works in coalition with many nonprofits bringing together the voices of those they serve to elevate the important policy issues and move policy makers to act in the best interest of children. In 2018, Allies for Children led a large coalition and a referendum campaign to increase access for early childhood education and after school programs.

== Allegheny County Children's Fund Initiative ==
In 2018, as executive director of Allies for Children, Dowd led Our kids. Our Commitment. The Allegheny County Children's Fund initiative. The goal of the initiative was to improve access across Allegheny Count to early childhood learning, afterschool programs and nutritious meals. In May, a coalition of ten nonprofits, supported by dozens of others, announced their intention to launch a petition effort to place a question on the Allegheny County November General Election ballot. Between June and August, the coalition gathered nearly 64,000 and successfully placed their question on the ballot. The question, which was accompanied by an amendment to the Allegheny County Home Rule Charter, read as follows: “Shall the Allegheny County Home Rule Charter be amended to establish the Allegheny County Children’s Fund, funded by Allegheny County levying and collecting an additional 0.25 mills, the equivalent of $25 on each $100,000 of assessed value, on all taxable real estate, beginning January 1, 2019 and thereafter, to be used to improve the well-being of children through the provision of services throughout the County including early childhood learning, after school programs, and nutritious meals?" On November 6, 2018, more than 518,206 votes were cast: YES = 251,010 NO = 267,196.
