= William Quest =

American politician

William J. Quest

Member of the Pennsylvania House of Representatives from the 20th district
- In office June 5, 1978 – November 30, 1978
- Preceded by: Michael Mullen
- Succeeded by: Stephen Grabowski

Personal details
- Born: July 20, 1926
- Died: February 23, 1991 (aged 64)
- Party: Democratic

William J. Quest (July 20, 1926 – February 23, 1991) was a Democratic member of the Pennsylvania House of Representatives. He was first elected on June 5, 1978.
