= Adam Ravenstahl =

American politician

Member of the Pennsylvania House of Representatives from the 20th district
- In office June 9, 2010 – December 1, 2020
- Preceded by: Don Walko
- Succeeded by: Emily Kinkead

Personal details
- Born: November 9, 1984 (age 41) Pittsburgh, Pennsylvania
- Party: Democratic
- Education: Robert Morris University
- Occupation: Legislator

Adam Ravenstahl (born November 9, 1984) is a former Democratic member of the Pennsylvania House of Representatives for the 20th District which includes the North Side, Strip District, Polish Hill, Stanton Heights, and Lawrenceville neighborhoods of the city of Pittsburgh, as well as parts of the suburbs of Reserve Township, Ross Township and West View.

Ravenstahl graduated from North Catholic High School in Pittsburgh, and then graduated from Robert Morris University with a degree in Business Management. After graduation, he was employed as a Business Analyst for UPMC Health Plan, while participating in numerous community activities, and served as a Democratic Committee Member.

He is a member of a prominent political family in Pittsburgh. He held the state house seat that was once held by his grandfather, Robert Ravenstahl. His elder brother is former Pittsburgh Mayor Luke Ravenstahl while his father, Robert Jr., is Magisterial District Judge of the city's 26th and 27th Wards.

Ravenstahl won a special election May 18, 2010 to become the state representative for the 20th District. In the June 2, 2020 Democratic primary election, Ravenstahl was defeated by attorney Emily Kinkead, receiving 45.2% of the vote.
