= Paul W. Miller =

American politician

Member of the Pennsylvania House of Representatives from the 20th district
- In office January 7, 1969 – November 30, 1970
- Preceded by: District created
- Succeeded by: Michael M. Mullen

Member of the Pennsylvania House of Representatives from the Allegheny County district
- In office January 2, 1967 – November 30, 1968

Personal details
- Born: August 10, 1899 Pittsburgh, Pennsylvania
- Died: August 6, 1976 (aged 76) Pittsburgh, Pennsylvania
- Party: Democratic

Paul W. Miller (August 10, 1899 – August 6, 1976) was a Democratic member of the Pennsylvania House of Representatives.
