= Jack Wagner (politician) =

American politician

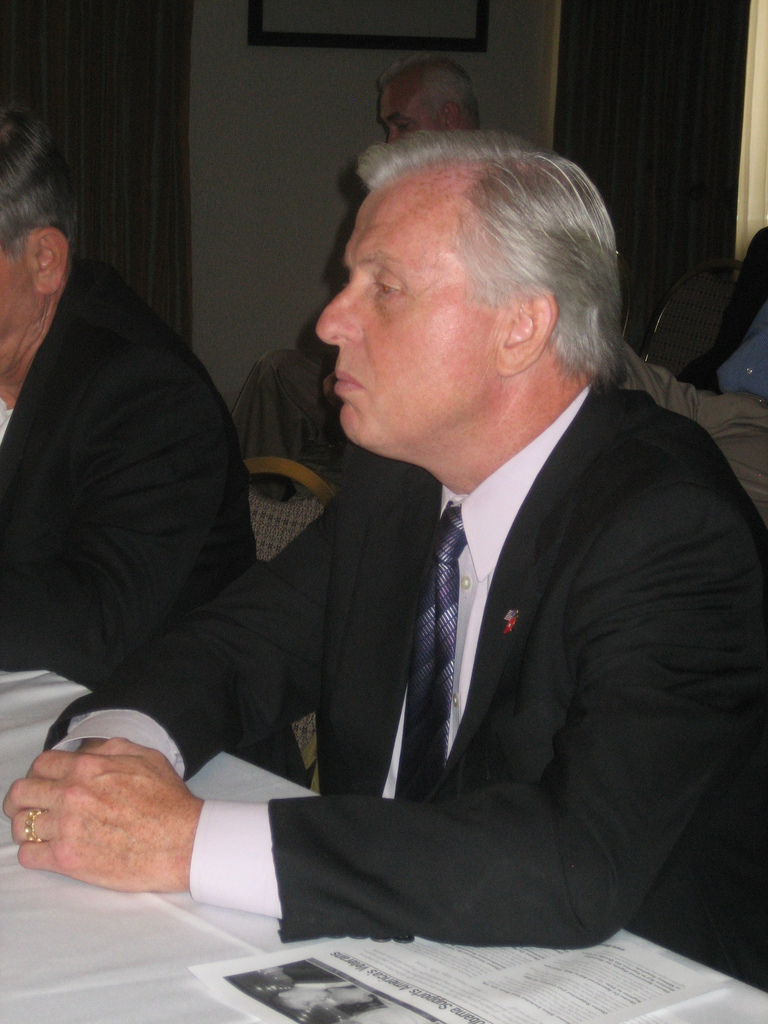

48th Auditor General of Pennsylvania
- In office January 18, 2005 – January 15, 2013
- Governor: Ed Rendell; Tom Corbett
- Preceded by: Bob Casey Jr.
- Succeeded by: Eugene DePasquale

Member of the Pennsylvania Senate from the 42nd district
- In office May 24, 1994 – January 18, 2005
- Preceded by: Eugene Scanlon
- Succeeded by: Wayne Fontana

President of the Pittsburgh City Council
- In office November 6, 1989 – January 3, 1994; Acting: November 6, 1989 – January 1, 1990
- Preceded by: Ben Woods (Acting)
- Succeeded by: Jim Ferlo

Member of the Pittsburgh City Council from the 4th district
- In office January 2, 1984 – January 3, 1994
- Preceded by: Thomas Flaherty
- Succeeded by: Joe Cusick

Personal details
- Born: January 4, 1948 (age 78) Pittsburgh, Pennsylvania, U.S.
- Party: Democratic
- Spouse: Nancy Wagner
- Children: 2
- Education: Indiana University of Pennsylvania

Military service
- Branch/service: United States Marine Corps
- Years of service: 1966–1968
- Battles/wars: Vietnam War

Jack E. Wagner (born January 4, 1948) is an American Democratic politician from the Commonwealth of Pennsylvania. He served as Pennsylvania Auditor General, and previously served in the State Senate and Pittsburgh City Council.

== Early life, education, and military service ==
Wagner is a veteran of the United States Marine Corps and a recipient of the Purple Heart and other military commendations for service in the Vietnam War from 1966 to 1968. "In the demilitarized zone between North and South Vietnam, Wagner's squad got caught in an ambush." Wagner was among three wounded, twelve others died. After being discharged from the Marines, he attended Indiana University of Pennsylvania (IUP) where he graduated in 1974 with a degree in Safety Management. While a student at IUP, Wagner worked as a paramedic with Citizens Ambulance Service serving Indiana County and taught evening emergency responder courses at Admiral Peary Area Vocational Technical School in Ebensburg. Wagner received IUP's Distinguished Alumni Award for service to the community and the university in 1994.

Wagner was running a restaurant in 1980 when his community experienced serious water problems. He organized a community meeting which no public officials attended, prompting him to make the decision to seek political office that evening.

== Pittsburgh City Council ==
=== Elections ===
He originally sought a seat on the Pittsburgh City Council in 1981, but was unsuccessful. In 1983, he again ran for city council, and this time he was successful, winning election to the at-large seat being vacated by Tom Flaherty, who was elected City Controller. Wagner was originally elected to Flaherty's at-large seat, but won re-election after a voter-approved referendum divided city council seats into districts. Wagner won re-election to the at-large seat in 1987, and again in 1989, in a divisive election triggered by the reorganization of city council seats into numbered districts.

=== Leadership positions ===
In May 1988, Mayor Richard Caliguiri died, and Council President Sophie Masloff ascended to the office of mayor. The council's president pro tempore, Ben Woods, declared himself acting council president. Woods served as acting president from the date of Masloff's swearing-in on May 6, 1988, until he resigned on November 6, 1989, after being indicted on charges of racketeering and extortion. Wagner ascended to the office of Acting Council President following Wood's resignation, and remained in the position until he was formally elected council president the following January.

=== 1993 Pittsburgh mayoral election ===
Pittsburgh Mayor Sophie Masloff decided not to seek re-election to a second term. Wagner and four other Democrats ran. State Representative Tom Murphy won the Democratic primary with 72% of the vote. Wagner was a distant second place with 28% of the vote.

== Pennsylvania Senate ==
=== Elections ===
Wagner did not seek re-election to city council in 1993, and originally sought instead to run for mayor. In 1994, however, he instead decided to run in the special election triggered by the death of Democratic State Senator Eugene Scanlon. In March, Wagner won the state party endorsement by winning 58% of the vote from the State Democratic Committee. Dan Onorato placed second with 40% of the vote. In May, Wagner won the Democratic primary with a plurality of 46% of the vote, beating Onorato by six points. In November, he won the general election unopposed.

In 1998, he won re-election to a second term unopposed. In 2002, he won re-election to a third term with 72% of the vote.

=== Tenure ===
He was chairman of the Democratic Caucus.

=== Committee assignments ===
- Appropriations
- Banking and Insurance (Chair)
- Policy
- Rules and Executive Nominations
- Veterans Affairs and Emergency Preparedness

== 2002 gubernatorial election ==
Wagner ran for Lieutenant Governor of Pennsylvania in the 2002 Democratic primary on a ticket with then-auditor general Bob Casey Jr. Eight other candidates decided to run in the Democratic primary. Despite Democratic State Committee endorsement, he lost to former state treasurer Catherine Baker Knoll, 25–22 percent. She became the running mate of the party's gubernatorial nominee, former Philadelphia mayor Ed Rendell.

== Auditor general ==
Seal of Jack Wagner as Auditor General

=== Elections ===
2004

In 2004, Wagner ran to succeed Casey as Auditor General. He won the Democratic primary unopposed. In November, he defeated Republican Joe Peters 52–45 percent.

2008

Wagner won re-election by defeating Republican businessman Chet Beiler 59–38 percent. Wagner outpolled Beiler 59–38 percent. He earned the most votes of any candidate in Pennsylvania (3.26 million), including Presidential candidate Barack Obama.

=== Tenure ===
Wagner became Pennsylvania's 48th elected auditor general on January 18, 2005. He was responsible for auditing school districts, executive agencies, and state commissions to ensure fiscal responsibility. The legislature is exempt from the auditor general's purview. The auditor general also serves as an ex officio commissioner of the Delaware River Port Authority.

== 2010 gubernatorial election ==
On July 20, 2009, Wagner announced his candidacy for governor, becoming the first Democrat to publicly declare his candidacy for the office. Wagner had been considered a potential candidate for the Democratic nomination for U.S. Senate from Pennsylvania in 2010, prior to his gubernatorial announcement.

Despite earning the endorsement of the Philadelphia Inquirer, the state's largest newspaper, Wagner finished second in the four person Democratic primary field. Allegheny County Chief Executive Dan Onorato defeated Wagner 45–24 percent. Onorato won Allegheny County, home to both candidates, with 79 percent of the vote. Wagner won only three counties in the state.

== 2013 Pittsburgh mayoral election ==
After incumbent mayor Luke Ravenstahl decided not to run for re-election, Wagner decided to run again for mayor in March 2013. On March 28, Wagner picked up the endorsements from four labor unions, representing about 60% of the city's 3,000 workers, including its police officers and firefighters. In the end, however, he was defeated in the May 21, 2013, Democratic primary election by City Councilman Bill Peduto.

== Personal life and family ==
Wagner is married to Nancy. The couple has two children: Luke and Sara. His niece, Chelsa, was the Allegheny County Controller, and a former member of the Pennsylvania House of Representatives from the 22nd District. She currently serves as a judge on the Allegheny County Court of Common Pleas. Jack Wagner is a Roman Catholic.

== See also ==
- 2002 Pennsylvania lieutenant gubernatorial election
- 2010 Pennsylvania gubernatorial election

Pittsburgh City Council
Preceded by Thomas Flaherty	Member of the Pittsburgh City Council from the 4th district 1984–1994	Succeeded by Joe Cusick
Preceded by Ben Woods; Acting	President of the Pittsburgh City Council; 1989–1994	Succeeded by Jim Ferlo
Pennsylvania State Senate
Preceded by Eugene Scanlon	Member of the Pennsylvania Senate from the 42nd district 1994–2005	Succeeded by Wayne Fontana
Party political offices
Preceded by Bob Casey	Democratic nominee for Auditor General of Pennsylvania; 2004, 2008	Succeeded by Eugene DePasquale
Political offices
Preceded by Bob Casey	Auditor General of Pennsylvania; 2005–2013	Succeeded by Eugene DePasquale
