= Barbara Burns (Pennsylvania politician) =

American politician

Barbara A. Burns

Member of the Pennsylvania House of Representatives from the 20th district
- In office March 7, 1994 – November 30, 1994
- Preceded by: Thomas Murphy
- Succeeded by: Don Walko

Member of the Pittsburgh City Council from the 1st District
- In office January 4, 2000 – January 5, 2004
- Preceded by: Dan Onorato
- Succeeded by: Luke Ravenstahl

Personal details
- Party: Democratic

Barbara A. Burns is a former Democratic member of the Pennsylvania House of Representatives and of Pittsburgh City Council.

== Political career ==
Burns was first elected to the State House on March 7, 1994 to fill the vacancy left by Thomas Murphy's election as Mayor of Pittsburgh She was defeated for re-election in the primary by Don Walko. In 1999, she successfully sought a seat on the Pittsburgh City Council from the first district, which was being vacated by Democrat Dan Onorato. She was defeated for re-election by Democrat Luke Ravenstahl in 2004.
