= Sara Innamorato =

American politician (born 1986)

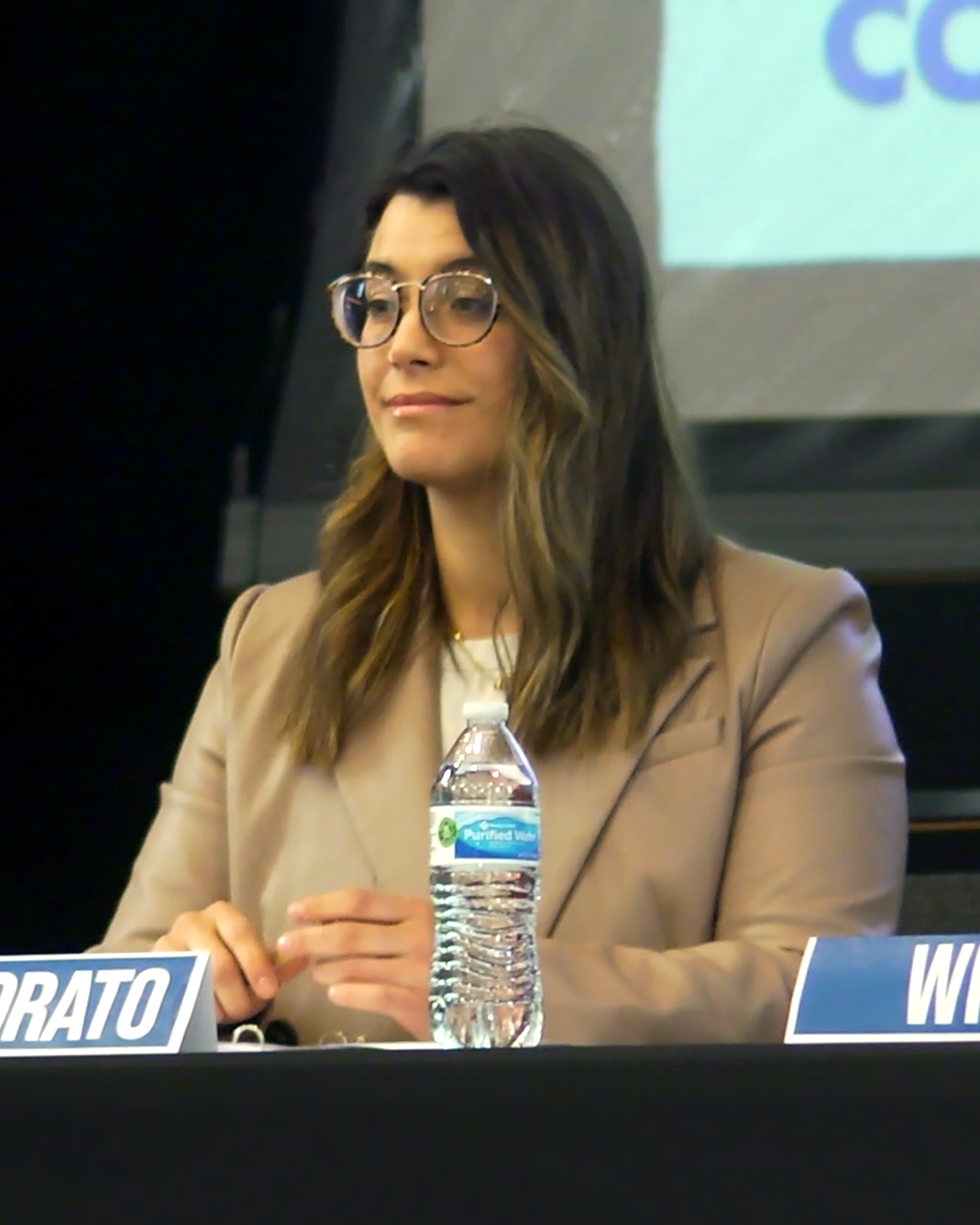
- Innamorato in 2023

Executive of Allegheny County
- Incumbent
- Assumed office January 2, 2024
- Preceded by: Rich Fitzgerald

Member of the Pennsylvania House of Representatives from the 21st district
- In office January 1, 2019 – July 19, 2023
- Preceded by: Dom Costa
- Succeeded by: Lindsay Powell

Personal details
- Born: April 24, 1986 (age 40)
- Party: Democratic
- Education: University of Pittsburgh (BS)
- Website: Campaign website

Sara G. Innamorato is an American politician serving as the county executive of Allegheny County, Pennsylvania since 2024. She was a member of the Pennsylvania House of Representatives for the 21st district from 2019 to 2023.

== Early life and education ==
Innamorato was raised in Ross Township and attended the North Hills School District. She graduated magna cum laude from the University of Pittsburgh with a Bachelor of Science in business.

== Early career ==
After the 2008 economic crash, she secured a spot in a leadership program at Apple. She then left the private sector to work in the nonprofit sector, focusing on issues of vacant land reclamation, food justice, and digital equity. She started Innamo Co., an independent marketing firm focused on "social good". Innamorato is a co-founder of She Runs SWPA, a non-partisan organization focused on encouraging women to run for office.

== Political career ==
=== 2018 election ===
Then a member of the Democratic Socialists of America (DSA), she won the Democratic Party nomination for the seat by defeating incumbent Dom Costa in the 2018 primary election with over 64% of the vote.

Although Innamorato was unopposed on the ballot, Costa launched a write-in campaign late in the election cycle. Costa went public with the bid following a podcast interview in which Innamorato was quoted saying, "My district, which I know is like white working class, poor folk, who are racist, because it's so much easier for them to look to their side and say, 'I'm going to blame that person.'" Costa campaign head Gary Britcher argued that Innamorato had called the district "racist".

Innamorato responded in an interview, stating that the comment had been taken out of context: "'From the beginning of this campaign, I've talked about my experience growing up in that district, and about the kindness of neighborhood (sic) who helped me through the instability of growing up.' Her point, she said, was that white working class voters 'are being exploited from all sides,' by economic and political elites who play on racial tensions to distract them from issues of economic injustice. 'Racism exists everywhere,' she said. 'My job is to represent everyone, and to not shy away from tough conversations.'"

Innamorato won the general election with 19,985 votes (85%), with Costa and other write-in candidates receiving 3,584 votes (15%). After the election, allegations surfaced that two violations of Pennsylvania campaign finance law were committed by the PAC "Americans Against Socialism," the principal funding mechanism for the marketing firm employed by the Costa write-in campaign.

Innamorato's affiliation with the Democratic Socialists of America ended in 2019.

=== 2020 election ===
In 2020, Innamorato was initially opposed by Stephen Zappala III, the son of the Allegheny County District Attorney, for the Democratic Party nomination. Zappala quietly withdrew his candidacy the following month. As a result, Innamorato was unopposed on the ballot for the Democratic Party nomination.

Innamorato defeated Republican challenger John Waugh in the general election.

=== 2023 election ===
In December 2022, Innamorato launched her campaign to become the first female County Executive of Allegheny County. Innamorato won her primary and faced Republican Joseph Rockey in the November general election. She announced her resignation from the Pennsylvania House of Representatives on Wednesday, July 19, 2023. She made the decision in order to dedicate more time to her campaign for the role of Allegheny County executive.

Her departure from office resulted in a tie between Democrats and Republicans in the Pennsylvania House of Representatives, now both with 101 seats. A special election to replace Innamorato took place on September 19, 2023. Democrat Lindsay Powell defeated Republican Erin Connolly Autenreith with over 65% of the vote.

Innamorato was elected in 2023. She is the first woman to hold the position.

=== Committee assignments ===
- Finance
- Labor & Industry
- Transportation
- Urban Affairs

== Political positions ==
=== Electoral reform ===
Innamorato is the prime sponsor of HB 1556, a bill designed to expand automatic voter registration services to all individuals who utilize state government and legislative services. The bill was developed as part of a suite of electoral reform bills advanced by the House Democratic Caucus.

=== Environment ===
Innamorato opposes hydraulic fracturing, citing many public health concerns in communities near drilling sites and refineries. She has voted against legislation to grant tax exemptions and incentives to new petrochemical plants, labeling such proposals "corporate welfare". However, Innamorato has also organized public hearings to encourage dialogue between labor unions and anti-fracking organizations, saying she believes the choice between "the environment" and "good union jobs, family sustaining jobs" is "false and ... antiquated." Innamorato has stated that she has worked to draft legislation to prevent the dumping of chemicals and waste water used in hydraulic fracturing into sewage treatments plants and public waterways, due to alleged radioactive contamination.

Innamorato has spoken in favor of Green New Deal legislation, as well as green and sustainable infrastructure development.

=== Housing ===
Innamorato has spoken in favor of Inclusionary Zoning and Affordable Housing initiatives. During the COVID-19 pandemic, Innamorato joined with other lawmakers in calling for a moratorium on evictions. She was the author of legislation that called for statewide rent and mortgage freezes for the duration of the COVID-19 response and economic recovery.

=== Public health ===
Innamorato has spoken publicly in favor of instituting a Medicare-for-All type universal health insurance program for Pennsylvania.

She authored legislation creating a free and universal "Baby Box" program for expectant mothers in Pennsylvania. The program aims to reduce infant mortality and provide essential maternity and childcare items.

Innamorato sponsored legislation intending to end the practice that allowed medical students in Pennsylvania to perform pelvic examinations on unconscious women without their consent.

Innamorato has spoken publicly about struggles with opioid abuse and death from overdose within her own family. She favors what she terms "harm reduction strategies" to combat the epidemic; including policies such as decriminalization and rehabilitation for drug users.

=== Public transit ===
Innamorato supports improving and expanding public transportation and transit access in her district. She has also stated that she thinks Pennsylvania should "focus on systems that are publicly held that are going to move the most people in the most efficient way possible."

She supported legislation to change the Pennsylvania code, allowing for Parking Protected bike lanes.

=== Social services ===
Innamorato supports increasing funding and the availability of social services and programs in Pennsylvania. She provided testimony at a public hearing, in opposition to legislation that would end the Pennsylvania General Assistance Program.

=== Taxation ===
Innamorato advocates for a policy called the "Fair Share Tax Plan". The proposal advocates for several policy initiatives to restructure Pennsylvania's tax system.

Innamorato supported legislation giving Second Class cities in Pennsylvania the legal authority to freeze property taxes for long-time and elderly residents.

=== 2020 presidential election ===
Innamorato publicly endorsed Bernie Sanders for the 2020 Democratic Party Presidential nomination.

Following the suspension of the Sanders campaign, Innamorato signed on to a joint statement calling on Joe Biden to embrace parts of Sanders' campaign platform. Innamorato expressed concerns about Biden's conduct following allegations against him of sexual assault.

=== Israel-Palestine Conflict ===
She condemned the DSA for their statement describing the 2023 Hamas-led attack on Israel as "inevitable" due to "the conditions imposed by Israeli occupation". She countered the sentiment, emphasizing Israel's right to self defense and affirmed her solidarity with the Jewish people as well as the direct victims of the attack.

Innamorato issued a joint statement on October 7, 2024 with Congresswoman Summer Lee and Pittsburgh Mayor Ed Gainey which condemned both Hamas and the Israeli military for the organizations' targeting of civilians. Rabbi Yitzi Genack called the statement "tone deaf" given the "false equivalence between Jews defending themselves and attacks and murders and rapes and burnings of Jewish people".

== Electoral history ==
2018 PA House District 21, Democratic primary
Party	Candidate	Votes	%
Democratic	Sara Innamorato	5,912	64.07
Democratic	Dom Costa	3,304	35.81
	Write-in votes	11	0.12
Total votes		9,227	100

2018 PA House District 21, general election
Party	Candidate	Votes	%
Democratic	Sara Innamorato	19,985	84.79
	Write-in votes	3,584	15.21
Total votes		23,569	100

2020 PA House District 21, Democratic primary
Party	Candidate	Votes	%
Democratic	Sara Innamorato	12,308	98.28
	Write-in votes	215	1.72
Total votes		12,523	100

2020 PA House District 21, general election
Party	Candidate	Votes	%
Democratic	Sara Innamorato	24,035	66.24
Republican	John Waugh	12,170	33.54
	Write-in votes	79	0.22
Total votes		36,284	100

2022 PA House District 21, Democratic primary
Party	Candidate	Votes	%
Democratic	Sara Innamorato	10,422	99.16
	Write-in votes	88	0.84
Total votes		10,510	100.00

2022 PA House District 21, general election
Party	Candidate	Votes	%
Democratic	Sara Innamorato	20,255	63.47
Republican	Frank Perman	11,601	36.35
	Write-in votes	58	0.18
Total votes		31,914	100.00

2023 Allegheny County Executive, Democratic primary
Party	Candidate	Votes	%
Democratic	Sara Innamorato	64,982	37.64
Democratic	John K. Weinstein	50,935	29.51
Democratic	Michael E. Lamb	34,147	19.78
Democratic	Dave Fawcett	16,712	9.68
Democratic	Theresa Sciulli Colaizzi	3,663	2.12
Democratic	William Parker	1,961	1.14
	Write-in votes	228	
Total votes		172,628	100.00

2023 Allegheny County Executive, general election
Party	Candidate	Votes	%
Democratic	Sara Innamorato	188,232	51.21
Republican	Joseph E. Rockey	178,749	48.63
	Write-in votes	569	0.15
Total votes		367,550	100.00

== See also ==
- List of Democratic Socialists of America who have held office in the United States

Political offices
Preceded by Rich Fitzgerald	Executive of Allegheny County; 2024–present	Incumbent
