= Leonard Sweeney =

American politician (1943–2018)

Leonard E. Sweeney

Member of the Pennsylvania House of Representatives from the 17th district
- In office January 7, 1975 – August 27, 1975
- Preceded by: Eugene Scanlon
- Succeeded by: Robert Ravenstahl

Personal details
- Born: Leonard Eugene Sweeney; July 5, 1943 Pittsburgh, Pennsylvania, U.S.
- Died: December 26, 2018 (aged 75) Pittsburgh, Pennsylvania, U.S.
- Party: Democratic
- Spouse: Elizabeth North
- Children: 8
- Education: Duquesne University
- Occupation: Attorney, Entrepreneur, Chief Compliance Officer

Leonard Eugene Sweeney (July 5, 1943 – November 26, 2018) was a former Democratic member of the Pennsylvania House of Representatives.

Sweeney was accused of filing false insurance claims, charged with fraud, convicted and sentenced to at least six months in jail and fined $3,000. Since no Pennsylvania Representative may serve when convicted, he was asked to step down from the seat to which he was newly elected. When he refused, the House voted 176–1 to remove him immediately. Sweeney appealed the ruling and lost.
