= Michael M. Mullen =

American politician

Member of the Pennsylvania House of Representatives from the 20th district
- In office January 7, 1975 – February 19, 1978
- Preceded by: Andrew Fenrich
- Succeeded by: William Quest
- In office January 5, 1971 – November 30, 1972
- Preceded by: Paul Miller
- Succeeded by: Andrew Fenrich

Personal details
- Born: August 21, 1918 Pittsburgh, Pennsylvania
- Died: February 19, 1978 (aged 59) Pittsburgh, Pennsylvania
- Party: Democratic
- Spouse: Katherine Patricia McCarthy
- Children: Michael M Jr. (1948), Patric (1957)

Michael M. Mullen (August 21, 1918 – February 19, 1978) is a former Democratic member of the Pennsylvania House of Representatives.
