= Pittsburgh Mayoral Chief of Staff =

The Pittsburgh Mayoral Chief of Staff is the senior advisor, strategic planner and "gatekeeper" to the Mayor of Pittsburgh of Pittsburgh, Pennsylvania.

- Dan Gilman 2026-Present (serving Corey O'Connor)
- Jake Wheatley 2022-2026 (serving Ed Gainey)
- Dan Gilman 2018–2022 (serving Bill Peduto)
- Kevin Acklin 2014-2018 (serving Bill Peduto)
- Yarone Zober 2006-2014 (serving Luke Ravenstahl)
- Dick Skrinjar 2006 (serving Bob O'Connor)
- Sal Sirabella 1994-2003 (serving Thomas J. Murphy
- Tom Cox 1994-2006 (serving Thomas J. Murphy, Jr.)
- George Whitmer ?-1994 (serving Sophie Masloff)
- Joe Mistick 1989-? (serving Sophie Masloff)
- George Jacoby 1986-1989 (serving Richard Caliguiri & Sophie Masloff)
- David Donahoe 1985-1986 (serving Richard Caliguiri)
- David Matter 1977-1985 (serving Richard Caliguiri)
- Bruce Campbell 1970-1977 (serving Peter F. Flaherty)
- Burrell Cohen ?-November 27, 1968 (serving Joseph M. Barr)
- David Kurtzman ?-1959 (serving David L. Lawrence)
- John P. Robin ?-1955 (serving Con Scully & David Lawrence)
