= Emily Kinkead =

American politician

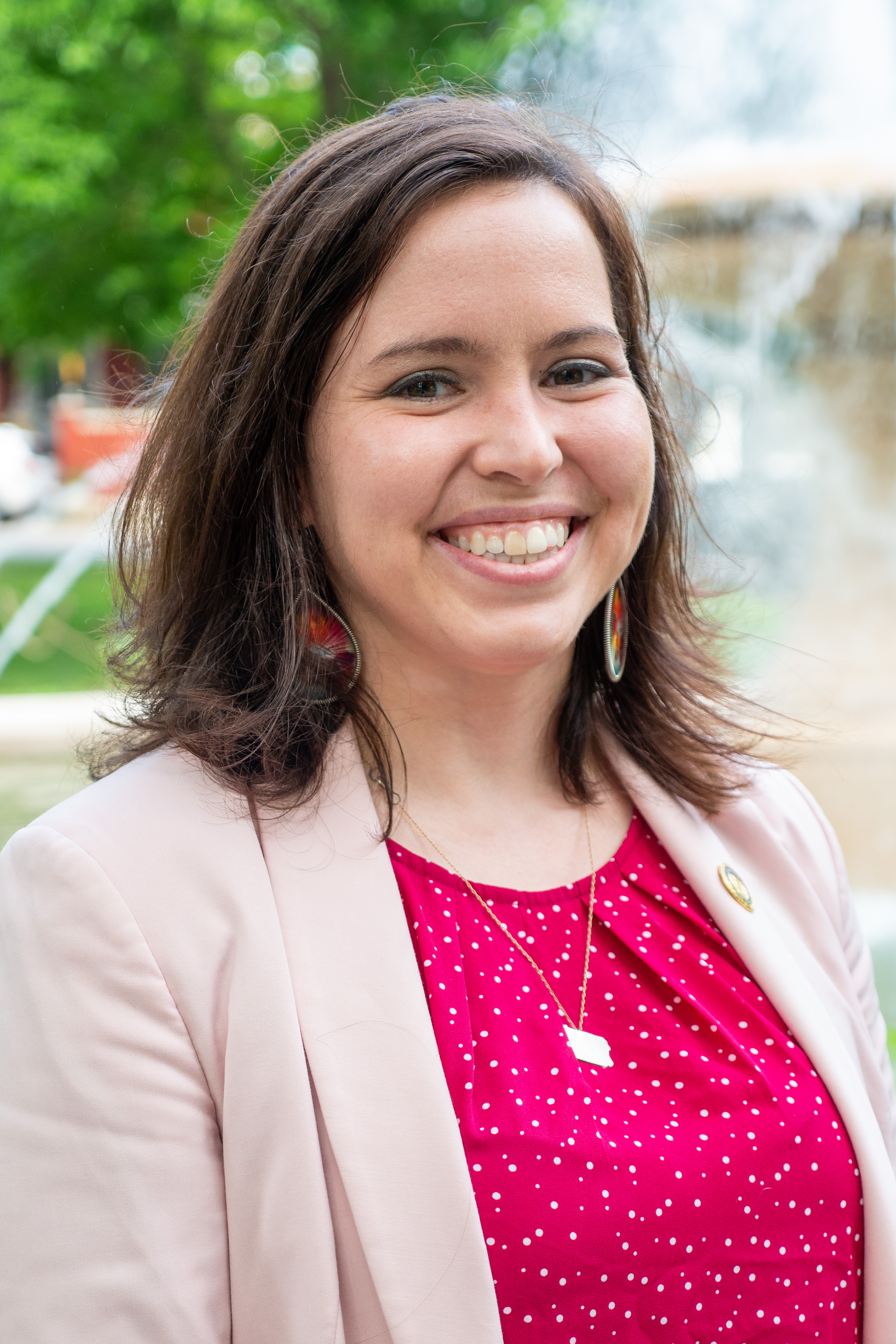

Member of the Pennsylvania House of Representatives from the 20th district
- Incumbent
- Assumed office January 5, 2021
- Preceded by: Adam Ravenstahl

Personal details
- Born: June 4, 1987 (age 39)
- Party: Democratic
- Education: Bloomsburg University of Pennsylvania; University of Pittsburgh School of Law

Emily Kinkead is an American politician. She is a Democrat in the Pennsylvania House of Representatives. In 2020, Kinkead was elected to represent District 20, which encompasses several communities in Pittsburgh and Allegheny County.

== Education ==
In 2009, Kinkead earned a Bachelor of Science degree in biology and a Bachelor of Arts degree in political science from Bloomsburg University of Pennsylvania. In 2016, she earned her Juris Doctor degree from the University of Pittsburgh School of Law.

== Background ==
Kinkead is a private-practice lawyer from the Brighton Heights neighborhood of Pittsburgh. Previously, Kinkead has worked in Washington, D.C., for Common Cause on government ethics reform, for the National Institutes of Health and as a judicial law clerk for Allegheny County Commonwealth Court judge Michael Wojcik.

== Political career ==
In 2019, Kinkead and Emily Marburger, mayor of Bellevue, Pennsylvania, entered the Democratic primary against Adam Ravenstahl, the incumbent in their district. In November 2019, Marburger dropped out of the race. Kinkead defeated Ravenstahl in the primary on June 2, 2020.

She was unopposed in the general election on November 3, 2020, and took office on December 1, 2020.

Kinkead was unopposed in the Democratic primary election in April 2024 and won in the general election on November 5, 2024, defeating Republican Matt Kruth with 59% of the vote.

=== Committee assignments ===
- Agriculture & Rural Affairs
- Appropriations
- Committee On Committees
- Human Services
- Judiciary
