= Stephen Grabowski =

American politician

Stephen S. Grabowski

Member of the Pittsburgh City Council
- In office January 2, 1984 – January 4, 1988
- Preceded by: Eugene "Jeep" DePasquale
- Succeeded by: Jim Ferlo

Member of the Pennsylvania House of Representatives from the 20th district
- In office January 2, 1979 – November 30, 1982
- Preceded by: William Quest
- Succeeded by: Tom Murphy

Personal details
- Born: April 1, 1952 (age 74) Pittsburgh, Pennsylvania, United States
- Party: Democratic

Stephen S. Grabowski (born April 1, 1952) is a former Democratic member of the Pennsylvania House of Representatives.
