= Eugene Scanlon =

American politician

Eugene F. Scanlon Sr.

Member of the Pennsylvania Senate from the 42nd district
- In office January 7, 1975 – March 10, 1994
- Preceded by: Thomas Lamb
- Succeeded by: Jack Wagner
- Constituency: Part of Allegheny County

Member of the Pennsylvania House of Representatives from the 17th district
- In office January 7, 1969 – November 30, 1974
- Preceded by: District created
- Succeeded by: Leonard Sweeney

Personal details
- Born: December 19, 1924 Pittsburgh, Pennsylvania
- Died: March 10, 1994 (aged 69) Pittsburgh, Pennsylvania
- Party: Democratic
- Children: Eugene Scanlon Jr.

Eugene F. Scanlon Sr. (December 19, 1924 – March 10, 1994) is a former Democratic member of the Pennsylvania State Senate who represented the 42nd District from 1975 until his death in 1994. He was also a member of the Pennsylvania House of Representatives.
