= Yarone Zober =

American politician

Pittsburgh Mayoral Chief of Staff
- In office September 2006 – January 6, 2014
- Preceded by: Dick Skrinjar
- Succeeded by: Kevin Acklin

Personal details
- Born: March 24, 1975 (age 51) Israel
- Education: Carnegie Mellon University (Masters); University of Pittsburgh School of Law (JD)

Yarone Zober, a Democrat, (born March 24, 1975, in Israel, to American parents) served as chief of staff to Mayor Luke Ravenstahl of Pittsburgh, Pennsylvania, from 2006 until 2014. He also is a former chair of the Urban Redevelopment Authority of Pittsburgh. He has previously served as Acting Mayor of Pittsburgh during the illness of Mayor Bob O'Connor during his illness.

A graduate of Peabody High School, Zober earned his bachelor's degree from the University of Pittsburgh, and a master's degree in public management from Carnegie Mellon University's Heinz College. He also earned a Juris Doctor degree from University of Pittsburgh School of Law in 2003.

Zober has previously worked, among other things, as an aide for Jim Ferlo’s successful campaign for Pennsylvania State Senate, and as city policy director for Mayor Bob O'Connor’s administration. He was elected and served as the President of the Pennsylvania Young Democrats from June 2005 until June 2007. In July, 2006, he was named Director of Pittsburgh's General Services Department.

On August 6, 2006, Zober was appointed by O’Connor to the position of Deputy Mayor. Due to O’Connor’s continued struggle with lymphoma and his uncertain prognosis, Zober was granted authority to run the city. His tenure as Deputy Mayor ended on September 1 when O'Connor died and City Council president Luke Ravenstahl was sworn in as mayor. In Ravenstahl's first speech as mayor, he appointed Zober as chief of staff. At the time, he was considered to be "Pittsburgh's chief deal sealer." According to Senator and former President of the Pittsburgh City Council Jim Ferlo, "If you want to attribute a third Renaissance to this administration, which I think it's fair to do, none of that would have happened without Yarone's leadership."

In 2013, he testified to a grand jury after he was "subpoenaed to testify as a fact witness" about the activities of Pittsburgh Mayor Luke Ravenstahl.

Outside of his professional career, Zober has experience in dance and theatre. As a high school senior, he was a nominee for the Gene Kelly Award for Excellence in High School Musical Theater.
