= Mark DeSantis (businessman) =

American tech entrepreneur and consultant

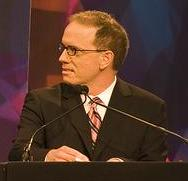
- DeSantis participates in a mayoral election debate at Point Park University in 2007.
- Born: Mark Francis DeSantis; June 16, 1959 (age 67); Pittsburgh, Pennsylvania, U.S.
- Education: University of Dayton
- Occupation: Entrepreneur
- Parent(s): Paul and Beverly DeSantis

Mark DeSantis (born June 16, 1959) is an American tech entrepreneur and is the CEO of Musing AI. He was previously the CEO of Bloomfield Robotics (acquired by Kubota Corporation). He was CEO and cofounder of RoadBotics, an AI-based product that monitors and manages roadway infrastructure (acquired by Michelin). Prior to that, he cofounded and was Executive Chairman of kWantix, an energy hedge fund, and cofounded and was CEO of kWantera, a GE Ventures-backed energy predictive analytics company. Previously, Mark was CEO of Think Through Learning, a venture-backed online tutoring company, and US Managing Director of ANGLE Technology, PLC, a UK-based venture capital firm and consultancy. Mark co-founded and serves as a director for several other venture-backed tech firms. He currently lives in Pittsburgh, Pennsylvania, and was also a Republican mayoral candidate in the 2007 Pittsburgh election.

DeSantis was previously the Director of Government Relations for Texas Instruments, Inc., in Washington DC. He served in a number of policy positions in the federal government, including serving as a senior policy analyst in both The White House Office of Science and Technology Policy and the U.S. Department of Commerce in the first Bush administration [2] He was also on the staff of the late U.S. Senator John Heinz ,and before that, he was a management consultant with Booz Allen Hamilton.

DeSantis headed a GOP-led group called "Citizens for Democratic Reform" that supported the elimination of Allegheny County row offices. In May 2005, this effort succeeded in reducing the number of row offices from 10 to 4.

Mark is currently an adjunct professor at both the Carnegie Mellon College of Engineering and Heinz College at Carnegie Mellon University and has lectured at Princeton University and Wharton Business School. He was previously an adjunct professor at the University of Maryland. Mark holds a BA and MBA from the University of Dayton, an MS in Technology Management from The American University, a PhD in Public Policy from the Schar School of Policy and Government at George Mason University, and a Doctorate in Business Administration from the Fox School of Business at Temple University⁣ . He is an adviser to Cybernetix Ventures. He is a board member of the Regional Industrial Development Corporation and Allies for Children. He is the coauthor of the book, "The Real AI: Creating a Learning Advantage with Cogniitve Capital."

In 2007, DeSantis ran for Mayor of Pittsburgh against Luke Ravenstahl. In 2009 DeSantis was selected as Pittsburgh's "Entrepreneur of the Year".

== Awards and honors ==
Awards	Year	Ref
Pittsburgh Business Times Entrepreneur of the Year	2009	

Republican nominee for Pittsburgh Mayor
Preceded by Joe Weinroth	Election of 2007	Succeeded by Joshua Wander
