= Eugene Scanlon Jr. =

American judge

Eugene F. Scanlon Jr.

Judge of the Allegheny County Court of Common Pleas
- In office 1998–2009
- Appointed by: Tom Ridge
- Succeeded by: Ference Olson

Personal details
- Relations: Eugene Scanlon Sr.

Eugene F. Scanlon Jr. is a former judge of Common Pleas in Allegheny County.
