= Rich Fitzgerald =

American politician (born 1959)

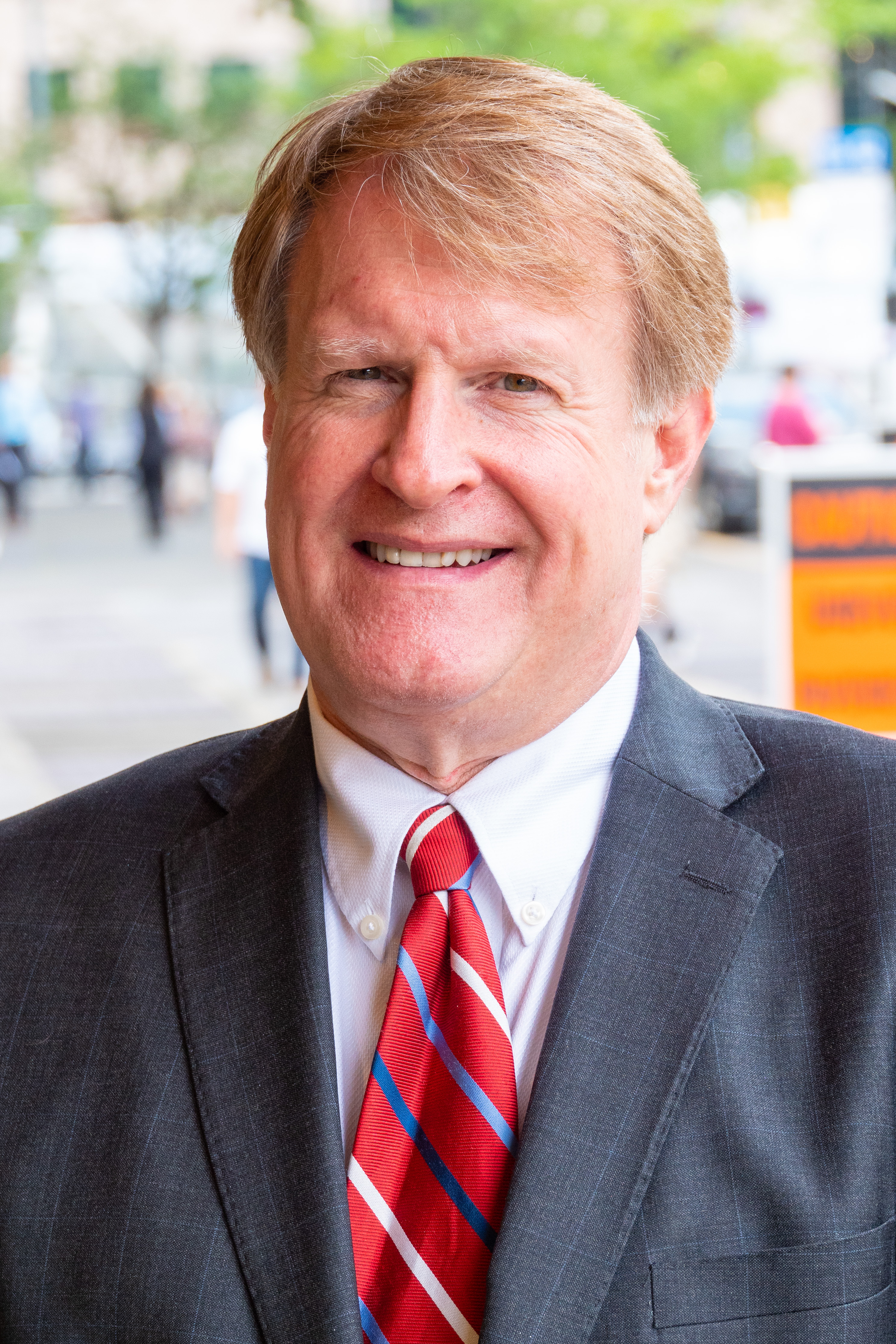

Executive of Allegheny County
- In office January 3, 2012 – January 2, 2024
- Preceded by: Dan Onorato
- Succeeded by: Sara Innamorato

Personal details
- Born: May 8, 1959 (age 67) Pittsburgh, Pennsylvania, U.S.
- Party: Democratic
- Spouse: Cathy Tomasovich
- Children: 8
- Education: Carnegie Mellon University (BS)

Rich Fitzgerald (born May 8, 1959) is an American elected official who served as the 3rd County Executive of Allegheny County. A member of the Democratic Party, he previously served as a member of Allegheny County Council from 2000 until 2011 as the District 11 representative.

== Early life and education ==
Fitzgerald was born on May 8, 1959, in Pittsburgh's Bloomfield neighborhood. He is the oldest son of Dick and Pat Fitzgerald. He attended St. Lawrence O'Toole grade school and later Central Catholic High School. He then attended Carnegie Mellon University, where he earned a degree in mechanical engineering, with a minor in business.

== Career ==
Before his political career, Fitzgerald owned his own business, Aquenef, which was involved in saving energy for commercial and industrial applications. The company provided equipment and controls.

Fitzgerald became the first County Council member for District 11 in January 2000 and held the seat through 2011. From 2004-2011, he served as the President of Council.

He ran for County Executive in 2011, defeating former county Controller Mark Patrick Flaherty in the Democratic primary and Republican D. Raja in the general election. Fitzgerald was sworn into office as County Executive on January 3, 2012. He was re-elected in 2015, defeating Republican businessman Dale Holman, and in 2019, defeating Republican former county Councilor Matt Drozd.

During his tenure as County Executive, Fitzgerald focused on growing the economy, attracting young people, diversifying the job market, investing in infrastructure, improving public health and protecting the environment. He has also worked with state and local officials from both parties on regional issues such as transportation, education, housing and human services. He did not raise taxes during his three terms which were also marked by no budgetary layoffs. His leadership on the county's budget also improved the county's credit rating.

In November 2023, it was announced that he had been selected as the new Executive Director of the Southwestern Pennsylvania Commission. As County Executive, he served as a member of the commission for 12 years, including two years as its Chair (2020-2021). He started in his new role as Executive Director in January 2024.

== Political beliefs ==
Fitzgerald identifies himself as a Democrat who believes in investing in infrastructure, education, health care, and environmental protection. He also supports labor unions, women's rights, and LGBTQ rights. He has been a strong ally of Governor Josh Shapiro, President Joe Biden and former Governor Tom Wolf, and has worked with Republican leaders such as former County Executive Jim Roddey and former Governor Tom Corbett on regional issues.

== Personal life ==
Fitzgerald is married to pharmacist Cathy Tomasovich. They reside in Squirrel Hill and have eight children.

Political offices
Preceded by Dan Onorato	Executive of Allegheny County; 2012–2024	Succeeded by Sara Innamorato
