= Pennsylvania House of Representatives, District 20 =

American legislative district

Pennsylvania's 20th State House of Representatives district
Representative
Emily Kinkead; D–Pittsburgh
- Population (2022): 61,715

The 20th District of the Pennsylvania House of Representatives is located in Allegheny County in southwestern Pennsylvania, covering parts of the city of Pittsburgh and its northern suburbs. It has been represented by Emily Kinkead since 2021.

== District profile ==
Pennsylvania's 20th District is located in Allegheny County and includes the following areas:

- Avalon
- Bellevue
- Pittsburgh (part)
  - Ward 26 (part)
    - Division 12
    - Division 13
    - Division 15
  - Ward 27 (part)
    - Division 01
    - Division 02
    - Division 03
    - Division 04
    - Division 05
    - Division 07
    - Division 08
- Ross Township
- West View

== Representatives ==
Representative	Party	Years	District home	Notes
Before 1969, seats were apportioned by county.
Paul W. Miller	Democrat	1969 – 1970		
Michael M. Mullen	Democrat	1971 – 1972		
Andrew Fenrich	Democrat	1973 – 1974		
Michael M. Mullen	Democrat	1975 – 1978		Died in office on February 19
William Quest	Democrat	1978		Elected to fill vacancy on June 5
Stephen Grabowski	Democrat	1979 – 1982		Defeated for re-nomination
Thomas J. Murphy, Jr.	Democrat	1983 – 1993	Pittsburgh	Resigned December 15 after being elected mayor of Pittsburgh
Barbara Burns	Democrat	1994		Elected to fill vacancy on March 7
Don Walko	Democrat	1995 – 2010	Pittsburgh	Resigned after being elected district judge
Adam Ravenstahl	Democrat	2010 – 2020	Pittsburgh	Defeated for re-nomination on June 2, 2020
Emily Kinkead	Democrat	2021 – present	Pittsburgh	

== Recent election results ==
PA House election, 2024: Pennsylvania House, District 20
Party	Candidate	Votes	%
Democratic	Emily Kinkead (incumbent)	21,300	59.21
Republican	Matt Kruth	14,671	40.79
Total votes		35,971	100.00
Democratic hold			

PA House election, 2022: Pennsylvania House, District 20
Party	Candidate	Votes	%
Democratic	Emily Kinkead (incumbent)	17,783	61.12
Republican	Matt Kruth	11,313	38.88
Total votes		29,096	100.00
Democratic hold			

PA House election, 2020: Pennsylvania House, District 20
Party	Candidate	Votes	%
Democratic	Emily Kinkead	Unopposed	
Total votes		27,680	100.00
Democratic hold			

PA House election, 2018: Pennsylvania House, District 20
Party	Candidate	Votes	%
Democratic	Adam Ravenstahl (incumbent)	Unopposed	
Total votes		22,011	100.00
Democratic hold			

PA House election, 2016: Pennsylvania House, District 20
Party	Candidate	Votes	%
Democratic	Adam Ravenstahl (incumbent)	23,000	80.90
Constitution	Jim Barr	5,429	19.10
Total votes		28,429	100.00
Democratic hold			

PA House election, 2014: Pennsylvania House, District 20
Party	Candidate	Votes	%
Democratic	Adam Ravenstahl (incumbent)	9,997	60.74
Republican	Tom Fodi	6,463	39.26
Total votes		16,460	100.00
Democratic hold			

PA House election, 2012: Pennsylvania House, District 20
Party	Candidate	Votes	%
Democratic	Adam Ravenstahl (incumbent)	19,909	81.72
Constitution	Jim Barr	4,453	18.28
Total votes		24,362	100.00
Democratic hold			

PA House election, 2010: Pennsylvania House, District 20
Party	Candidate	Votes	%
Democratic	Adam Ravenstahl (incumbent)	10,639	59.26
Republican	Alex Dubart	6,384	35.56
Independent	Kenneth Vybiral	929	5.17
Total votes		17,952	100.00
Democratic hold			
