= Pittsburgh City Council =

Legislative body in the City of Pittsburgh

City Council of the City of Pittsburgh

Type
- Type: Full-time mayor-council
- Houses: Unicameral

History
- Preceded by: Borough of Pittsburgh House of Burgesses City of Pittsburgh Select Council and City of Pittsburgh Common Council

Leadership
- Council President: R. Daniel Lavelle, Democratic since January 8, 2024
- City Clerk: Kimberly Clark-Baskin

Structure
- Seats: 9
- Political groups: Democratic
- Committees: Finance and Law; Public Safety; Public Works; Human Resources; Land Use and Economic Development; Urban Recreation; Innovation, Performance, and Asset Management; Intergovernmental Affairs, Hearings
- Length of term: 4 Years

Elections
- Voting system: Plurality by District
- Redistricting: Decennial

Motto
- Benigno Numine (by the favor of the heavens)

Meeting place
- Council Chamber
- City-County Building

Website
- pittsburghpa.gov/council/index.html

Constitution
- Home Rule Charter Code of Ordinances Rules of Council

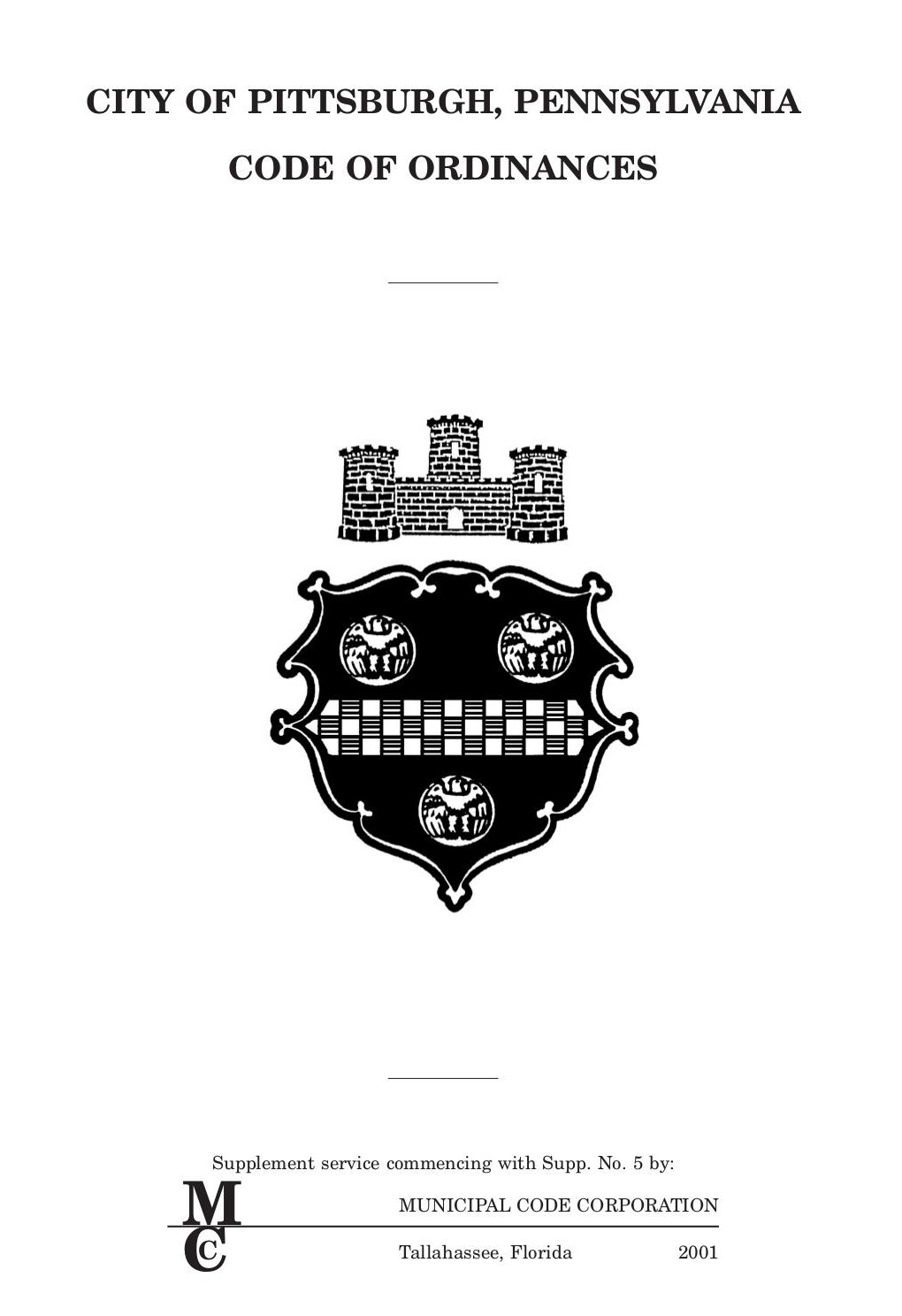
Title page of the Pittsburgh Code of Ordinances

The Pittsburgh City Council serves as the legislative body in the City of Pittsburgh. It consists of nine members. City council members are chosen by plurality elections in each of nine districts. The city operates under a mayor-council system of local governance.

== Current membership ==
The current members of the city council are:

District	Name	Took office	Committee chairship	Party	Current term expires
1	Bobby Wilson‡	2020	Land Use and Economic Development	Democratic	Jan. 3, 2028
2	Kim Salinetro	2026	Recreation, Youth and Senior Services	Democratic	Jan. 7, 2030
3	Robert Charland III	2024	Human Resources	Democratic	Jan. 3, 2028
4	Anthony Coghill	2018	Public Safety and Wellness	Democratic	Jan. 7, 2030
5	Barbara Warwick	2022	Public Works and Infrastructure	Democratic	Jan. 3, 2028
6	R. Daniel Lavelle†	2010	Hearings	Democratic	Jan. 7, 2030
7	Deborah Gross	2014	Innovation, Performance Asset Management and Technology	Democratic	Jan. 3, 2028
8	Erika Strassburger	2018	Finance and Law	Democratic	Jan. 7, 2030
9	Khari Mosley	2024	Intergovernmental and Educational Affairs	Democratic	Jan. 3, 2028

† Denotes Council President (since 2024)

‡ Denotes Council President pro tempore (since 2024)

== Past presidents ==
- Theresa Kail-Smith (2020–2024)
- Bruce Kraus (2014–2020)
- Darlene Harris (2010–2014)
- Doug Shields (2006–2010)
- Luke Ravenstahl (2005–2006)
- Gene Ricciardi (2002–2005)
- Bob O'Connor (1998–2002)
- Jim Ferlo (1994–1998)
- Jack Wagner (1990–1994)
- Ben Woods (1988–1990)
- Sophie Masloff (1988)
- Ben Woods (1985–1988)
- Robert Rade Stone (1985)
- Eugene "Jeep" DePasquale (1978–1984)
- Richard Caliguiri (1977–1978)
- Louis Mason (1970–1977)
- John F. Counahan (1968–1970)
- Thomas Gallagher (1936–1959)
- Robert Garland (c. 1934)
- James F. Malone (c. 1928)
- James Ross (1817)

== Past members ==
- Theresa Kail-Smith (2009–2026)
- Ricky Burgess (2008–2024)
- Bruce Kraus (2014–2024)
- Corey O'Connor (2012–2022)
- Darlene Harris (2006–2020)
- Daniel Gilman (2014–2018)
- Natalia Rudiak (2009–2018)
- Patrick Dowd (2008–2013)
- Bill Peduto (2002–2014)
- Towanda Carlisle (2002–2007)
- Barbara Burns (2000–2004)
- Sala Udin (1997–2007)
- Dan Onorato (1992–2000)
- Bob O'Connor (1991–2003)
- Gene Ricciardi (1988–2006)
- Christopher Smith (1993–1994)
- Jake Milliones (1990–1993)
- Michael Coyne (1988–1992)
- Bernard Regan (1988–1992)
- Jack Wagner (1984–1994)
- Alan Hertzberg (1994–2005)
- Jim Ferlo (1988–2002)
- Otis Lyons Jr. (1988–1989)
- Mark Pollock (1986–1989)
- Stephen Grabowski (1984–1988)
- Ben Woods (1981–1989)
- Thomas E. Flaherty (1980–1983)
- Jim O'Malley (1980–1987)
- Michelle Madoff (1978–1994)
- William Robinson (1978–1985)
- Jim Bulls (1977–1980)
- Sophie Masloff (1976–1988)
- Richard E. Givens (1976–1987)
- James Lally (1976–1980)
- Frank Lucchino (1974–1978)
- John Lynch (1970–1976)
- William J. Coyne (1974–1981)
- Robert Rade Stone (1973–1985)
- Eugene "Jeep" DePasquale (1972–1984, 1988–1989)
- Richard Caligiuri (1970–1977)
- Charles Leslie (1970–1972)
- Amy Ballinger (1970–1976)
- James Cortese (1970)
- George Shields (1970–1974)
- John Lynch (1970–1976)
- Edgar Michaels (1969–1974)
- Thomas Fagan (1968–1973)
- Louis Mason Jr. (1967–1977)
- Peter Flaherty (1966–1970)
- Walter Kamyk (1963–1970)
- Charles Leslie (1961–1969)
- Phillip Baskin (1962–1970)
- James Jordan (1960–1967)
- Horner Green (1960–1961)
- George Shields (1970–1974)
- Edgar Michaels (1969–1974)
- J. Craig Kuhn (1959–1970)
- Charles McCarthy (1958–1963)
- David Olbum (1956–1961)
- Irma D'Ascenzo (1956–1970)
- Paul Jones (1954–1960)
- Emanuel Schifano (1952–1956)
- Bennett Rodgers (1952–1959)
- Charles Dinan (1952–1958)
- John Counahan (1952–1970)
- William Davis (1951–1953)
- Patrick Fagan (1950–1967)
- Frederick Weir (1947–1960)
- William Alvah Stewart (1946–1951)
- Joseph A. McArdle (1942–1949)
- Thomas Kilgallen (1940–1951)
- John Duff Jr. (1940–1952)
- Edward Leonard (1939–1951)
- A.L. Wolk (1938–1956)
- James A. O'Toole (1936–1941)
- Frederick Weir (1936–1947)
- Cornelius Scully (1935–1936)
- George Evans (1935–1945)
- William Magee (1934–1937)
- John Jane (1934–1935)
- John Houston (1934–1935)
- Thomas Gallagher (1934–1965)
- Walter Demmer (1934–1951)
- Frank Duggan (1933)
- George Oliver (1933)
- William Soost (1932–1935)
- John Phillips (1931–1932)
- Michael Muldowney (1930–1933)
- Clifford Connelley (1930–1933)
- George J. Kambach (1929–1931)
- Harry A. Little (1926–1933)
- Robert J. Alderdice (1924–1932)
- Joseph F. Malone (1922–1930)
- Wallace Borland (1922–1925)
- Charles Anderson (1920–1939)
- A.K. Oliver (1919–1921)
- John H. Henderson (1919–1921)
- Daniel Winters (1918–1929)
- William J. Burke (1918–1919)
- William H. Robertson (1916–1924)
- John H. Dailey (1916–1921)
- P.J. McArdle (1911–1913, 1916–1919, 1922–1930, 1932–1940)
- Charles H. Hetzel (1914–1915)
- W.Y. English (1914–1933)
- John S. Herron (1914–1933)
- G.A. Dillinger (1913–1917)
- Robert Garland (1911–1939)
- S.S. Wooburn (1911–1939)
- W.G. Wilkins (1911–1913)
- Enoch Rauh (1911–1919)
- James P. Kerr (1911–1918)
- John M. Goehring (1911–1915)
- W.A. Hoeveler (1911–1914)
- Edward V. Babcock (1911–1913)
- David P. Black (1911)
- A.J. Kelly (1911)
- Robert McKnight (1847–1849)

== See also ==
- List of mayors of Pittsburgh
- Pittsburgh Mayoral Chief of Staff
