= 2009 Pittsburgh mayoral election =

- November 3, 2009
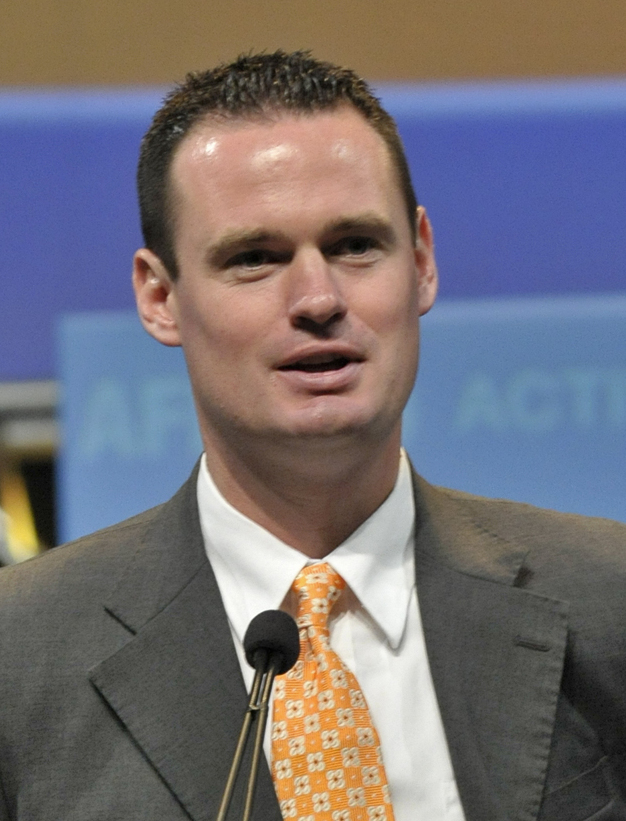

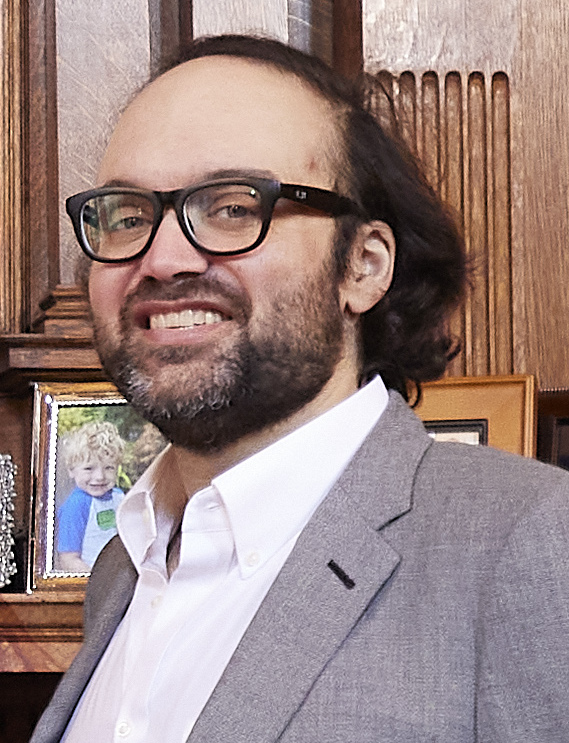

Candidate	Luke Ravenstahl	Franco Dok Harris	Kevin Acklin
Party	Democratic	Franco Dok Harris	Independent
Alliance	Republican
Popular vote	28,582	13,094	9,903
Percentage	55.2%	25.3%	19.2%
Mayor before election
Luke Ravenstahl
Democratic
Elected Mayor
Luke Ravenstahl
Democratic

Pittsburgh held a mayoral election on November 3, 2009. Incumbent mayor Luke Ravenstahl, a Democrat, defeated his two independent challengers by a wide margin. The 2009 election was the first regular-cycle election in which Ravenstahl participated; he was originally appointed as an interim mayor to succeed Bob O'Connor and subsequently won a special election in 2007.

== Primary ==
The primary election was held on May 19, 2009. In the Democratic primary, incumbent Mayor Ravenstahl defeated challengers Patrick Dowd, a Pittsburgh city councilman, and Carmen Robinson, an attorney and former police officer.

The Republican primary had no names on the ballot for the office of mayor. Ravenstahl, a Democrat, won the Republican mayoral nomination with 607 write-in votes; no other candidate had the 250 write-in votes required to become the Republican nominee.

== General ==
Ravenstahl, having been nominated by both the Democratic Party and the Republican Party, appeared on the general-election ballot with both affiliations. He was joined by two other candidates: businessman Franco 'Dok' Harris (the son of Pittsburgh Steelers legend Franco Harris), who ran under the Franco Dok Harris Party, and attorney Kevin Acklin, who ran as an independent. Ravenstahl's relationship with lobbyist John Verbanac became a campaign issue.

Ravenstahl defeated both Harris and Acklin by a wide margin, winning over 55 percent of the vote.

== Election results ==
=== Democratic primary ===
2009 Pittsburgh mayoral election, Democratic primary
Party	Candidate	Votes	%
Democratic	Luke Ravenstahl (incumbent)	26,880	59.06
Democratic	Patrick Dowd	12,610	27.71
Democratic	Carmen Robinson	5,926	13.02
Write-in		94	0.21
Total votes		45,510	100

=== General election ===
2009 Pittsburgh general mayoral election
Party	Candidate	Votes	%
Democratic/Republican	Luke Ravenstahl (incumbent)	28,582	55.22%
Franco Dok Harris	Franco Dok Harris	13,094	25.30
Independent	Kevin Acklin	9,918	19.16
Write-in		168	0.32
Total votes		51,762	100

Preceded by 2007	Pittsburgh mayoral election 2009	Succeeded by 2013
