= USS Prince William =

Two escort carriers of the United States Navy have been named USS Prince William, after Prince William Sound in Alaska.

- USS Prince William (CVE-19) was transferred to the Royal Navy in 1943 and served as HMS Striker (D12) until 1946.
- USS Prince William (CVE-31) was engaged in transport and training duties from commissioning in 1943 to decommissioning in 1946.
