= 2007 Pittsburgh mayoral special election =

- November 6, 2007
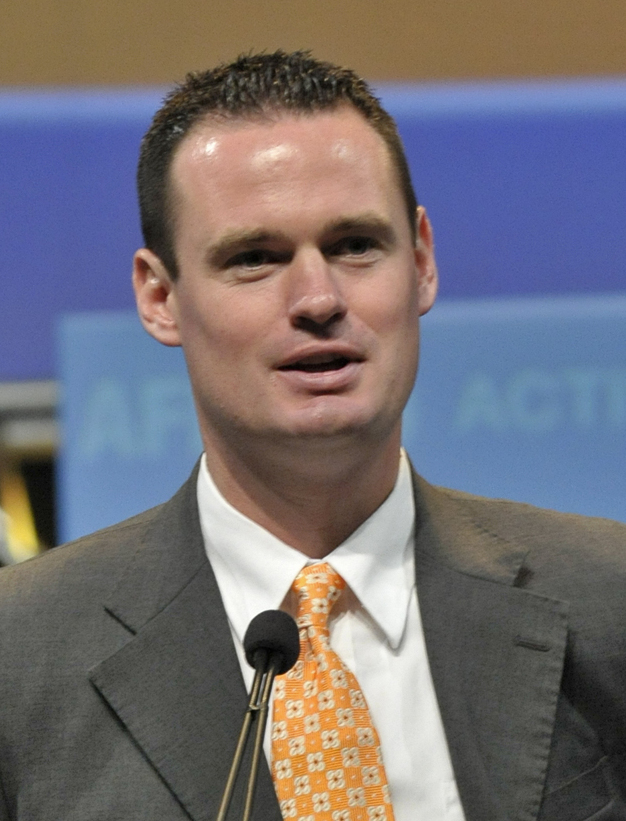

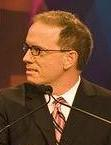
Nominee	Luke Ravenstahl	Mark DeSantis
Party	Democratic	Republican
Popular vote	43,557	24,025
Percentage	63.2%	34.9%
- Results by ward division The darkest blue shade represents more than 80% of votes were for Ravenstahl. The middle and lightest shades indicate over 65% and 50%, respectively. The darker shade of red represents more than 70% for DeSantis, the lighter shade of red more than 50%.
Mayor before election
Luke Ravenstahl
Democratic
Elected Mayor
Luke Ravenstahl
Democratic

The mayoral election of 2007 in Pittsburgh, Pennsylvania was a special election held on Tuesday, November 6, 2007. The incumbent mayor, Luke Ravenstahl of the Democratic Party faced Republican challenger Mark DeSantis, a telecommunications executive and adjunct professor at Carnegie Mellon University. The race was notable for the strength of its Republican challenger, rare in Pittsburgh, and the election of such a young mayor, Ravenstahl being 27 years old at the time. Ravenstahl was elected with a comfortable margin in an election marked by unusually cold weather but record voter turnout.

== Overview ==
The mayor of Pittsburgh is elected to the post in four year terms. The previous mayor, Bob O'Connor, was elected to the position on November 8, 2005, and began to serve January 3, 2006. However, O'Connor was diagnosed with lymphoma of the central nervous system on July 10, 2006. The prognosis was initially good as the mayor began treatment, including chemotherapy, immediately, but O'Connor experienced many complications and died 8:55 PM local time September 1, 2006 at the age of 61. Ravenstahl, president of the city council, was sworn in as the new mayor at 10:36 PM local time, and would serve until a special election would be held to determine if he should complete O'Connor's term.

== Primary elections ==
Primary elections were held for both parties during county-wide elections on May 15, 2007. No candidates ran in the Republican primary, with DeSantis entering the race afterwards. Although it had appeared earlier that councilman Bill Peduto, who ran against O'Connor in the 2005 primary, would challenge Ravenstahl in the Democratic Primary, he dropped out of the race and Ravenstahl won 95.94% of the Democratic primary vote.

Democratic mayoral primary results
	Vote total	Percentage
Luke Ravenstahl	34,456	95.94%
Write-in	1,459	4.06%

== General election ==
The general election was held on November 6, 2007, in unusually cold and windy weather which included the city's first snowfall of the year. Voter turnout was estimated to be around 29%, and very few problems were reported at the polls. DeSantis polled well in more affluent areas of the city, such as Squirrel Hill, while Ravenstahl commanded large portions of the vote in the city's black and working class white neighborhoods, such as the Hill District. The race was more competitive than usual in the heavily Democratic city, but was sufficiently one-sided that the Associated Press declared Ravenstahl to be victorious only slightly more than one and a half hours after the polls had closed and only 20% of city precincts had reported voting totals. DeSantis conceded defeat to Ravenstahl shortly after, around 10 PM local time. Despite losing by more than thirty percentage points in general polling, DeSantis's performance was considered quite good for a Republican candidate, indeed the best performance in several decades.

Pittsburgh mayoral special election, 2007
Party	Candidate	Votes	%
Democratic	Luke Ravenstahl	43,557	63.22
Republican	Mark DeSantis	24,025	34.87
Socialist Workers	Ryan Scott	550	0.80
Libertarian	Tony Oliva	504	0.74
Write-in		262	0.38
Total votes		68,898	100.00

Preceded by 2005	Pittsburgh mayoral special election 2007	Succeeded by 2009
