= Don Walko =

American politician

Member of the Pennsylvania House of Representatives from the 20th district
- In office January 3, 1995 – January 3, 2010
- Preceded by: Barbara Burns
- Succeeded by: Adam Ravenstahl

Personal details
- Born: February 24, 1953 (age 73) Greensburg, Pennsylvania
- Party: Democratic
- Spouse: Julie Jarbeck Walko
- Education: Penn State University; Dickinson School of Law
- Occupation: Attorney

Don Walko (born February 24, 1953) was a Democratic member of the Pennsylvania House of Representatives for the 20th District. Walko was elected in 1994 and was in office until 2010. He resigned on January 3 after being elected a judge for the 5th District of the Allegheny County Court Common Pleas.
