= Jim Roddey =

American businessman and politician (1933–2024)

Allegheny County Chief Executive
- In office January 3, 2000 – January 2, 2004
- Preceded by: Office created
- Succeeded by: Dan Onorato

Chairperson of the Allegheny County Republican Party
- In office December 14, 2005 – February 2016
- Preceded by: Bob Glancy
- Succeeded by: D. Raja

Personal details
- Born: 1933 Asheville, North Carolina, U.S.
- Died: March 7, 2024 (aged 91) Pittsburgh, Pennsylvania, U.S.
- Party: Republican
- Education: Texas Christian University

James C. Roddey (1933 – March 7, 2024) was an American businessman and politician in Pennsylvania best known for being the first chief executive of Allegheny County, Pennsylvania, from 2000 to 2004. He was a Republican and was the chair of the Republican Committee of Allegheny County, from 2005 until 2016.

== Early life and career ==
Roddey was originally from Asheville, North Carolina. He graduated from Texas Christian University in Fort Worth, Texas with a degree in speech. He was a former United States Marine Corps captain, and moved to Pittsburgh in 1979. "Roddey grew to become a champion speedster in track and field, a dedicated Marine, a close associate of Ted Turner’s, a business success in his own right, an intrepid racer of sailboats, and a wit, humorist and raconteur without peer in Pittsburgh," according to Pittsburgh Quarterly.

== Professional career ==
Roddey served on the boards of Turner Communication Corp, Rollins Communication Corp, and others. He was an emeritus trustee of the University of Pittsburgh and has received three honorary doctorates from various institutions. At various points, he chaired the boards of the Port Authority of Allegheny County, the Pittsburgh Water and Sewer Authority, and the Allegheny County Sanitary Authority. In 2010, Politics Magazine named him one of the most influential Republicans in Pennsylvania.

Roddey once was the head of the company Wexford Health Sources.

=== County Executive ===
Prior to 2000, Allegheny County was governed by a group of three commissioners. In 1998, Roddey was appointed by the commissioners to manage a successful campaign (also initiated by the county commissioners) to replace that system (via a referendum) to a new system composed of a single Chief Executive and a 15-member County Council.

Roddey argued along with the commissioners that this would more evenly distribute representation as the previous system tended to have commissioners predominantly from Pittsburgh, rather than other towns and communities in the county. (Pittsburgh is the county seat and by far the largest population center in the county, but still with only 26% of the county population in the city-proper.)

In 1999, the first election was held for the new Chief Executive and County Council. Roddey won his race against Democrat (and "celebrity" coroner) Cyril Wecht, although Democrats won the majority of the seats on the new Council. This led to friction during his term in office.

During his term, Roddey implemented a property reassessment begun by the former commissioners to reverse the county's financial situation. This increased the value of many homes in the county by 5% — a legal maximum. This increase in tax revenue was not popular, but it did succeed in creating new operating revenue.

=== Defeat and subsequent political activity ===
In 2003, Roddey ran for reelection but lost to Dan Onorato. In interviews, he credits the re-assessments as leading to his decline in popularity. Following his time as Chief Executive, he became an appointed member of Pittsburgh's fiscal oversight board (Pittsburgh Intergovernmental Cooperation Authority), but resigned in February 2005. He was elected chair of the Allegheny County Republican Party in 2005. He drew plaudits for a relatively diminished showing for incumbent Democrat Luke Ravenstahl in the 2007 and 2009 Pittsburgh mayoral elections and Tom Corbett's victory in Allegheny County in the 2010 gubernatorial election, but was criticized for a 2012 speech in which he claimed to have jokingly attempted to yield a handicapped parking space to a man because he, "...saw that Obama sticker and thought [he was] mentally retarded." He retired from his position as Party Chair in 2016, having presided over a period of financial stabilization and tripling membership growth for the organization.

== Death ==
Roddey died on March 7, 2024, at the age of 91.

Political offices
Preceded by Bob Cranmer; Mike Dawida; Larry Dunn; County Commissioners	Chief Executive of Allegheny County; 2000–2004	Succeeded by Dan Onorato
Party political offices
Preceded by Bob Glancy	Chairperson of the Allegheny County Republican Party; 2005–2016	Succeeded by D. Raja
