= Robert Ravenstahl =

American politician

Robert P. Ravenstahl

Member of the Pennsylvania House of Representatives from the 17th district
- In office November 17, 1975 – November 30, 1978
- Preceded by: Leonard Sweeney
- Succeeded by: Thomas Murphy

Personal details
- Born: December 31, 1924 Pittsburgh, Pennsylvania
- Died: September 1, 2015 (aged 90) Gibsonia, Pennsylvania
- Party: Democratic

Robert P. Ravenstahl, Sr. (December 31, 1924 – September 1, 2015) was a Democratic member of the Pennsylvania House of Representatives.

Ravenstahl served in the United States Marine Corps during World War II. He then was a member of the Pittsburgh Fire Department. Ravenstahl served on the Pittsburgh City Council. His grandson, Luke Ravenstahl, was the Mayor of Pittsburgh from September 2006 to January 2014. Robert Ravenstahl died at the age of 90 on September 1, 2015. He was sworn into the House on November 17, 1975 and held office until 1978.
