= Luke Ravenstahl =

American politician

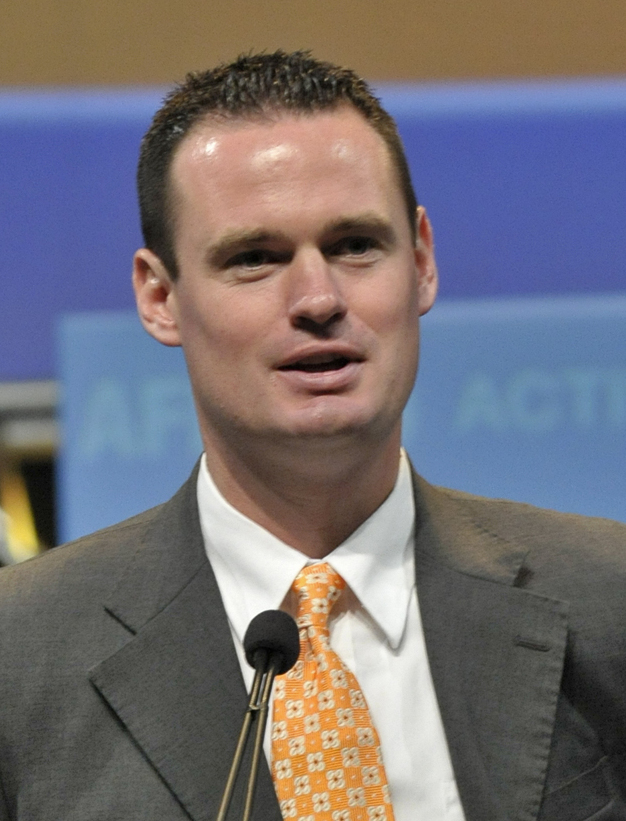

59th Mayor of Pittsburgh
- In office September 1, 2006 – January 6, 2014
- Preceded by: Bob O'Connor
- Succeeded by: Bill Peduto

President of the Pittsburgh City Council
- In office December 6, 2005 – September 1, 2006
- Preceded by: Gene Ricciardi
- Succeeded by: Doug Shields

Member of the Pittsburgh City Council from the 1st district
- In office January 5, 2004 – September 1, 2006
- Preceded by: Barbara Burns
- Succeeded by: Darlene Harris

Personal details
- Born: Luke Robert Ravenstahl; February 6, 1980 (age 46) Pittsburgh, Pennsylvania, U.S.
- Party: Democratic
- Spouse: Erin Lynn Feith (m. 2004; div. 2011)
- Children: 1
- Education: Washington & Jefferson College

Luke Robert Ravenstahl (born February 6, 1980) is an American politician and businessman who served as the 59th Mayor of Pittsburgh from 2006 until 2014. A Democrat, he became the youngest mayor in Pittsburgh's history in September 2006 at the age of 26. He was among the youngest mayors of a major city in American history. He currently serves as an executive of Peoples Natural Gas Company.

A graduate of North Catholic High School, Ravenstahl attended the University of Pittsburgh before graduating from Washington & Jefferson College. Four months after his graduation, aged 23, he ran for a seat on the Pittsburgh City Council. He was elected and took office in January 2004 before being appointed City Council President in December 2005. After the death of Pittsburgh mayor Bob O'Connor, Ravenstahl became the mayor, per the city's charter, on September 1, 2006. He later won a special election in 2007, and a regular election in 2009. He did not seek reelection in the 2013 election and Democrat Bill Peduto was elected to succeed him as mayor. Ravenstahl's term ended in January 2014.

== Personal life ==
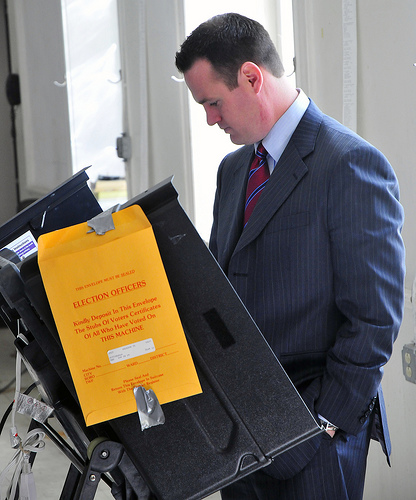
Luke Ravenstahl votes in 2008 Pennsylvania Democratic Presidential Primary on April 22, 2008

Ravenstahl's father, Robert P. Ravenstahl Jr., is a district magistrate on the Northside, and head coach for the North Catholic High School football team. His grandfather, Robert P. Ravenstahl Sr., represented the 20th legislative district as a state representative, was a Democratic ward leader in the North Side, and was defeated in the 1976 Democratic primary by a young Tom Murphy, who would go on to become mayor himself. Ravenstahl's mother is currently a teacher's aide with the Allegheny Intermediate Unit. Luke was the eldest of three brothers including Adam Ravenstahl, a former member of the Pennsylvania House of Representatives.

Ravenstahl graduated from North Catholic High School in 1998, where he was class president and played baseball and football. He attended Washington & Jefferson College, where he graduated with honors with a degree in business administration in December 2002. He was W&J's starting place kicker on the football team for three years and was team captain for his senior year. He currently holds the school record for most consecutive extra points. Following graduation from W&J, Ravenstahl worked as an account manager for a courier service.

In August 2004, he married Erin Lynn Feith, whom he had begun dating in high school. They resided in the Summer Hill neighborhood of the Northside. Ravenstahl is a Roman Catholic and attends mass weekly at Holy Wisdom Parish on the Northside.

Luke and Erin's only child, Cooper Luke Ravenstahl, was born on October 31, 2008.

On May 19, 2007, Ravenstahl delivered the keynote address at Washington & Jefferson College's 208th commencement celebration. He served as honorary co-captain with fellow W&J graduate Roger Goodell during W&J's 2006 homecoming football game.

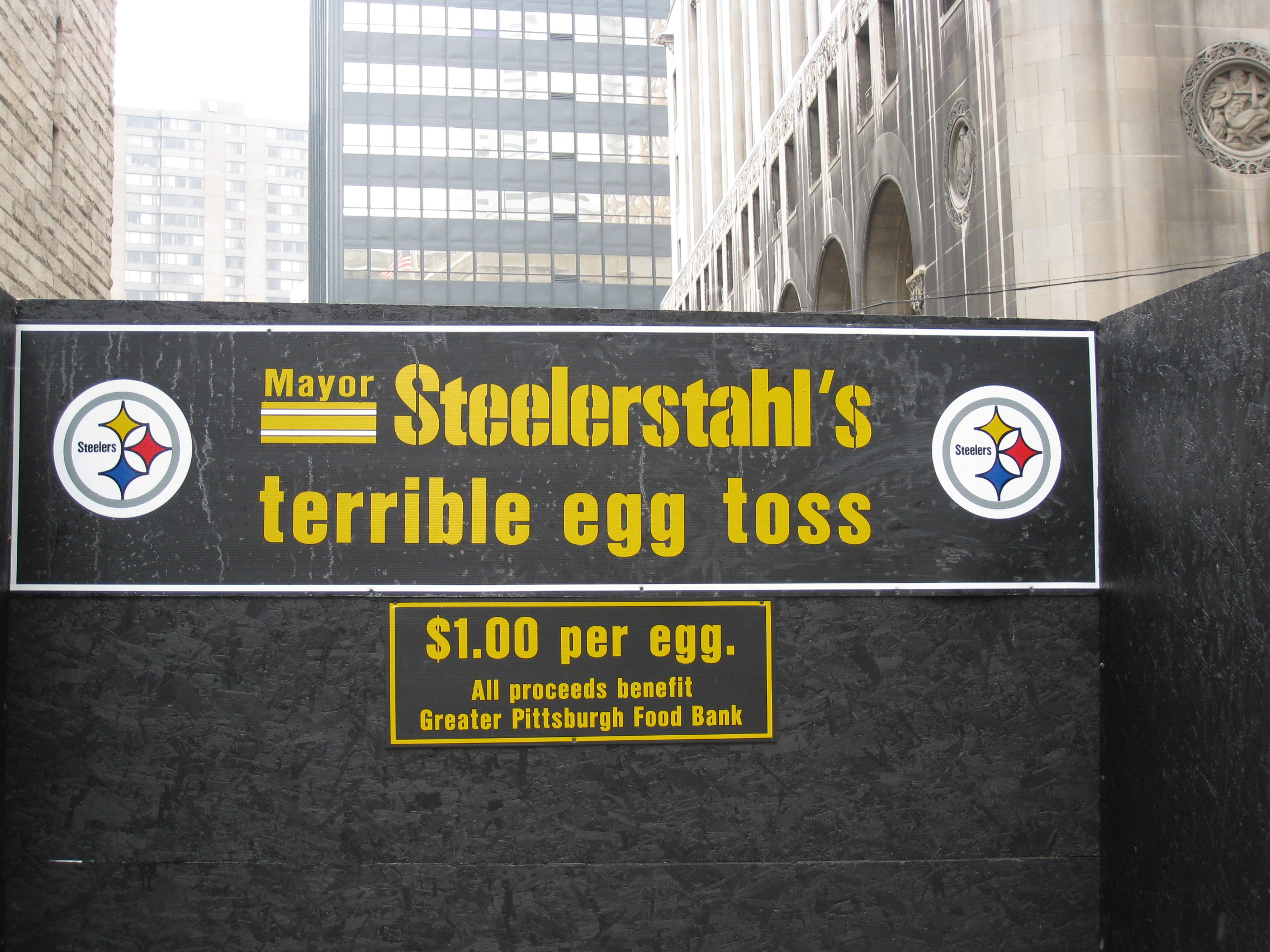
Luke Steelerstahl's egg toss for charity.

As a sign of support for the Pittsburgh Steelers' 2008 AFC Championship game against the Baltimore Ravens, Ravenstahl ceremonially changed his name to "Luke Steelerstahl" on January 14, 2009, in an ironic contrast to avoid being associated with the Steelers' opponents.

On November 23, 2009, Ravenstahl announced that he and his wife, Erin, had split and that he had moved out of the home that they had shared. He was quoted as saying "She doesn't like the limelight. She didn't like the fact that I became the mayor. She doesn't like the public nature of the position." On November 24, the mayor announced that he and his wife were "formally separating," but had no plans to officially file for divorce. On March 11, 2011, Erin Ravenstahl filed for divorce citing irreconcilable differences. Their divorce was finalized in late July 2011.

In 2012, Ravenstahl made a cameo appearance in the film The Dark Knight Rises as a member of the fictional football team the Rapid City Monuments.

== City Council ==
In April 2003, Ravenstahl ran for the Democratic nomination for the Pittsburgh City Council's District 1 seat against incumbent Barbara Burns. Ravenstahl defeated Burns with 54.5% of the vote. He credited his win to a combination of grassroots campaigning, a voter registration drive aimed at 18- to 25-year-olds, and a general dissatisfaction with Mayor Murphy. Ravenstahl was sworn in as the youngest member of City Council in Pittsburgh's history in January 2004. During his first few weeks on City Council, Ravenstahl's bill to reduce the newly imposed parking tax from 50% to 33% was vetoed by Mayor Tom Murphy, who was unwilling to balance the budget with $3 million from the Urban Redevelopment Authority.

=== City Council President ===
On December 6, 2005, Ravenstahl became the youngest President of the Pittsburgh City Council, when Gene Ricciardi (who had been elected district justice) stepped down from that post in a move seen as paving the way for ally Jim Motznik. However, Motznik was unable to secure the votes needed to win the presidency, and Ravenstahl emerged as a compromise candidate. He was re-elected unanimously at the re-organization meeting in January 2006, when the new members of the city council took office. One of his first major hurdles was to deal with the two state budget oversight boards. Per provisions in the city's charter, Ravenstahl ascended from the office of City Council President to Mayor on September 1, 2006, following the death of Mayor Bob O'Connor.

== Mayor of Pittsburgh ==
=== Elections ===
==== Accession to Mayor ====
Per provisions in the city's charter, Ravenstahl ascended from the office of City Council President to Mayor on September 1, 2006, following the death of Mayor Bob O'Connor. Due to ambiguous language in the city's charter, a controversy developed about how long Ravenstahl could temporarily serve as mayor before an election had to be held. Ravenstahl stated his desire to fulfill the remainder of O'Connor's term.

The charter refers to holding a new election when someone ascends to mayor through a vacancy but makes no mention of serving out the full term. It was unclear when the election could or should be held due to a confusing phrase that says the "vacancy in the mayor's office shall be filled at the next election permitted by law", yet not elaborating on what "permitted by law" means.

Ravenstahl instructed the city's legal department to quickly obtain a decision as to when the election should be held. On October 12, 2006, the Allegheny County Board of Elections decided unanimously that mayoral candidates would compete in the May 15, 2007, primary election followed by the November 6, 2007, general election, with the winner of the general election taking office immediately after the certification of the election results for a term ending in January 2010.

In his first official act as mayor, Ravenstahl ordered the city flag at all city locations to be flown at half staff and declared the city in a state of mourning. Ravenstahl and deputy mayor Yarone Zober had been coordinating city government since O'Connor's medical diagnosis in July 2006, which limited O'Connor to the confines of the University of Pittsburgh Medical Center, Shadyside, while O'Connor convalesced.

Media coverage of Ravenstahl has included a feature story in The New York Times, and an appearance on Late Show with David Letterman on September 14, 2006. Ravenstahl was concerned about how appropriate the coverage would appear in the wake of Bob O'Connor's death, but O'Connor's widow encouraged him to participate in the media coverage and continue O'Connor's work as a "cheerleader" for Pittsburgh.

After generally following O'Connor's agenda for the first few months of his term, Ravenstahl began to implement his own agenda, including pursuing a tax break for new housing in downtown, proposing college aid for city high school graduates, improving diversity in city government. He also began replacing O'Connor's staffers with his own. He also continued O'Connor's "311" city help line proposal, as well as the "Redd-Up" crews.

==== 2007 Special election ====
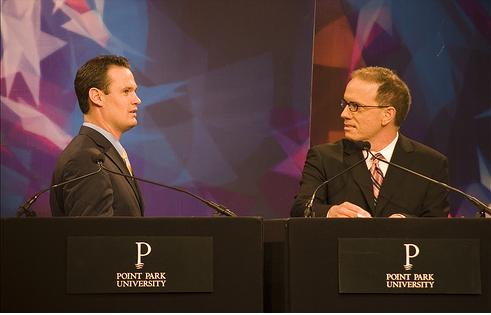
Ravenstahl debates Mark DeSantis at Point Park University on October 30, 2007.

Ravenstahl was unopposed on the ballot in the Democratic primary, held on May 17, 2007, to finish the remainder of Bob O'Connor's unfinished term. His chief opponent, Pittsburgh City Council member Bill Peduto, withdrew before the primary. His eventual Republican challenger, CEO and adjunct professor at Carnegie Mellon University Mark DeSantis did not appear on the Republican ballot, instead gaining the nomination through a write-in campaign.

DeSantis' candidacy garnered an unusual amount of interest in a city where no Republican had been elected mayor since the Great Depression. He was endorsed by Pittsburgh's two major newspapers, including the conservative-leaning Pittsburgh Tribune-Review and the then liberal-leaning Pittsburgh Post-Gazette. He was also endorsed by the city's police union and was profiled on Fox News.

Ravenstahl defeated DeSantis 63% to 35%.

==== 2009 Election ====
On May 19, 2009, Ravenstahl beat City Councilman Patrick Dowd and attorney Carmen Robinson to earn the Democratic nomination in the 2009 election. In the general election, he defeated his two independent competitors to earn a full term as mayor.

==== 2013 Election ====
On February 19, 2013, Ravenstahl announced his re-election bid for Pittsburgh Mayor. Just 11 days later, he withdrew from the race citing personal reasons. His announcement coincided with recent controversy regarding police credit union accounts. Democratic nominee Bill Peduto was elected mayor instead.

=== Initiatives and events ===
Ravenstahl played an important role in helping other local officials, including Allegheny County Chief Executive Dan Onorato and Pennsylvania Governor Ed Rendell negotiate with the Mario Lemieux-led Pittsburgh Penguins ownership group to keep the team in Pittsburgh.

==== Pittsburgh promise ====
On December 13, 2006, Mayor Ravenstahl launched an historic partnership between the City of Pittsburgh and the Pittsburgh Public Schools to develop 'The Pittsburgh Promise', a college access program and revitalization strategy for the City of Pittsburgh. The Pittsburgh Promise would make higher education achievable for all Pittsburgh Public Schools students regardless of need or income. It also would enhance the economic development of the City. By September 2011 the scholarship fund reached $12.5 million, with students eligible for $40,000 scholarships in two years if they maintain an attendance record of 90% and a minimum GPA of 2.5. The Pittsburgh Promise focuses on more than just help students move on to higher education, it also aims to tackle the City's declining public school enrollment and overall population. As of 2009, there was a growth in kindergarten enrollment and a shrinking percentage of declines in public school enrollment.

==== Tree give-away ====
Every year, Ravenstahl hosted a giveaway of free trees supported by the Shade Tree Commission, Tree Pittsburgh (formerly Friends of the Pittsburgh Urban Forest), and Eisler Nurseries.

Ravenstahl created the tree give away in support of TreeVitalize's goal of planting 20,000 trees by the year 2012.

==== G20 Comes to Pittsburgh ====
In 2009 the Obama Administration announced that the leaders of the world's largest economies would meet in Pittsburgh for the G20 Summit. Pittsburgh was chosen due to its transformation after the collapse of the Steel Industry with a renewed focus on environmental, economic, and technological innovation. "Pittsburgh boasts world class culture and President approved industries crucial for the growth of a nation". A key to the City's transformation has been collaboration amongst all sectors of society. Mayor Ravenstahl saw the G20 as an "opportunity to reintroduce the world to Pittsburgh – the new Pittsburgh, the Pittsburgh that is doing better than most and providing opportunities for folks. We really want to tell that story of that great turn around the president keeps talking about when he talks about Pittsburgh."

==== 2008 Democratic Presidential Primary in Pennsylvania ====
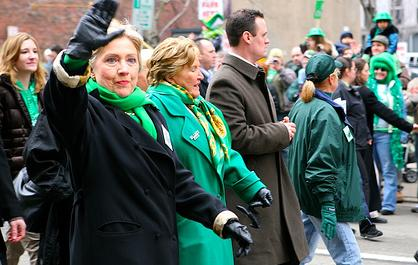
Ravenstahl marches with Hillary Clinton and Catherine Baker Knoll in Pittsburgh's St. Patrick's Day Parade in 2008

Ravenstahl and Allegheny County Chief Executive Dan Onorato endorsed Senator Hillary Clinton at a rally on March 14, 2008, at Soldiers and Sailors Memorial Hall. The double endorsements, coupled with endorsements from Governor Ed Rendell and Lt. Governor Catherine Baker Knoll, were seen as an indication of her strong support in Pennsylvania. Ravenstahl marched with Clinton the next day in Pittsburgh's annual St. Patrick's Day Parade.

==== Pittsburgh's Third Renaissance ====
Mayor Ravenstahl unveiled an 11-point plan to usher in Pittsburgh's Third Renaissance. It included resolving the long term costs of the City, encouraging healthcare and education industries, utilizing the best technology throughout the City, finishing riverfront development, enriching public education, connecting jobs with people, government reform through transparency and civic involvement, ensuring Pittsburgh's neighborhoods are clean and safe, greening the city, and promoting diversity.

Pittsburgh began to take on revitalization projects and initiatives including, Redd Up Zones, the North Shore Connector, Allegheny Riverfront Vision, Three PNC Plaza, the August Wilson Center, the Three Rivers Heritage Trail, and Brownfield site redevelopment that includes South Side Works, Washington's Landing, Pittsburgh's Technology Center, and Summerset at Frick Park. Programs such as ServePgh, Green Up, Taking Care of Business, Love Your Block, and the Civic Leadership Academy aid in the City's Third Renaissance. Ravenstahl also took on financial problems by sharing City's services and resources through purchasing in bulk with the County and other entities and merging the Housing Authority and the Police Department.

==== Market Square revitalization ====
Continuing to push Pittsburgh's third Renaissance, on October 26, 2010, Ravenstahl reopened the newly renovated Market Square. The $5 million improvement project was the culmination of several years of public process, made possible through the leadership, vision and financial contributions of The City of Pittsburgh, Urban Redevelopment Authority, Pittsburgh Downtown Partnership, Heinz Endowments, Richard King Mellon Foundation, Colcom Foundation, and the Hillman Foundation.

==== servePGH initiative ====
On September 10, 2009, Mayor Luke Ravenstahl pledged that the City of Pittsburgh would help the country achieve the goals of the Edward M. Kennedy Serve America Act by joining Mayor Bloomberg and 15 other mayors from across our nation to launch the Cities of Service coalition. By signing the Declaration of Service, Mayor Ravenstahl committed to develop a coordinated effort to utilize impact volunteerism as a significant municipal strategy to address local challenges.

The City of Pittsburgh's service blueprint, servePGH, seeks to leverage local human capital through impact volunteerism directed towards two of Mayor Ravenstahl's top priorities: neighborhood development and youth.

The new 'servePGH website' was created to connect volunteers with the high impact service initiatives described within servePGH, including:

- Love Your Block: Providing resources for volunteers to revitalize the City – block by block
- Redd Up Zone: Recruiting volunteers to remove litter and enhance the appearance, safety and cleanliness of Pittsburgh's streets
- Snow Angels: Matching volunteers with neighbors-in-need to shovel and de-ice their sidewalk during the winter months
- Mayor's Mentoring Initiative: The City of Pittsburgh's first-ever employee volunteer program, allowing City employees weekly leave time to mentor a middle-school student at a Pittsburgh Public School in partnership with the 'Be A 6th Grade Mentor' project.
- Civic Leadership Academy: A free program about local government created by Mayor Ravenstahl to foster more informed, effective and inspired community and civic leadership

== Criticism and controversies ==
=== Lemieux Celebrity Invitational Golf incident ===
Ravenstahl also created controversy for his participation in the $9,000-a-head Mario Lemieux Celebrity Invitational golf outing in June 2007. His participation was sponsored by the University of Pittsburgh Medical Center and the Pittsburgh Penguins. Members of the Pittsburgh city ethics board cited concerns about the "perception" that he might owe something to those who subsidized his participation. Republican mayoral candidate Mark DeSantis challenged Ravenstahl to sign an 'ethics pledge' in response to this incident. Six months later, mayor Ravenstahl introduced legislation that would have kept UPMC from paying any future taxes, and possibly some current taxes. Further complicating matters was that the mayor held this for weeks until the very last session of the 2007 City Council (2 of the 9 members were outgoing, and one had resigned under indictment).

=== Questionable use of police vehicle ===
Over the weekend of August 18, 2007, Ravenstahl used a Homeland Security–funded SUV to go to a Toby Keith concert at the Post-Gazette Pavilion. The Mayor's use of the GMC Yukon to travel to the concert may have violated the terms of the grant that funded the purchase of the vehicle. Responding to the allegations of impropriety, Ravenstahl said "I'm still going to continue to be who I'm going to be, and go to concerts like I always have, and go to have a drink with my wife in bars. That's what 27-year-olds do and I shouldn't be any different ... [I]'m not going to change my life to appease the media or appease somebody who wants me to be somebody I'm not. I think the fact that I'm 27 is something the city should embrace and it's something that I've embraced." Sgt. Mona Wallace was reportedly intimidated for reporting the incident to Public Safety Director Michael Huss. Police Chief Nate Harper began disciplinary measures against Wallace, but the reprimand was rescinded by Huss.

=== Banner-Gate ===
During the 2008 Stanley Cup playoff run of the Pittsburgh Penguins, the Penguins and Reebok proposed putting up 40-by-85-foot (12 by 26 m) advertisements on two downtown buildings. Due to controversy over a no-bid electronic billboard approved by director of the Urban Redevelopment Authority Pat Ford, there was a moratorium on new downtown signage. The Penguins and Reebok thought that they could not get new signage put up during this moratorium, and they contacted the mayor's chief of staff, Yarone Zober, to confirm this. Zober worked with City Council, including Council President Doug Shields to get this done and worked until 10 pm on a Friday night to finalize an agreement. Legislation was written to get the "holiday" banners put up but because of Victoria Day in Canada, Reebok could not get the banners printed in time. Ravenstahl blamed the inability to get the signs printed on City Council. Councilman Bill Peduto, a Penguins season ticket holder, went so far as to call this accusation a "bold faced lie". E-mails obtained by WTAE TV of Pittsburgh between City Bureaucrats, Councilmembers, the Penguins and the Mayor's office supported Peduto's claims.

=== Police Credit Union accounts ===
In February 2013, both the FBI and IRS subpoenaed boxes full of documents from police headquarters and the independently run police credit union concerning thousands of deposits and withdrawals of tax payer money from non-authorized accounts, though at least one account dates back to 2004, prior to Mayor Ravenstahl's tenure, and as yet no allegations have been made against Mayor Ravenstahl.

On February 21, 2013, Mayor Ravenstahl admitted that members of his police protection unit also drew from the non-authorized credit union accounts under investigation by the FBI and IRS, though neither he nor the officers were aware those credit cards were tied to the accounts or were unauthorized by the city controller's office.

=== Other incidents ===
- On August 27, 2008, Urban Redevelopment Authority Executive Director Pat Ford resigned in a tersely worded letter to Ravenstahl and Chief of Staff Yarone Zober. The letter claims that the Ravenstahl administration is characterized by a "culture of deception and corruption." When asked to substantiate these rumors of corruption, Ford lawyer Lawrence Fisher replied: "the way contracts are supposed to be awarded to the lowest responsible bidder, and the way contributions have been made to the mayor, I think it's self-evident". Specifically, Mr. Fisher referred to the recent awarding of a URA contract to the highest of three bidders, contrary to Pennsylvania state law that states such contracts must be awarded to the "lowest responsible bidder".

In addition to the claims of corruption, Ford called Ravenstahl's "a failed administration" that forced him "to serve as a scapegoat for the inappropriate affairs and activities of others". Councilman William Peduto issued a statement that the contracting issue "goes much further than Pat Ford. Pittsburgh is no longer a city that is open for business; Pittsburgh is a city for sale."

- In December 2006, Matthew McTish, president of McTish, Kunkel & Associates, gave $10,000 to Ravenstahl's campaign. In August 2007, McTish, Kinkel & Associates was awarded a $525,000 contract by the Urban Redevelopment Authority despite being the highest of three bidders. That contract, and other URA dealings, are currently under investigation by the City Controller.
- In February 2009, Ravenstahl was criticized for having spent $252,000 of state grant money on 250 trash receptacles bearing his name. The criticism for each trash can, costing over $1,000 a piece, was that (1) the mayor overpaid for them and (2) the display of his name equated into using taxpayer money for publicity purposes. Because of the upcoming Pittsburgh mayoral election (Which Ravenstahl then dropped out of), numerous people cited a conflict of interest since the new trash had Ravenstahl's name on them while he is running for reelection. However, under the Peduto Administration, the trash cans and all other public places will have all public officials names stripped from them. The current administration also banned placing any name of a public official on any public space.
- On September 25 and 26, 2009, the city of Pittsburgh hosted the G20 Summit. During the event, over 190 people were arrested, many of whom were students. As a result of what many felt was an excessive police presence in response to protesters, many blamed Ravenstahl and Allegheny County Chief Executive Dan Onorato, who were in charge of preparing for the G-20 event.
- On November 10, 2009, Ravenstahl introduced the proposed budget to the City Council, which included a 1% "privilege" tax on student tuition. Students attending the Community College of Allegheny County, which has an annual tuition of $2,700, would be required under the proposed plan to pay a tax of $27 while students attending the University of Pittsburgh, which has an annual in-state tuition cost of $13,500, would have to pay $135. Students attending Carnegie Mellon University, which has an annual tuition rate of over $40,000, would be required to pay $400 a year despite the fact that only 20% of CMU students are in-state students and thus permanent residents of the state of Pennsylvania. Students have been critical of the proposed tax, arguing that it unfairly burdens students who attend universities with higher tuition rates. Also included in the tax were the downtown universities of Carlow University, Duquesne University, Chatham University, and Point Park University. Along with the trade schools such as Pittsburgh Technical Institute and Kaplan, Inc. and theological seminaries that included Pittsburgh Theological Seminary and Reformed Presbyterian Theological Seminary. Arts and culinary schools of downtown Pittsburgh were also targeted for the tax which included Art Institute of Pittsburgh, Pennsylvania Culinary Institute, and Pittsburgh Filmmakers' School of Film, Photography, and Digital Media.

== Post-mayoral career ==
In 2015, Ravenstahl joined Peoples Natural Gas, and was named the company's vice president of sales and marketing in 2017.

== Electoral history ==
Pittsburgh mayoral special election, 2007
Party	Candidate	Votes	%
Democratic	Luke Ravenstahl	43,557	63.2
Republican	Mark DeSantis	24,025	34.9
Socialist Workers	Ryan Scott	550	0.7
Libertarian	Tony Olivia	504	0.7
Total votes		68,636	100

Pittsburgh mayoral election, 2009
Party	Candidate	Votes	%
Democratic	Luke Ravenstahl	28,528	55.22
Independent	Franco "Doc" Harris	13,060	25.28
Independent	Kevin Acklin	9,903	19.17
Total votes		51,491	100

== See also ==
- City of Pittsburgh
- Pittsburgh Public Schools
- Youth politics

Political offices
Preceded by Bob O'Connor	Mayor of Pittsburgh; 2006–2014	Succeeded by Bill Peduto
Pittsburgh City Council
Preceded by Gene Ricciardi	President of the Pittsburgh City Council; 2005–2006	Succeeded by Doug Shields
Preceded by Barbara Burns	Member of the Pittsburgh City Council from the 1st District; 2004–2006	Succeeded by Darlene Harris
