= Dan Onorato =

American politician from Pennsylvania

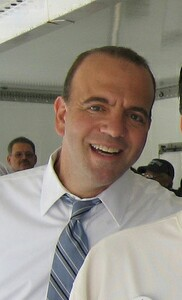

Chief Executive of Allegheny County
- In office January 2, 2004 – January 3, 2012
- Preceded by: Jim Roddey
- Succeeded by: Rich Fitzgerald

Controller of Allegheny County
- In office January 4, 2000 – January 2, 2004
- Preceded by: Frank Lucchino
- Succeeded by: Mark Flaherty

Member of the Pittsburgh City Council from the 1st district
- In office January 6, 1992 – January 4, 2000
- Preceded by: Bernard Regan
- Succeeded by: Barbara Burns

Personal details
- Born: February 5, 1961 (age 65) Pittsburgh, Pennsylvania, U.S.
- Party: Democratic
- Education: Pennsylvania State University, University Park (BS); University of Pittsburgh (JD)

Daniel Onorato (born February 5, 1961) is an American Democratic politician from the state of Pennsylvania. He served as the chief executive of Allegheny County from 2004 to 2012, and in 2010, he was the Democratic nominee for governor. He lost to State Attorney General Tom Corbett in the general election. Onorato is currently the chief corporate affairs officer at Highmark Health.

== Early life, education and family ==
A life-long resident of Allegheny County, Onorato attended Penn State University, where he earned a bachelor's degree in accounting in 1983. He worked several years as a Certified Public Accountant (CPA) before continuing his education at the University of Pittsburgh School of Law, earning a Juris Doctor in 1989. Onorato and his wife Shelly reside in Pittsburgh's Brighton Heights neighborhood with their children: Kate, Emily, and Danny. In 2012, Onorato began working for Highmark, where he is the vice president of corporate communications and external affairs.

== Political career ==
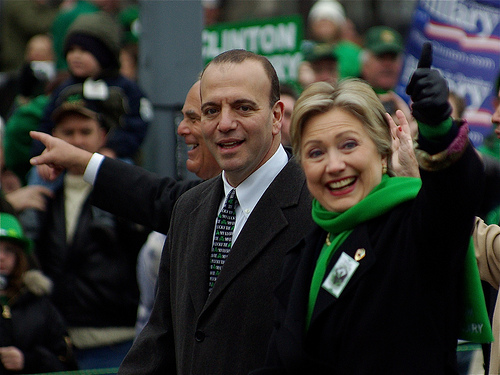
Onorato marches with Senator Hillary Clinton in Pittsburgh's 2008 St. Patrick's Day Parade.

Onorato practiced as a private attorney until he was elected to the Pittsburgh City Council in 1991, when he defeated District 1 incumbent Bernard J. Regan in the primary election. He served two terms on the council before being elected Allegheny County Controller in 2000. In 2003, he defeated Jim Roddey for the position of Allegheny County executive. He was named runner up for the 2003 Politician of the Year by the political website PoliticsPA, who noted his youthful energy and his fundraising power.

=== Allegheny County drink tax controversy ===
In late 2007 Allegheny County received permission from the Pennsylvania General Assembly to pursue increased taxation of poured alcohol and rental cars to subsidize the Port Authority of Allegheny County. Members of the Allegheny County Council and Onorato believed that such a tax was preferable to increasing county property taxes. After the 10% tax on poured alcohol passed, Allegheny County bar and restaurant owners protested the new tax, claiming that it would hurt that business. Courts threw out a lawsuit by bar and restaurant owners challenging the legality of the drink tax, but the litigants sought a referendum overturning the tax in the November 2008 general election. Onorato subsequently withheld the funds raised by the drink tax from the Port Authority, demanding that the transit agency first restructure its labor costs.

=== 2008 presidential election ===
He announced his endorsement of Senator Hillary Clinton in her 2008 presidential bid on March 14, 2008, saying, "Hillary Clinton has the experience and the determination to clean up the mess in Washington and deliver results."

=== 2010 gubernatorial campaign ===
Onorato won the Democratic nomination in the 2010 election for Governor of Pennsylvania on May 18, 2010. Onorato had more than $4 million for a campaign left over from his re-election bid. He also received media attention when the G-20 Summit was held in Pittsburgh. He defeated State Senator Anthony Williams, Auditor General Jack Wagner, and Montgomery County Commissioner Joe Hoeffel. He was defeated by Republican State Attorney General Tom Corbett in the general election with 45.5% to 54.5% of the vote, and lost his home county.

A large part of his loss resulted from his role in US Airways leaving Pittsburgh for Charlotte, leading to a direct loss of 12,000 jobs in the Pittsburgh area, and an indirect loss estimate of 50,000 jobs. The County's taxation of passengers to pay down airport debt under Onorato's lead as County Executive left US Airways in a difficult competitive pricing disadvantage compared to other airlines and hubs. Onorato called US Airways CEO Doug Parker's 'bluff' to utilize a contractual agreement to cancel leases, and US Airways ultimately wound down hub operations at the airport.

== See also ==
- Allegheny County, Pennsylvania

Political offices
Preceded by Jim Roddey	Executive of Allegheny County; 2004–2012	Succeeded by Rich Fitzgerald
Party political offices
Preceded by Ed Rendell	Democratic nominee for Governor of Pennsylvania; 2010	Succeeded by Tom Wolf
