= 2025 Pittsburgh mayoral election =

Mayoral election in Pennsylvania, US

- November 4, 2025
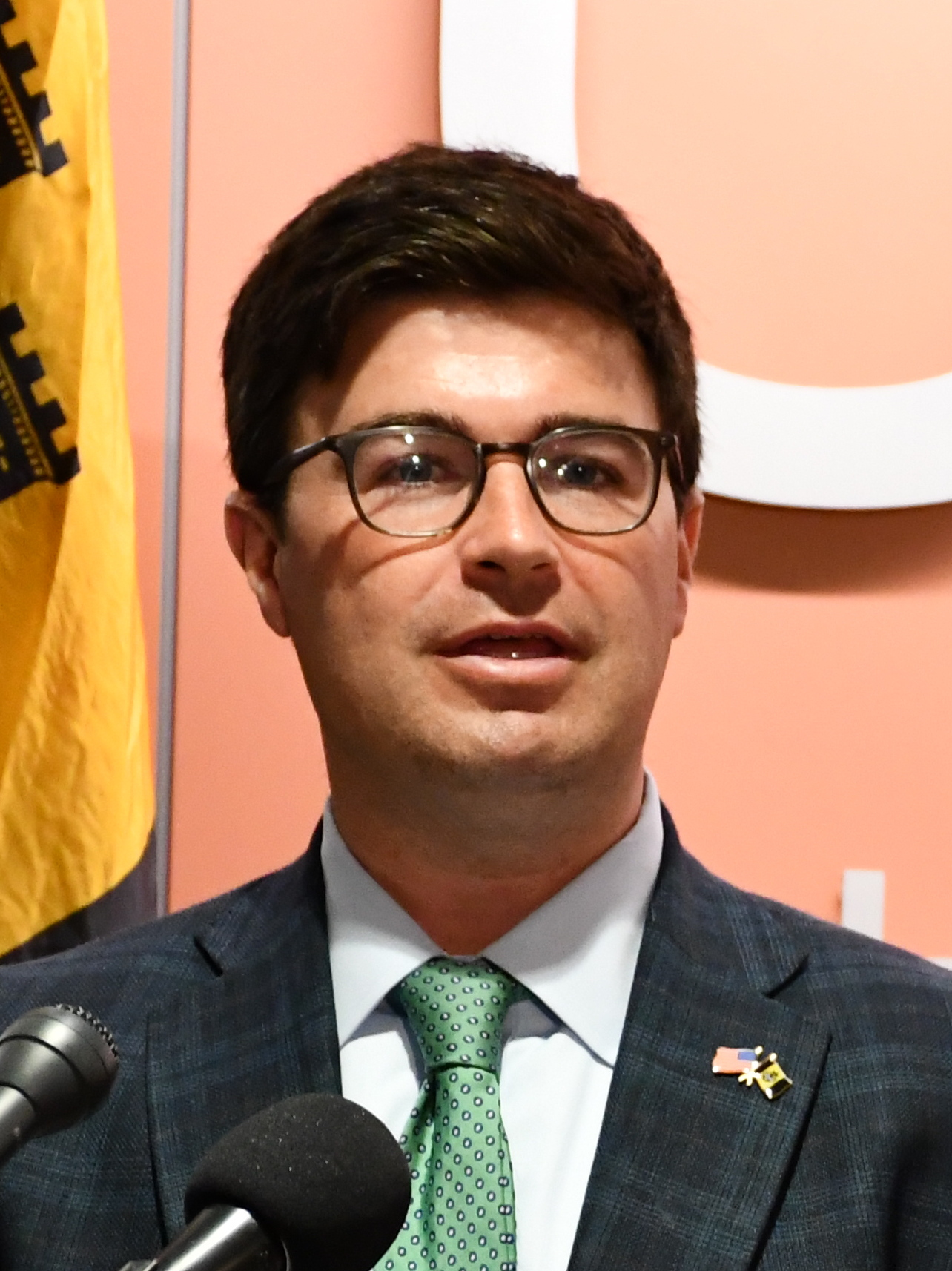

Candidate	Corey O'Connor	Tony Moreno
Party	Democratic	Republican
Popular vote	80,738	11,463
Percentage	85.57%	12.15%
- Ward results O'Connor: 60–70% 70–80% 80–90% >90%
Mayor before election
Ed Gainey
Democratic
Elected mayor
Corey O'Connor
Democratic

The 2025 Pittsburgh mayoral election was held on November 4, 2025, with a primary election held on May 20, 2025. Incumbent Democratic mayor Ed Gainey ran for re-election to a second term as mayor but lost in the Democratic primary to challenger Corey O'Connor, who subsequently won the general election.

== Background ==
Due to the Democratic Party's dominance in Pittsburgh, with no Republican elected mayor since 1929, the Democratic primary has long been the main ideological contest in municipal politics. In 2021, Ed Gainey, a progressive, comfortably defeated moderate incumbent Bill Peduto in the primary and went on to win 70.8% of the vote against Republican Tony Moreno in the general election. Gainey's mayoralty, however, proved controversial. His administration was criticized for its handling of the city budget and crime and for its position on the Israeli-Palestinian conflict in the context of the Gaza War; Pittsburgh has a substantial and politically engaged Jewish population, while Gainey was perceived as pro-Palestinian. As such, Gainey was seen as vulnerable to a primary challenge from moderate city councilman Corey O'Connor. Due, again, to Pittsburgh's heavily Democratic lean, O'Connor was favored to win the general election if he triumphed in the primary.

== Democratic primary ==
=== Candidates ===
==== Nominee ====
- Corey O'Connor, Allegheny County Controller (2022–present), former Pittsburgh city councilor (2012–2022), and son of former mayor Bob O'Connor

==== Defeated in primary ====
- Ed Gainey, incumbent mayor

=== Endorsements ===
Ed Gainey

U.S. representatives

- Summer Lee, U.S. Representative from Pennsylvania's 12th congressional district (2023–present)

State representatives

- Aerion Abney, 19th district (2022–present)
- Jessica Benham, 36th district (2021–present)
- Emily Kinkead, 20th district (2021–present)
- La'Tasha Mayes, 24th district (2023–present)

County officials

- Bethany Hallam, at-large Allegheny County Councilor (2020–present)
- Sara Innamorato, Allegheny County Executive (2024–present)
- Bob Palmosina, Allegheny County Councilor from the 12th district (2018–present)

Pittsburgh city councilors

- Deb Gross, 7th district (2014–present)
- Daniel Lavelle, 6th district (2010–present)
- Khari Mosley, 9th district (2024–present)
- Barb Warwick, 5th district (2022–present)

Other local officials

- Ashley Comans, at-large (2017–present) vice president of the Wilkinsburg School District Board of Directors (2023–present)
- Dontae Comans, mayor of Wilkinsburg (2022–present)
- Devon Taliaferro, Pittsburgh Public Schools board director from the 2nd district (2019–present)
- Sylvia Wilson, Pittsburgh Public Schools board director from the 1st district (2013–present)

Labor unions

- International Association of Fire Fighters Local 1
- IUOE Local 66
- SEIU Local 668, SEIU 32BJ, and SEIU Healthcare Pennsylvania
- Pittsburgh AFT Local 400
- UNITE HERE Local 57
- UE Eastern Region and Locals 506 and 618
- UFCW Local 1776
- United Steelworkers District 10
- Workers United Pennsylvania Joint Board

Organizations

- Carnegie Mellon University College Democrats
- Clean Water Action Pennsylvania
- League of Conservation Voters of Pennsylvania
- NextGen PAC
- Steel City Stonewall Democrats

Political parties

- Pennsylvania Working Families Party

Newspaper

- New Pittsburgh Courier
Corey O'Connor

State legislators

- Wayne Fontana, SD-42 (2005–present)
- Dan Frankel, HD-23 (1998–present)

County officials

- DeWitt Walton, Allegheny County Councilor from the 10th district (2015–present)

Pittsburgh mayors

- Thomas J. Murphy Jr., mayor of Pittsburgh (1994-2006)

Pittsburgh city councilors

- Ricky Burgess, 9th district (2008–2024)
- Robert Charland, 3rd district (2024–present)
- Anthony Coghill, 4th district (2018–present)
- Theresa Kail-Smith, 2nd district (2009–present)
- Bruce Kraus, 3rd district (2008–2024)
- Erika Strassburger, 8th district (2018–present)
- Bobby Wilson, 1st district (2020–present)

Labor unions

- Fraternal Association of Professional Paramedics Local 1 (Note: Pittsburgh's EMS Union is affiliated with AFL-CIO.)
- International Association of Bridge, Structural, Ornamental and Reinforcing Iron Workers Local 3
- IBB Local 154
- Teamsters Locals 205 and 249
- IUBAC Local 9
- IUPAT District 57
- LIUNA - Pennsylvania District Council
- Pittsburgh Building Trades Council
- SMWIA Local 12
- United Association Locals 27, 188, and 449

Party chapters

- Allegheny County Democratic Committee

Organizations

- University of Pittsburgh College Democrats
- Young Democrats of Allegheny County
Declined to endorse

Labor unions

- Allegheny/Fayette AFL-CIO

=== Polling ===
Poll source	Date(s) administered	Sample size (Note: Key: A – all adults RV – registered voters LV – likely voters V – unclear)	Margin of error	Ed Gainey	Corey O'Connor	Undecided
Upswing Research & Strategy (D) (Note: Poll sponsored by Gainey's campaign)	March 2025	402 (LV)	± 4.2%	49%	42%	9%
Lake Research Partners (D) (Note: Poll sponsored by O'Connor's campaign)	March 2025	500 (LV)	–	32%	50%	18%
Lake Research Partners (D)	February 6–11, 2025	500 (LV)	–	35%	47%	16%

=== Results ===
Primary results by ward O'Connor: 50%–60%; 60%–70%; 70%–80%; Gainey: 50%–60%; 60%–70%; 70%–80%; 80%–90%

Democratic primary results
Party	Candidate	Votes	%
Democratic	Corey O'Connor	31,666	52.59
Democratic	Ed Gainey (incumbent)	28,355	47.09
Write-in		189	0.31
Total votes		60,210	100.0

== Republican primary ==
=== Candidates ===
==== Nominee ====
- Tony Moreno, retired police officer and nominee for mayor in 2021

==== Defeated in primary ====
- Thomas West, clothing store owner

=== Results ===
Republican primary results
Party	Candidate	Votes	%
Republican	Tony Moreno	2,911	62.00
Republican	Thomas West	1,247	26.56
Write-in		537	11.44
Total votes		4,695	100.0

== General election ==
=== Results ===
2025 Pittsburgh mayoral election
Party	Candidate	Votes	%
Democratic	Corey O'Connor	80,738	85.57
Republican	Tony Moreno	11,463	12.15
Write-in		2,154	2.28
Total votes		94,355	100.0

== Notes ==
Partisan clients
