= Martell Covington =

American politician

Member of the Pennsylvania House of Representatives from the 24th district
- In office April 26, 2022 – January 3, 2023
- Preceded by: Ed Gainey
- Succeeded by: La'Tasha Mayes

Personal details
- Born: Pittsburgh, Pennsylvania
- Party: Democratic
- Education: Howard University (BBA)
- Website: Legislature website

Martell Covington is an American politician who served as a Democratic member in the Pennsylvania House of Representatives from April 2022 - January 2023, representing the 24th district in Allegheny County. He won a 2022 special election to succeed Ed Gainey, who was elected Mayor of Pittsburgh in 2021. He was defeated in the Democratic primary election for the full-term by La'Tasha Mayes on May 17, 2023.

== Early life and education ==
Covington is from Homewood, a neighborhood of Pittsburgh. For more than 12 years, he worked in various roles for the Community Empowerment Association, a social service organization on the east side of Pittsburgh, eventually becoming the Assistant Director of Youth & Family Services. He is currently chair of its board of directors. Covington served as a legislative aide to state Senate Democratic Leader Jay Costa, where he worked on critical developments for the Pittsburgh region, including serving as a leadership team member for the Oakland Business Improvement District’s Strategic Plan and a technical advisor for the Oakland Plan. In 2021, he was elected to serve as Vice President for the Young Democrats of Allegheny County. Covington also is part of the Black Equity Coalition's Policy Team. He graduated from Central Catholic High School in Pittsburgh and Howard University.

== Pennsylvania House of Representatives ==
Covington worked as an aide to Jay Costa, a member of the Pennsylvania Senate. The Allegheny County Democratic Committee nominated Covington for an April 2022 special election to succeed Ed Gainey in the Pennsylvania House, he won with . He was sworn in on April 26, 2022. He lost renomination to La'Tasha Mayes in the Democratic primary on May 17, 2022.

== Electoral history ==
2022 Pennsylvania House of Representatives, District 24 Democratic primary Preliminary results
Party	Candidate	Votes	%
Democratic	La'Tasha Mayes	5,241	46.72
Democratic	Martell Covington (incumbent)	4,239	37.79
Democratic	Randall Taylor	1,737	15.49
Total votes		11,217	100%

2022 Pennsylvania House of Representatives, District 24 special election Preliminary results
Party	Candidate	Votes	%
Democratic	Martell Covington	5,101	92.95
Republican	Todd Elliott Koger	313	5.70
Write-in		74	1.35
Total votes		5,488	100%
Democratic hold			
