= La'Tasha Mayes =

American activist and politician

Member of the Pennsylvania House of Representatives from the 24th district
- Incumbent
- Assumed office January 3, 2023
- Preceded by: Martell Covington

Personal details
- Born: La'Tasha Denise Mayes Philadelphia, Pennsylvania, US
- Party: Democratic
- Education: University of Pittsburgh (BS); Heinz College, Carnegie Mellon University (MS)

La'Tasha Mayes is an American activist and politician who is a member of the Pennsylvania House of Representatives. A member of the Democratic Party, she represents the 24th district, which contains parts of Pittsburgh.

== Early life and education ==
Mayes was born and raised in West Philadelphia, Pennsylvania. She graduated from the University of Pittsburgh in 2003 with a Bachelor of Science degree in business administration. She then attended Heinz College at Carnegie Mellon University, where she graduated with a Master of Science degree in public policy and management in 2005.

== Early career ==
Mayes is an activist and community organizer for reproductive justice. In 2004, Mayes co-founded New Voices for Reproductive Justice, an intersectional advocacy group emphasizing the reproductive health and well-being of Black women and LGBT people in Pennsylvania and Ohio, and served as its president and executive director until 2022. The organization won a lawsuit in 2015 which compelled the Pennsylvania Department of Human Services to expand Medicaid coverage for 74,415 low-income women in Pennsylvania. In 2022, deeming the result of the gubernatorial election critical to protecting abortion rights in Pennsylvania, the group endorsed and helped to organize voters for Democratic nominee Josh Shapiro.

In 2008, New Voices for Reproductive Justice was among the leading groups to lobby for the creation of human relations commissions at the county and state levels to enforce statutes of non-discrimination on the basis of gender identity and sexual orientation. When Allegheny County enacted such legislation and created such a commission in 2009, Mayes was appointed to be vice chair of the Allegheny County Human Relations Commission. In 2022, Mayes identified the strengthening of the provisions of the Pennsylvania Human Relations Act to a full LGBT non-discrimination ordinance as a campaign priority in her run for the Pennsylvania House of Representatives.

In 2015, Mayes ran for the Pittsburgh City Council in the 7th district, losing the Democratic primary to incumbent Deborah Gross.

== Pennsylvania House of Representatives ==
=== Elections ===
==== 2022 ====
On January 19, 2022, Mayes announced that she would run for the Pennsylvania House of Representatives from the 24th district, which contains parts of Pittsburgh. The seat was vacated midway through the term by Rep. Ed Gainey, who had been elected mayor of Pittsburgh in 2021. In the special election to succeed him, the Democratic nominee was chosen on February 5 by a vote of local party committee members; Martell Covington, a former legislative aide to state senator Jay Costa, won a plurality of the committee vote and was thus nominated, while Mayes placed second out of six candidates. Covington won the special election on April 5 and was seated on April 26.

Subsequently, Mayes ran again for the seat in the regular Democratic primary on May 17 for the full term that would begin in 2023. In her announcement, she said that she was motivated to run to improve community health in the district, with a particular focus on addressing inequities in healthcare that were exacerbated by the COVID-19 pandemic. Mayes also asserted that her extensive experience in the field of reproductive justice was relevant in an atmosphere of political threats to abortion access and comprehensive maternal healthcare, arguing that she would be the strongest candidate to protect abortion rights in Pennsylvania if Roe v. Wade would be overturned (which indeed occurred in June 2022 in the U.S. Supreme Court decision Dobbs v. Jackson Women's Health Organization).

In the Democratic primary, Mayes defeated incumbent Rep. Covington by a margin of 46% to 38%, while a third candidate, Randall Taylor, garnered 16%. Political observers noted that Mayes won despite Covington again receiving the endorsement of the county Democratic committee, and drew comparisons to Jessica Benham and Summer Lee, two other progressive insurgent candidates who won their elections without the county party endorsement.

Mayes won the general election unopposed on November 8.

=== Committee assignments ===
- Appropriations
- Environmental Resources and Energy
- Health
- Judiciary

=== Tenure ===
Upon taking office, Mayes became the first lesbian state legislator in the history of Pennsylvania.

== Personal life ==
Mayes lives in Pittsburgh with her partner and daughter. She is a lesbian.

== Electoral history ==
Pittsburgh City Council, 7th district, 2015
Party	Candidate	Votes	%
Democratic primary election
Democratic	Deborah Gross	2,597	64.46%
Democratic	La'Tasha Mayes	1,417	35.17%
Write-in		15	0.37%
Total votes		4,029	100.00%
General election
Democratic	Deborah Gross	5,736	97.55%
Write-in		144	2.45%
Total votes		5,880	100.00%
Democratic hold			

Pennsylvania House of Representatives, 24th district, 2022 (special)
Party	Candidate	Votes	%
Democratic committee vote
Democratic	Martell Covington	40	39.60%
Democratic	La'Tasha Mayes	24	23.76%
Democratic	Randall Taylor	16	15.84%
Democratic	NaTisha Washington	10	9.90%
Democratic	Lamar Blackwell	6	5.94%
Democratic	Will Anderson	5	4.95%
Total votes		101	100.00%
General election
Democratic	Martell Covington	5,054	92.96%
Republican	Todd Elliott Koger	311	5.72%
Write-in		72	1.32%
Total votes		5,437	100.00%
Democratic hold			

Pennsylvania House of Representatives, 24th district, 2022 (regular)
Party	Candidate	Votes	%
Democratic primary election
Democratic	La'Tasha Mayes	5,360	46.21%
Democratic	Martell Covington (incumbent)	4,416	38.07%
Democratic	Randall Taylor	1,824	15.72%
Total votes		11,600	100.00%
General election
Democratic	La'Tasha Mayes	21,036	100.00%
Total votes		21,036	100.00%
Democratic hold			

Pennsylvania House of Representatives
Preceded by Martell Covington	Member of the Pennsylvania House of Representatives from the 24th district 2023–present	Incumbent
