= Jake Wheatley =

American politician

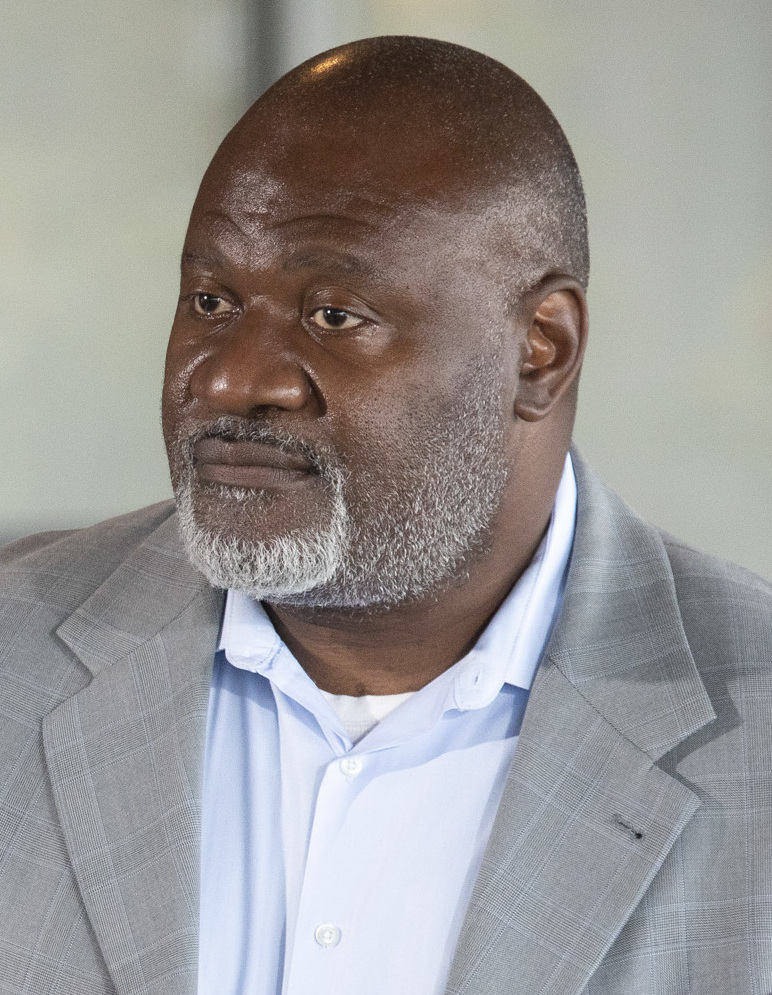

Member of the Pennsylvania House of Representatives from the 19th district
- In office January 7, 2003 – January 31, 2022
- Preceded by: William Russell Robinson
- Succeeded by: Aerion Abney

Personal details
- Born: December 23, 1971 (age 54)
- Party: Democratic
- Education: North Carolina A&T State University (BA); University of Pittsburgh (MPA)

Military service
- Allegiance: United States
- Branch/service: United States Marine Corps
- Years of service: 1989 — 1992
- Battles/wars: Gulf War
- Awards: Combat Action Ribbon; Southwest Asia Service Medal; National Defense Service Medal

Jake Wheatley Jr. is an American politician who served as a member of the Pennsylvania House of Representatives from the 19th district, covering the Hill District, North Side, South Side, Allentown, Hazelwood, Downtown Pittsburgh, The Bluff, Knoxville, Beltzhoover, Manchester, Arlington, Arlington Heights, and North, South and West Oakland.

== Early life and education ==
Wheatley graduated with a bachelor's degree in Political Science from North Carolina A&T State University and the University of Pittsburgh with a Masters in Public Administration.

As a member of the United States Marine Corps, Wheatley served in Operation Desert Storm. He was awarded with the Combat Action Ribbon, National Defense Service Medal and Southwest Asia Service Medal.

== Career ==
From 1998 to 2000, Wheatley served as executive assistant to Sala Udin, a member of the Pittsburgh City Council. In 2002, Wheatley ran for the 19th Legislative District Allegheny County. Seven-term incumbent Bill Robinson tried to derail the Wheatley campaign by revealing a 'youthful indiscretion' that was later expunged from Wheatley's record. In 2012, Wheatley was arrested on charges of simple assault related to an altercation with his fiancée over childcare expenses. The charges were later withdrawn and Wheatley apologized to his constituents.

Wheatley currently serves as the Majority Chairman of the Appropriations Subcommittee on Education (and is only the second first-term legislator to serve on that committee) as well as the majority Chairman of the Health and Human Services Subcommittee on Health. In addition, he serves as a member of the Education and Transportation committees, Vice Chair for the Pennsylvania Legislative Black Caucus and as the Vice Chair for the Democratic Policy Committee. He also serves as a Deputy Majority Whip for the House Democratic Caucus. Wheatley is a member of the Pennsylvania Legislative Black Caucus.

Wheatley entered the race for the Democratic nomination for Mayor of Pittsburgh in the 2013 election in early March of that year, but lost the primary election, coming in third behind winner Bill Peduto and runner-up Jack Wagner.

Wheatley became Chief of Staff for Pittsburgh mayor Ed Gainey in February 2022.

=== Committee assignments ===
- Professional Licensure, Democratic Chair
