= Aerion Abney =

American politician

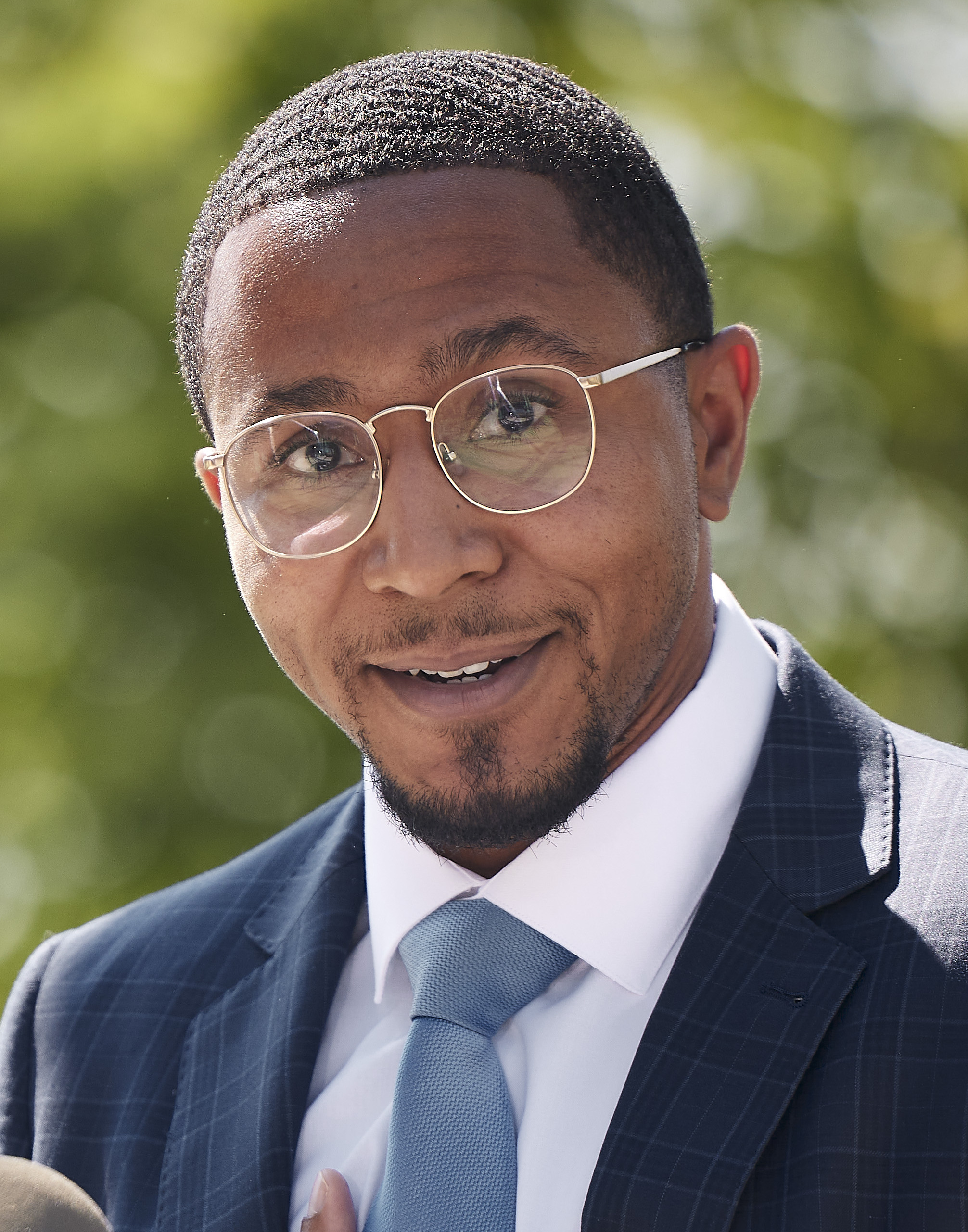

Member of the Pennsylvania House of Representatives from the 19th district
- Incumbent
- Assumed office April 26, 2022
- Preceded by: Jake Wheatley

Personal details
- Born: Aerion Andrew Abney; May 23, 1988 (age 38) Philadelphia, Pennsylvania, U.S.
- Party: Democratic
- Spouse: Tamara Abney
- Children: 2
- Education: University of Pittsburgh (BA, MSW)
- Website: House website

Aerion Andrew Abney is an American politician who has served in the Pennsylvania House of Representatives since 2022. A member of the Democratic Party, he represents the 19th district, which contains parts of Pittsburgh.

Before his election to the state legislature, Abney was a social worker and community activist involved in local politics. He twice ran unsuccessfully to unseat incumbent state representative Jake Wheatley. When Wheatley resigned in 2022 to become chief of staff to Pittsburgh's newly-elected mayor Ed Gainey, Abney won the special election to succeed him.

== Early life and education ==
Abney was raised in Philadelphia, Pennsylvania, and attended Cardinal O'Hara High School. He then attended the University of Pittsburgh, earning a Bachelor of Arts degree in communications in 2010 and a Master of Social Work degree from the university's School of Social Work in 2012.

== Pennsylvania House of Representatives (2022–present) ==
=== Elections ===
==== 2016 ====
Abney first ran for the 19th district seat in the Pennsylvania House of Representatives in 2016, but he withdrew before facing incumbent Rep. Jake Wheatley in the primary.

==== 2018 ====
In 2018, Abney ran against Wheatley, who had held the seat since 2003. He criticized Wheatley for a lack of "political will" to push for the construction of new affordable housing units, especially in the Hill District, a historically African-American neighborhood of Pittsburgh. He lost the Democratic primary to Wheatley by a margin of 367 votes out of 5,777 total votes, or about 6 percentage points.

==== 2020 ====
In 2020, Abney ran in a rematch against Wheatley. Abney campaigned on the promise that he would advocate more strongly for the residents of the Hill District. He pointed to various statistics showing a decline in quality of life for residents of the Hill despite Wheatley's efforts. Indeed, the neighborhood had been a food desert since 2018, when its only grocery store had closed after just five years of operation; the store had received incentives upon opening in 2013 from the state's Fresh Food Financing Initiative targeting food deserts. Abney was again defeated, this time by a margin of 2,501 votes out of 10,467 total votes, or about 24 percentage points.

==== 2022 (special) ====
In 2022, Abney was widely expected to challenge Wheatley yet again. However, Wheatley resigned on January 31, 2022, midway through his 10th term, to become chief of staff to Ed Gainey, who was elected mayor of Pittsburgh in 2021. In the special election to succeed him, Abney won the Democratic nomination on February 10 by a vote of local Democratic committee members; he tied Rev. Glenn Grayson in the balloting with each receiving the support of 55 members, so the nomination was decided by drawing lots.

Abney ran unopposed in the special general election on April 5; he received 2,643 votes, or about 87% of the total with the remaining votes scattered among write-in candidates. Following his victory, he will be sworn in to the Pennsylvania House of Representatives to finish Wheatley's term.

==== 2022 (regular) ====
In the regular Democratic primary on May 17 for the next two-year term, Abney will face Rev. Glenn Grayson in a rematch.

=== Committee assignments ===
For the 2025-2026 Session, Abney sits on the following committees:

- Appropriations
  - Subcommittee on Health & Human Services Chair
- Education
  - Subcommittee on Career & Technical Education Chair
- Finance
- Housing & Community Development
- Insurance

== Personal life ==
Abney resides in the Manchester neighborhood of Pittsburgh with his wife Tamara Abney, and their two sons.

== Electoral history ==
Aerion Andrew Abney electoral history

Pennsylvania House of Representatives, 19th district, 2018 Democratic primary
Party	Candidate	Votes	%
Democratic	Jake Wheatley (incumbent)	2,790	48.29%
Democratic	Aerion Andrew Abney	2,423	41.94%
Democratic	Ebony Taylor	564	9.76%
Total votes		5,777	100.00%

Pennsylvania House of Representatives, 19th district, 2020 Democratic primary
Party	Candidate	Votes	%
Democratic	Jake Wheatley (incumbent)	6,484	61.95%
Democratic	Aerion Andrew Abney	3,983	38.05%
Total votes		10,467	100.00%

Pennsylvania House of Representatives, 19th district, 2022 (special)
Party	Candidate	Votes	%
Democratic committee vote
Democratic	Aerion Andrew Abney	55	50.00%
Democratic	Rev. Glenn Grayson	55	50.00%
Total votes		110	100.00%
General election
Democratic	Aerion Andrew Abney	2,643	86.60%
Write-in		409	13.40%
Total votes		3,052	100.00%
Democratic hold			

Pennsylvania House of Representatives, 19th district, 2022 (regular)
Party	Candidate	Votes	%
Democratic primary election
Democratic	Aerion Andrew Abney (incumbent)		
Democratic	Rev. Glenn Grayson		
Total votes			

Pennsylvania House of Representatives
Preceded by Jake Wheatley	Member of the Pennsylvania House of Representatives from the 19th district 2022-present	Incumbent
