= William Russell Robinson =

American politician (1942–2020)

Member of the Pennsylvania House of Representatives from the 19th district
- In office January 3, 1989 – November 30, 2002
- Preceded by: K. Leroy Irvis
- Succeeded by: Jake Wheatley

Personal details
- Born: February 5, 1942 Pittsburgh, Pennsylvania, U.S.
- Died: June 9, 2020 (aged 78) Pittsburgh, Pennsylvania, U.S.
- Party: Democratic
- Children: 2
- Education: Ohio State University (BA); Duquesne University (MA)

William Russell Robinson (February 5, 1942 – June 9, 2020) was an American politician who served as a member of the Pennsylvania House of Representatives from 1989 to 2002.

== Early life and education ==
A native of Pittsburgh, Robinson is a 1960 graduate of Schenley High School. He earned a degree in political science from Ohio State University in 1964 and a master's degree in political science from Duquesne University in 1972.

== Career ==
Robinson began his career as a member of the Pittsburgh City Council.

He was first elected to represent the 19th legislative district in the Pennsylvania House of Representatives in 1988. He was defeated in the 2002 Democratic primary by Jake Wheatley, a staffer for Pittsburgh City Councilman Sala Udin, a Robinson rival.

== Death ==
Robinson died on June 9, 2020, in Pittsburgh.
