= 2013 Pittsburgh mayoral election =

- November 5, 2013
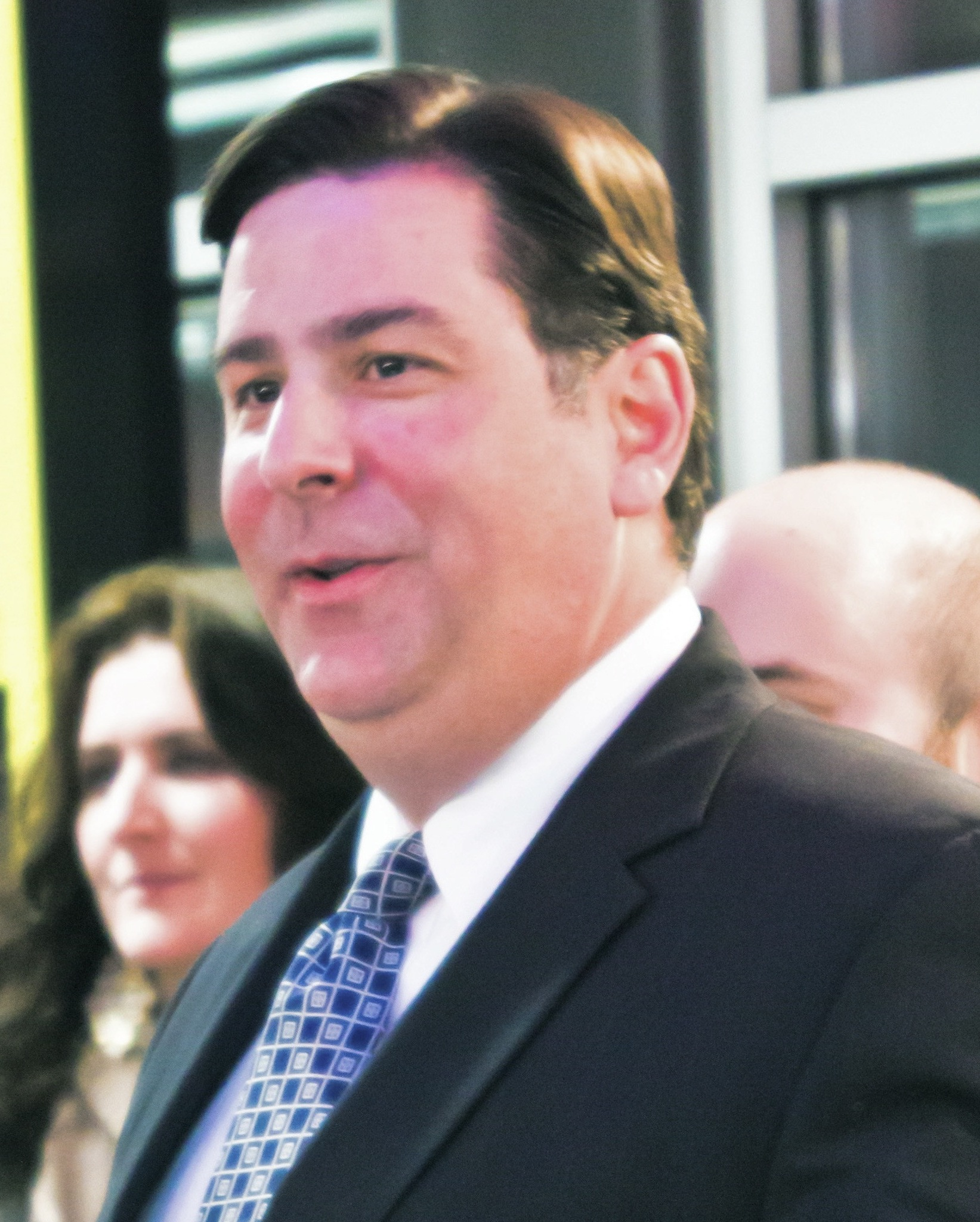

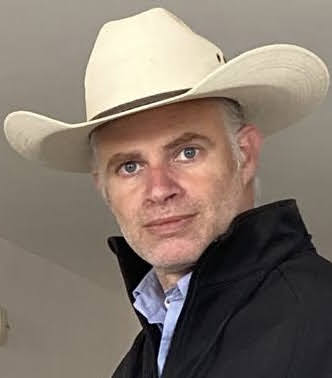
Nominee	Bill Peduto	Joshua Wander
Party	Democratic	Republican
Popular vote	37,006	5,028
Percentage	84.3%	11.5%
- Ward results Peduto: 60–70% 70–80% 80–90% 90–100%
Mayor before election
Luke Ravenstahl
Democratic
Elected Mayor
Bill Peduto
Democratic

The 2013 Pittsburgh mayoral election took place on November 5, 2013. Democrat Bill Peduto was elected the 60th Mayor of Pittsburgh, Pennsylvania. The primary election was held on May 21, 2013. Incumbent Democratic Mayor Luke Ravenstahl, although eligible for a second full term, did not seek reelection as Mayor of Pittsburgh.

Initially, Luke Ravenstahl had indicated an intention to seek reelection in the 2013 election and had led early Democratic primary polling. Following Ravenstahl's withdrawal in early March 2013, several candidates not previously considering a campaign joined the race and others became speculated candidates. As of the primary election petition filing deadline on March 12, 2013, seven Democratic candidates and one Republican candidate, Joshua Wander, had filed to run. One Democratic candidate, Bill Robinson, stated he would run despite missing the petition deadline. After the field settled, there were four candidates seeking the Democratic nomination who were listed on the ballot and one seeking the Republican nomination. In addition, the sole Republican candidate also expressed an intention to run for the Democratic nomination as a write-in candidate.

On May 21, 2013, Bill Peduto won the Democratic primary and Josh Wander, who had run unopposed in the Republican primary, won his party's nomination. Peduto defeated Wander and independent Lester Ludwig in the November general election. He was inaugurated as Pittsburgh's 60th mayor upon the expiration of incumbent mayor Luke Ravenstahl's term in January 2014. The next regular quadrennial mayoral election following the 2013 election took place on November 7, 2017.

== Background ==
In the 2005 election, Democrat Bob O'Connor was elected Mayor of Pittsburgh and assumed office in January 2006. In July 2006, O'Connor was diagnosed with a rare form of lymphoma, which was initially believed to be manageable. His health deteriorated, however, and he died on September 1, 2006. Luke Ravenstahl, as president of the Pittsburgh City Council, was subsequently sworn in and assumed office as mayor. At the time, at age 26, Ravenstahl was the youngest mayor of a major U.S. city.

A special election was scheduled for November 2007, which pitted Ravenstahl and Republican businessman Mark DeSantis. DeSantis mounted a serious campaign despite a heavy Democratic voter registration advantage in Pittsburgh. Nonetheless, Ravenstahl won the election by a wide margin to serve out the remainder of O'Connor's term, ending in 2010. Ravenstahl was again a candidate for re-election, this time for a full term, in the regularly scheduled November 2009 election. In the primary, he defeated City Councilman Patrick Dowd and attorney Carmen Robinson. Both candidates were able to tap into Democratic support; however, neither were able to overcome Ravenstahl's name recognition throughout the city. In the general election, the cross-filed Ravenstahl faced and ultimately defeated independent candidates Franco "Dok" Harris, son of former Pittsburgh Steelers player Franco Harris, and Kevin Acklin, who would eventually become Bill Peduto's Mayoral Chief of Staff after the 2013 election.

Ravenstahl had an unstable relationship with the Pittsburgh City Council throughout his term as mayor, which included disagreements over the city budget. City Councilman Bill Peduto emerged as a political opponent of Ravenstahl's, with Peduto mounting a primary election challenge against Ravenstahl in 2007 before dropping out a short time later. Prior to the 2013 election, Ravenstahl had not held a fundraiser since 2009 and it was uncertain whether or not he would seek another term; however, an undisclosed source indicated to local news outlet KDKA in September 2011 that Ravenstahl would run for re-election in 2013.

== Democratic primary ==
=== Early developments ===
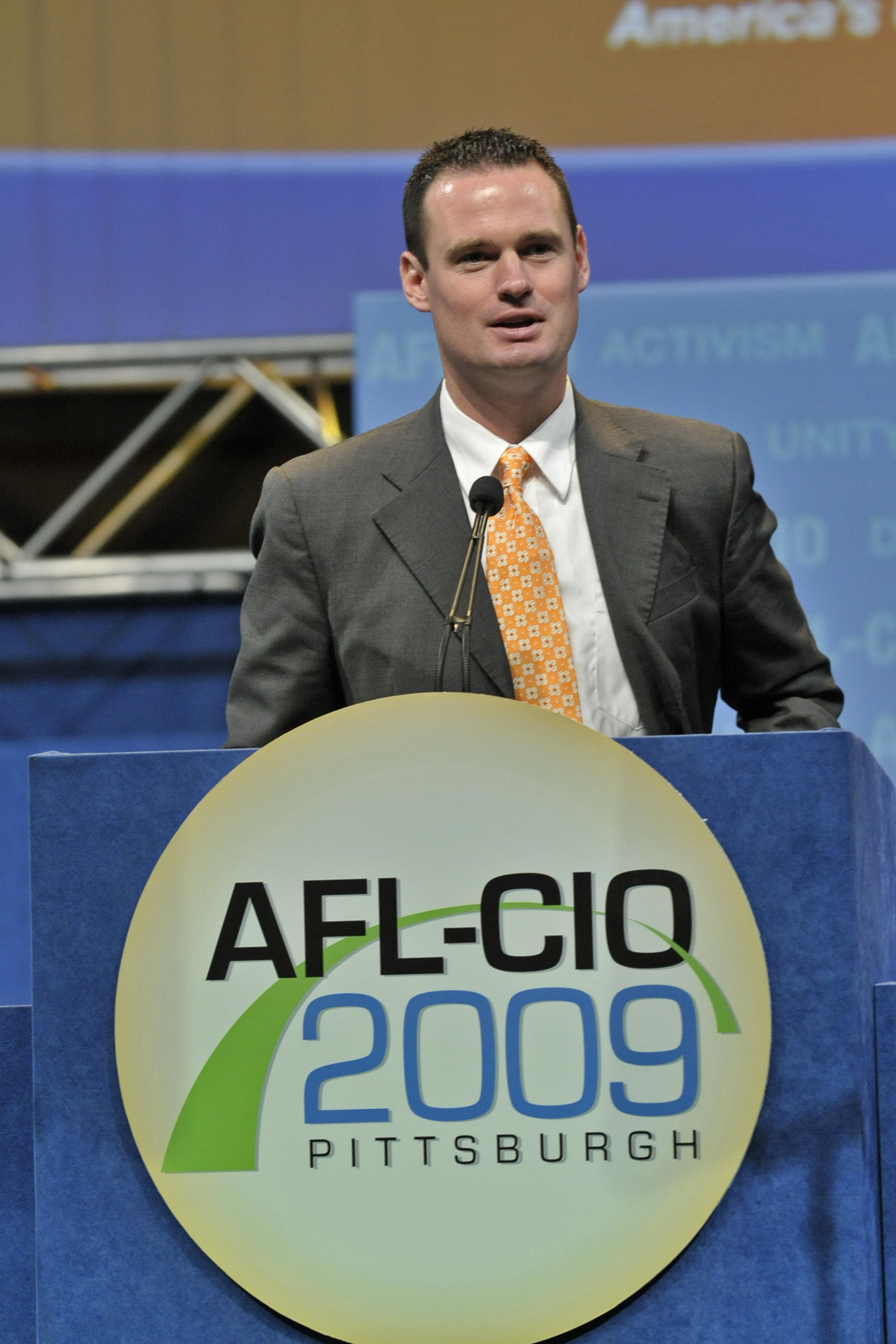
Mayor Luke Ravenstahl initially announced that he would run for re-election, but later reversed his decision.

Several candidates expressed interest in running in the May 21, 2013, Democratic primary election. Incumbent Luke Ravenstahl officially announced in November 2012 that he would seek re-election to a second full term. In addition, Bill Peduto, who had run for Mayor of Pittsburgh in 2005 (losing in the primary to fellow Democratic City Councilman and eventual winner Bob O'Connor) and again for a short time in the 2007 special election before dropping out prior to the primary, announced his candidacy in December 2012 and was immediately endorsed by Allegheny County Executive Rich Fitzgerald. City Controller Michael Lamb, who stated that he had "every intention" of running for mayor, declared his candidacy in mid-January 2013. Jack Wagner, former Auditor General of Pennsylvania, also publicly expressed interest in the race and filed a petition to run in March. Wagner also reportedly considered an independent general election campaign.

Polling conducted between late December 2012 to mid-January 2013 by Civic Science found that a race between Luke Ravenstahl and Bill Peduto would be within single digit percentage points. The polling firm, however, emphasized that the poll was not intended to provide two-way race numbers and that the polling (which was completed on January 16) did not include Michael Lamb, who had entered the race the next day. According to the poll, blue-collar primary voters were more apt to support Ravenstahl while white-collar primary voters were more apt to support Peduto.

On March 1, 2013, Ravenstahl announced that he would not seek reelection, reversing a prior decision to run for another term. The announcement came amid an investigation of fund use at the Pittsburgh Bureau of Police, although Ravenstahl did not make any indication that this had contributed to his decision to withdraw. In addition, Ravenstahl alluded in his announcement to the medical condition of his mother, who had been suffering "medical issues," but did not indicate that this had contributed to the decision either. Ravenstahl stated that he would serve out the remainder of his term, ending in January 2014. Shortly thereafter, City Council President Darlene Harris confirmed her intention to run. In addition, Jake Wheatley, Jim Ferlo, and Ricky Burgess became speculated candidates.

=== After Ravenstahl's withdrawal ===
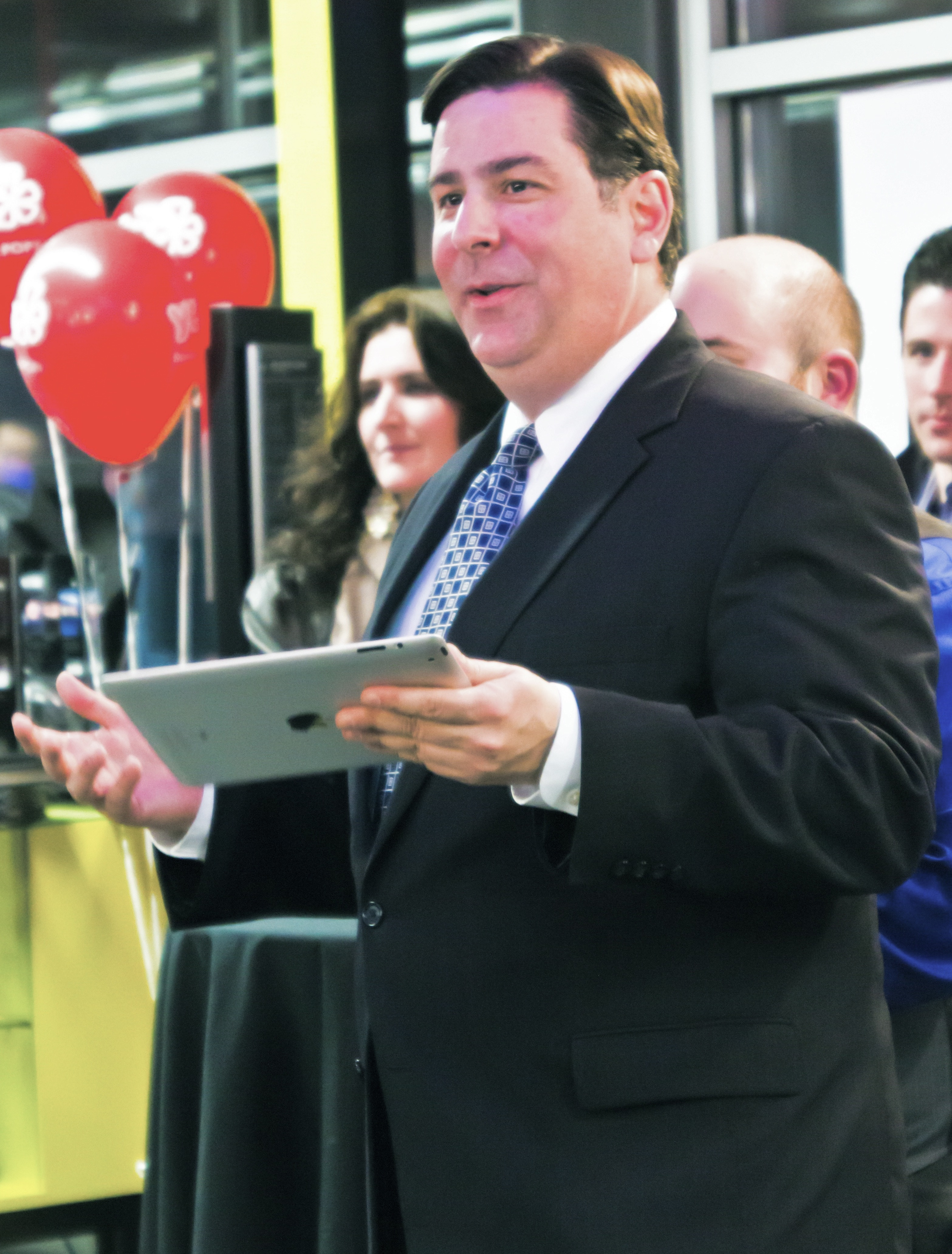
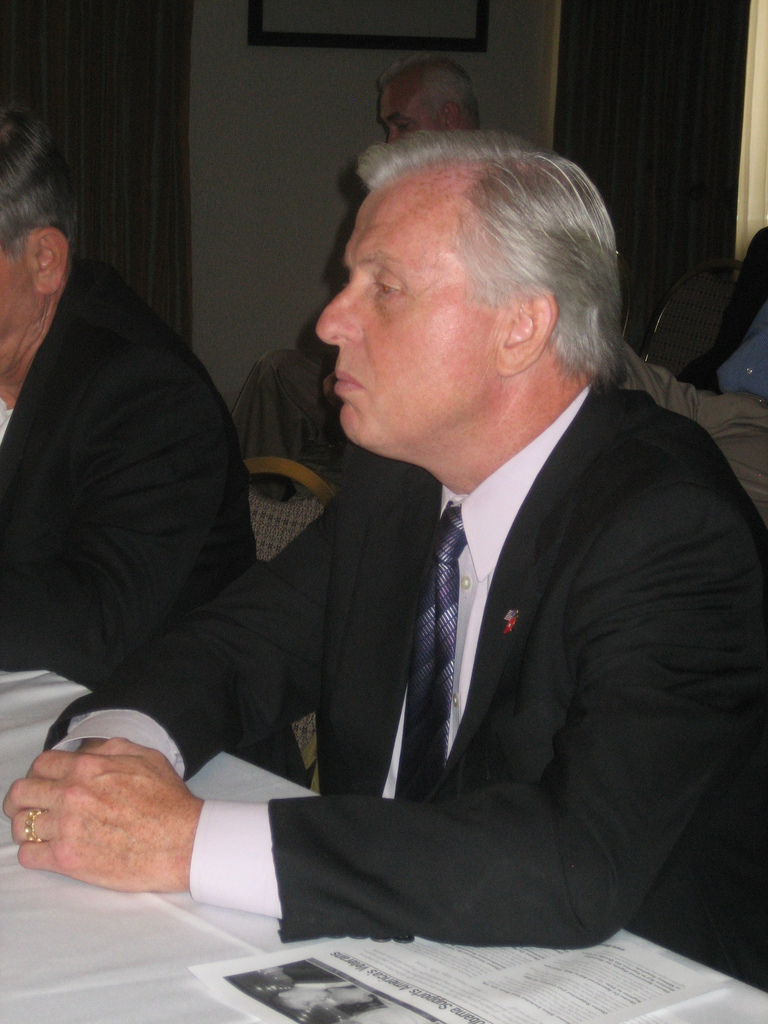
After Luke Ravenstahl's withdrawal, the race evolved into a two-way contest between Bill Peduto (left) and Jack Wagner (right); both had run for mayor in prior elections.

In early March 2013, following the withdrawal of incumbent mayor Luke Ravenstahl, a poll conducted by Keystone Analytics found that Bill Peduto was leading the race, garnering the support of 30 percent of respondents. Jack Wagner was second with 20 percent of respondents voicing support. Nearly a quarter of respondents, 22 percent, remained undecided.

The filing deadline to appear on the Democratic primary ballot was March 12, 2013, at 5:00 PM EDT. At this point, seven candidates had formally filed petitions to run for Mayor of Pittsburgh: Jim Ferlo, Darlene Harris, Michael Lamb, Bill Peduto, A. J. Richardson, Jake Wheatley and Jack Wagner. Allegheny County Councilman Bill Robinson stated that he would run for mayor despite not meeting the deadline for petitions to appear on the ballot. Jim Ferlo, despite filing to run, dropped out of the race three days later, on March 15. On March 27, Darlene Harris dropped out of the race. On the same day, Jack Wagner received endorsements from Pittsburgh police and firefighter unions, as well as former candidate and State Senator Jim Ferlo. Also on March 27, Bill Peduto was endorsed by State Representative Ed Gainey.

Michael Lamb ended his campaign on April 1, 2013, and endorsed Jack Wagner. Shortly thereafter, on April 3, a judge ruled that Wagner could use the approximately US$300,000 in his statewide campaign account, left over from his campaigns for state auditor and Governor of Pennsylvania, after the usage of these funds was challenged by fellow candidate Bill Peduto. Also on April 3, local media reported that candidate A. J. Richardson was arrested for allegedly driving under the influence after having been found by police passed out in his vehicle. Following his release from jail, Richardson dismissed the allegation as an attempt to sabotage his candidacy for mayor and expressed an intention to continue his campaign. However, Richardson stated at a mayoral candidates debate that evening that he would plead guilty to the charges.

Another poll released by Keystone Analytics in early April found that the Democratic primary had become largely a two-way race between Bill Peduto and Jack Wagner, with Wagner taking the lead following Michael Lamb's withdrawal and endorsement. Wagner garnered 38 percent in the poll, with Peduto receiving the support of 31 percent of respondents. Candidates Jake Wheatley and A. J. Richardson garnered 4 and 1 percent, respectively.

Two additional polls, released in late April and mid-May by Keystone Analytics, showed Peduto regaining the lead in the primary race. In the April poll, Peduto's lead was within the plus or minus 4.38 percent margin of error; he led Jack Wagner 38 to 36 percent. Jake Wheatley received 5 percent support and A. J. Richardson received less than 1 percent. A poll released in mid-May, with a plus or minus 4.9 percent margin of error, suggested that Peduto had expanded his lead over Wagner. Peduto was supported by 39 percent of respondents, while Wagner had 36 percent. Wheatley and Richardson garnered 8 and 1 percent, respectively. An additional poll, commissioned by the Pittsburgh Tribune-Review and conducted by Susquehanna Polling & Research and released in the final week before the primary, also showed Peduto leading Wagner, 42 to 33 percent. The same poll showed Wheatley with 6 percent and Richardson with 1 percent.

=== Candidates ===
==== Declared ====
- Bill Peduto, Pittsburgh City Councilman
- A. J. Richardson, school bus monitor
- Jack Wagner, former Pennsylvania Auditor General
- Joshua Wander, Republican candidate, also write-in candidate for Democratic nomination
- Jake Wheatley, State Representative

==== Withdrew ====
- Jim Ferlo, State Senator (withdrew March 15, 2013)
- Darlene Harris, Pittsburgh City Council President (withdrew March 27, 2013)
- Michael Lamb, Pittsburgh City Controller (withdrew April 1, 2013)
- Luke Ravenstahl, incumbent mayor of Pittsburgh (withdrew March 1, 2013)

==== Declined ====
- Wayne D. Fontana, state senator
- Dan Onorato, former Allegheny County Executive
- Chelsa Wagner, Allegheny County Controller and niece of candidate Jack Wagner

=== Polling ===
Poll source	Date(s) administered	Sample size	Margin of error	Jim Ferlo	Darlene Harris	Michael Lamb	Bill Peduto	Luke Ravenstahl	A. J. Richardson	Jack Wagner	Jake Wheatley	Other	Undecided
Susquehanna Polling	May 13–14, 2013	400	±4.9%	—	—	—	42%	—	1%	33%	6%	—	16%
Keystone Analytics	May 7–8, 2013	404	±4.9%	—	—	—	39%	—	1%	32%	8%	—	18%
Keystone Analytics	April 22–23, 2013	401	±4.89%	—	—	—	38%	—	<1%	36%	5%	—	22%
Keystone Analytics	April 2–3, 2013	400	±4.9%	—	—	—	31%	—	1%	38%	4%	3%	23%
Susquehanna Polling	April 1–2, 2013	400	±4.9%	—	—	—	33%	—	1%	40%	4%	—	22%
Lake Research^{[^]}	March 14–18, 2013	408	±4.9%	—	5%	12%	30%	—	—	21%	4%	—	28%
Keystone Analytics	March 4–5, 2013	401	±4.9%	7%	5%	13%	30%	—	—	20%	—	2%	22%
Civic Science	January 26, 2012	1,024		—	—	20%	22%	32%	—	26%	—	—	—

- Internal poll for the Bill Peduto Campaign

=== Results ===
Democratic primary results by ward. Bill Peduto Jack Wagner Jake Wheatley

In the end, Bill Peduto defeated Jack Wagner, Jake Wheatley and A. J. Richardson. Peduto gained a majority of the vote, with about 52 percent. Wagner, Wheatley and Richardson finished with about 40, 8 and 1 percent, respectively. Peduto carried much of the vote in wards in and around Downtown and to the east, with the exception of one ward carried by Wheatley in the uptown section. Wagner was most successful in the South Side and portions of the North Side.

Democratic primary results
Party	Candidate	Votes	%
Democratic	Bill Peduto	23,650	51.81
Democratic	Jack Wagner	18,094	39.64
Democratic	Jake Wheatley	3,508	7.68
Democratic	A. J. Richardson	294	0.64
Democratic	Write-in	103	0.22
Total votes		45,649	100.00

== Republican primary ==
Only one Republican candidate for mayor, Squirrel Hill resident Joshua Wander, filed a petition prior to the March 12 filing deadline to run as a Republican. In addition, Wander had stated an intention to run as a write-in candidate for the Democratic nomination. Wander had previously run as a write-in candidate for the Republican Mayoral nomination in the 2009 election, but was defeated by incumbent mayor Luke Ravenstahl, also a write-in candidate in the Republican primary. The Republican primary took place alongside the Democratic primary on May 21, 2013. Wander, having run unopposed, won the nomination.

=== Candidates ===
==== Declared ====
- Joshua Wander

=== Results ===
Republican primary results
Party	Candidate	Votes	%
Republican	Joshua Wander	2,018	77.14
Republican	Write-in	598	22.86
Total votes		2,616	100.00

== General election ==
Bill Peduto and Josh Wander won the Democratic and Republican primaries, respectively, on May 21, 2013. In addition, City Council President Darlene Harris switched her party registration to "independent" on April 22, 2013, less than an hour prior to the deadline to be eligible as a third party candidate in the general election. August 1 was the deadline for third-party candidates to file to appear on the ballot. Harris did not file to run prior to the deadline, however, and thus was not an official candidate. Independent activist Lester Ludwig was the only officially declared independent running.

As such, three candidates appeared on the general election ballot: Peduto, Wander and Ludwig. From the outset, Peduto was heavily favored by local media and political observers to win the election owing to the Democratic Party's voter registration advantage in Pittsburgh, although Wander stated that it was not his sole intention to win the race, but rather to "convey a message that there is a choice." Two debates had been scheduled in October 2013, but Wander—who had been running his campaign from Israel, where he was working as a security consultant—and Ludwig did not attend. As a result, Peduto was the only candidate to attend the events, reformatting them as town hall events, and local television station WTAE-TV cancelled an October 29 debate as Wander did not confirm that he would be able to attend. Ultimately, Bill Peduto defeated both Wander and Ludwig to be elected as the 60th Mayor of Pittsburgh and was inaugurated to succeed Luke Ravenstahl in January 2014.

=== Candidates ===
- Bill Peduto (Democratic), Pittsburgh City Councilman
- Joshua Wander (Republican), Squirrel Hill resident
- Lester Ludwig (Independent), activist

==== Declined ====
- Darlene Harris (Independent), Pittsburgh City Council President

=== Results ===
General election results
Party	Candidate	Votes	%
Democratic	Bill Peduto	37,006	84.30
Republican	Joshua Wander	5,028	11.45
Independent	Lester Ludwig	1,522	3.47
Write-in		341	0.78
Total votes		43,897	100.00

Preceded by 2009	Pittsburgh mayoral election 2013	Succeeded by 2017
