= Erroll Davis =

American politician (1944–2026)

Erroll B. Davis

Member of the Pennsylvania House of Representatives from the 24th district
- In office January 5, 1971 – November 30, 1972
- Preceded by: Theodore Johnson
- Succeeded by: Joseph Rhodes Jr.

Personal details
- Born: August 5, 1944 Pittsburgh, Pennsylvania, U.S.
- Died: April 26, 2026 (aged 81)
- Party: Democratic
- Spouse: Elaine Davis
- Education: Carnegie Mellon University

Erroll Brown Davis Jr. (August 5, 1944 – April 26, 2026) was an American administrator and businessman.

== Early life and education ==
Erroll Brown Davis Jr. was born in Pittsburgh, Pennsylvania, on August 5, 1944.

He earned a Bachelor of Science in electrical engineering from Carnegie Mellon University in 1965 and an MBA in finance from the University of Chicago in 1967.

== Business career ==
Davis served as the superintendent of the Atlanta Public Schools school district in Atlanta, Georgia. He also served as the chancellor of the University System of Georgia, where he was responsible for the state's 35 public colleges and universities. He has also served as the chairman of the board at Alliant Energy Corporation and president and CEO of WPL Holdings, and chairman of the Carnegie Mellon University board of trustees.

== Political career ==
Davis was a Democratic member of the Pennsylvania House of Representatives.

From 1998 to 2010, he was a non-executive director of multinational oil company BP plc.

In July 2011, Davis was appointed APS's interim superintendent, to serve the position until June 30, 2012.

Davis later served as a member of the Board of Curators for the Georgia Historical Society. He was also elected a member of the National Academy of Engineering in 2021 for leadership in the research and development of renewable resources integration with the grid, and public education. In 2024, he was elected Chair of the National Academy of Engineering.

== Death ==
Davis died on April 26, 2026, at the age of 81. In later years, he suffered from primary lateral sclerosis.
