= Corey O'Connor =

American politician

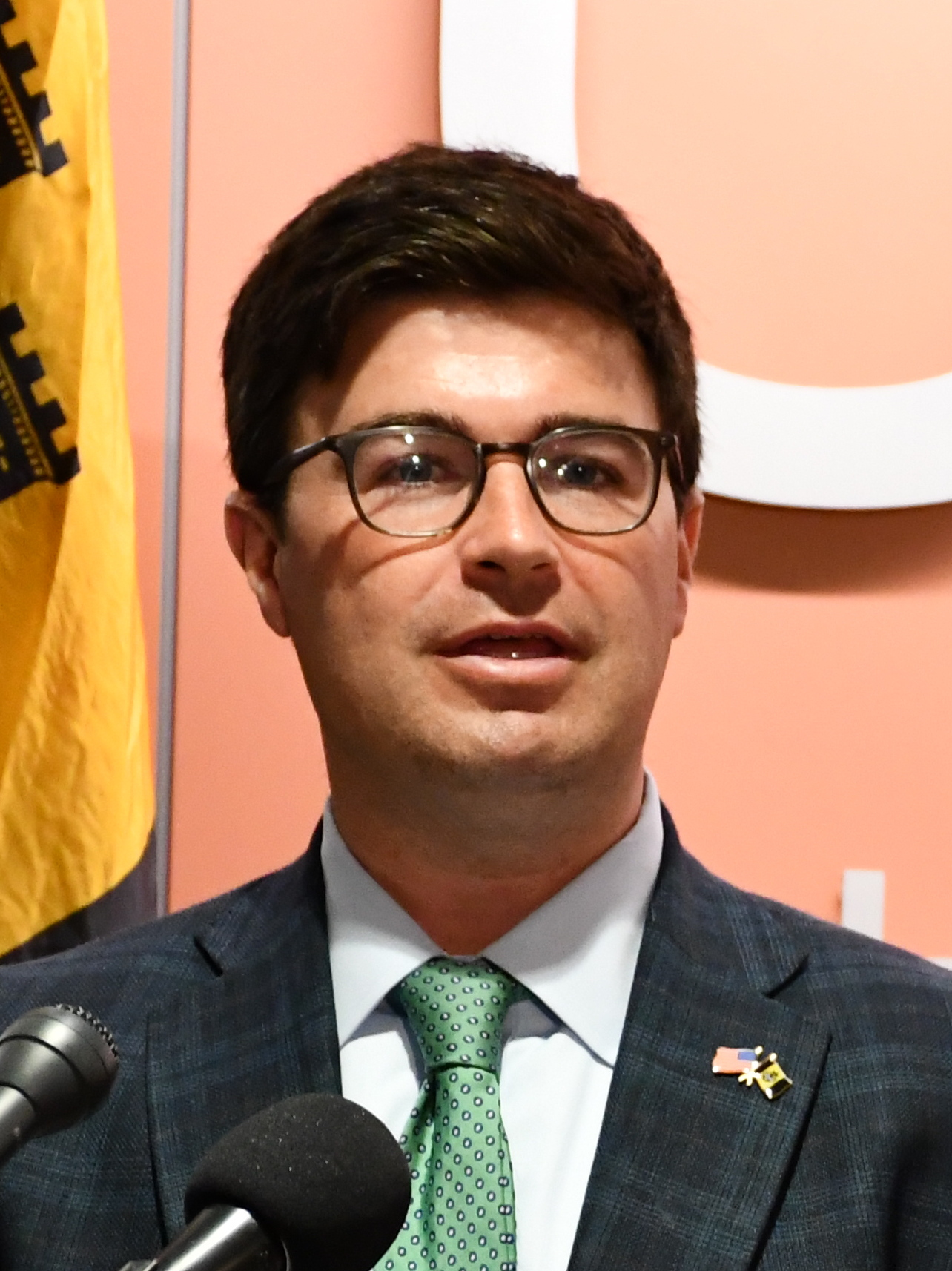
- O'Connor in 2026

62nd Mayor of Pittsburgh
- Incumbent
- Assumed office January 5, 2026
- Preceded by: Ed Gainey

Controller of Allegheny County
- In office July 10, 2022 – January 5, 2026
- Preceded by: Chelsa Wagner
- Succeeded by: Amy Weise Clements (Acting)

Member of the Pittsburgh City Council from the 5th district
- In office January 3, 2012 – July 10, 2022
- Preceded by: Doug Shields
- Succeeded by: Barbara Warwick

Personal details
- Born: August 22, 1984 (age 42) Pittsburgh, Pennsylvania, U.S.
- Party: Democratic
- Spouse: Katie McLaughlin
- Children: 2
- Relatives: Bob O'Connor (father)
- Education: Duquesne University (BA)

Corey O'Connor (born August 22, 1984) is an American politician who has served as the mayor of Pittsburgh since January 5, 2026. O'Connor previously served as the controller of Allegheny County from July 2022 to January 2026. Prior to becoming controller, he served as a member of the Pittsburgh City Council and represented District 5. O'Connor is the son of former Pittsburgh mayor Bob O'Connor.

== Family and education ==
O'Connor was born in Pittsburgh, Pennsylvania, to Bob O'Connor and Judy Levine O'Connor. He is the youngest brother of Terrence O'Connor, a priest, and Heidy Garth. Bob represented District 5 as a member of Pittsburgh City Council from 1992 to 2003, including a four-year stint as council president; he was then elected Pittsburgh mayor in 2005, but six months after taking office in January 2006, he was diagnosed with a rare brain cancer and died seven months later. In his father's memory, Corey and his family established the Bob O'Connor Memorial Fund. To support the fund, they host the yearly "O'Connor Cookie Cruise" on the Gateway Clipper Fleet, which is attended by thousands.

O'Connor graduated from Central Catholic High School and earned his bachelor's degree in elementary education from Duquesne University. He married Katie Stohlberg on June 29, 2013. Nearly 8 years later, he married Katie McLaughlin on April 16, 2021, and they reside in Pittsburgh's Swisshelm Park neighborhood with their daughter and son.

== Career ==
O'Connor began serving as the Pittsburgh City Council member for District 5 on January 3, 2012. His district included the neighborhoods of Glen Hazel, Greenfield, Hays, Hazelwood, Lincoln Place, New Homestead, Regent Square, Squirrel Hill South, and Swisshelm Park.

O'Connor received national media coverage for his response to the Pittsburgh synagogue shooting. He subsequently co-sponsored or supported gun reform legislation. He has also advocated nationally for stricter gun ordinances.

In 2022, O'Connor was nominated by Governor Tom Wolf and then confirmed by a Pennsylvania State Senate committee to become the next Allegheny County Controller, filling the vacancy left when Chelsa Wagner vacated the office on January 3, 2022, after being elected in 2021 to serve as a judge on the county's Court of Common Pleas. On July 10, 2022, O'Connor resigned as a member of city council and then was immediately sworn in as county controller. He was elected to a full term in 2023.

O'Connor's vacated city councilmember position was succeeded by Democrat Barbara Greenwood Warwick in a special election on November 8, 2022.

=== Mayor of Pittsburgh ===
On December 10, 2024, O'Connor announced that he would run for Mayor of Pittsburgh in the 2025 election, challenging incumbent mayor Ed Gainey in the Democratic primary. On May 20, 2025, O'Connor defeated Gainey in the primary election. In the general election, he ran against Republican Tony Moreno, who was Gainey's opponent in 2021, and won with 86% of the vote.

Political offices
Preceded by Ed Gainey	Mayor of Pittsburgh; 2026–present	Incumbent
