= 2021 Pittsburgh mayoral election =

- November 2, 2021
- Turnout: 30.7%
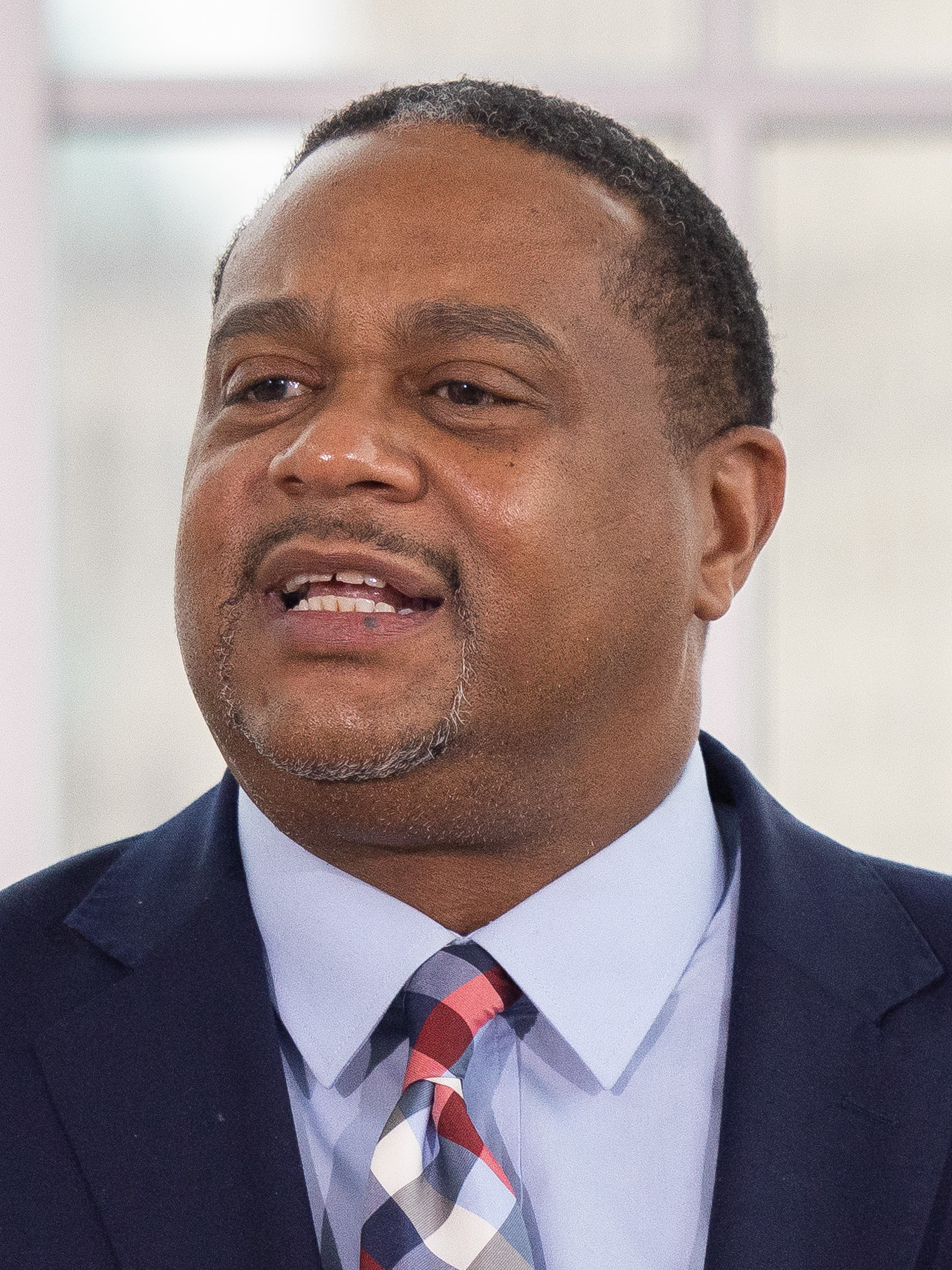

Nominee	Ed Gainey	Tony Moreno
Party	Democratic	Republican
Popular vote	50,165	20,162
Percentage	70.8%	28.4%
- Gainey: 50–60% 60–70% 70–80% 80–90% >90% Moreno: 50–60% 60–70% 70–80% Tie: 50%
Mayor before election
Bill Peduto
Democratic
Elected Mayor
Ed Gainey
Democratic

The 2021 Pittsburgh mayoral election took place on November 2, 2021. The primary election was held on May 18, 2021. The Democratic nominee, State Representative Ed Gainey, defeated the Republican nominee, retired police officer Tony Moreno.

Incumbent Democratic Mayor Bill Peduto ran for re-election to a third term in office, but lost renomination to state representative Ed Gainey. Four Democrats and no Republicans filed to appear on their respective primary ballots. Tony Moreno, though having unsuccessfully sought the Democratic nomination, was the Republican nominee after having earned sufficient votes in the Republican primary as a write-in candidate to win the nomination. Two independent candidates had originally indicated an intention to file to appear on the general election ballot, though one withdrew and the other was removed from the ballot by judicial order. With 70,885 ballots cast, this was the highest turnout for a Pittsburgh mayoral race since 1997.

== Background ==
Bill Peduto was first elected in the 2013 election to succeed Luke Ravenstahl and assumed office in January 2014. Peduto sought and was re-elected to a second term in the 2017 election; in November 2017, Peduto garnered 96% of the vote, having not had any significant opposition in the general election. No sitting mayor had lost reelection since 1933.

== Democratic primary ==
The Democratic primary election was held on May 18, 2021. As of January 2021, four candidates had indicated an intention to seek the Democratic nomination. Retired Pittsburgh Police officer Tony Moreno announced his intention in September 2019, William Peduto announced his campaign for a third term in mid—January 2021, and State Representative Ed Gainey launched his campaign in late January 2021. Activist Will Parker launched his campaign in mid-December 2020. In March, four Democrats had filed paperwork to appear on the ballot, Peduto, Gainey, Moreno, and college math tutor and ride-sharing driver Michael Thompson. Parker did not file nominating papers.

In mid-February 2021, Pittsburgh City Paper reported candidate Tony Moreno's Twitter included tweets praising Donald Trump, were supportive of Trump causes, and contained contempt for Democrats. After Pittsburgh City Paper's report was published Moreno's tweets were criticised by Pittsburgh's Democratic Committee chairman, many tweets were deleted from Moreno's Twitter, and his Twitter was switched to protected status.

In early March 2021, the Allegheny County Democratic Committee announced that it had endorsed Gainey over the incumbent mayor Peduto, with 326 votes. Moreno received 224 votes. Peduto did not actively seek the endorsement of the committee, citing its endorsement of a Democratic candidate for the Pennsylvania House of Representatives who had made social media posts supportive of then-President Donald Trump. Peduto received the endorsements of some other Democratic leaders, including County Executive Rich Fitzgerald, U.S. Representative Mike Doyle, and State Senate minority leader Jay Costa.

=== Candidates ===
==== Nominee ====
- Ed Gainey, Pennsylvania state representative from the 24th District

==== Defeated in primary ====
- Tony Moreno, retired Pittsburgh Police officer
- Bill Peduto, incumbent mayor of Pittsburgh
- Michael Thompson, college math tutor and ride-sharing driver

==== Failed to qualify ====
- Will Parker, businessman and activist (running as an independent)

=== Endorsements ===
Bill Peduto

Federal officials

- Mike Doyle, U.S. Representative for Pennsylvania's 18th congressional district

State officials

- Jay Costa, Minority Leader of the Pennsylvania Senate (D-43)
- Wayne Fontana, state senator (D-42)

County officials

- Rich Fitzgerald, Allegheny County Executive

Local officials

- Ricky Burgess, member of Pittsburgh City Council
- Anthony Coghill, member of Pittsburgh City Council
- Theresa Kail-Smith, member of Pittsburgh City Council
- Bruce Kraus, member of Pittsburgh City Council
- R. Daniel Lavelle, member of Pittsburgh City Council
- Corey O'Connor, member of Pittsburgh City Council
- Erika Strassburger, member of Pittsburgh City Council
- Bobby Wilson, member of Pittsburgh City Council

Labor unions

- Allegheny County AFL–CIO
- SEIU Local 32
- Sheet Metal Union Local 12
- Steamfitters Union Local 449
Ed Gainey

State legislators

- Sara Innamorato, Pennsylvania state representative from the 21st district
- Summer Lee, Pennsylvania state representative from the 34th district
- Jake Wheatley, Pennsylvania state representative from the 19th district

Local officials

- Deb Gross, member of Pittsburgh City Council

Newspapers

- Pittsburgh Post-Gazette

Political organizations

- Allegheny County Democratic Committee

Labor unions

- SEIU Healthcare Pennsylvania

=== Results ===
Results by ward: Gainey—30–40% Gainey—40–50% Gainey—50–60% Gainey—60–70% Gainey—70–80% Peduto—30–40% Peduto—40–50% Peduto—50–60% Moreno—40–50%

Bill Peduto conceded the Democratic primary election to Ed Gainey on the night of the election.

Democratic primary results
Candidate	Votes	%
Ed Gainey	26,479	46.4
Bill Peduto (incumbent)	22,406	39.2
Tony Moreno	7,442	13.0
Michael Thompson	680	1.2
Write-in	117	0.2
Total votes	57,124	100

== Republican primary ==
No Republican filed to run.

=== Results ===
Republican primary results
Candidate	Votes	%
Tony Moreno (write-in)	1,379	64.6
Bill Peduto (incumbent) (write-in)	285	13.3
Ed Gainey (write-in)	176	8.2
Other write-in votes	276	12.9
Total votes	2,136	100

=== Aftermath ===
Under Pennsylvania law, a candidate can win a party's nomination via write-in votes if they surpass 250 votes in said party's primary, even if they are not a member of that party. This means that Moreno and Peduto both qualified to appear on the November ballot as the Republican nominee. Peduto stated he had no intention of continuing his campaign and endorsed Ed Gainey. Moreno announced that he would accept the Republican nomination in late June and switched his party registration to Republican.

==== Accepted nomination ====
- Tony Moreno, retired police officer

===== Declined =====
- Bill Peduto, incumbent mayor (Democratic)

== Independents ==
=== Failed to qualify ===
- Will Parker (ran as a write-in)

=== Withdrawn ===
- Marlin Woods, businessman, public speaker, author, mentor

== General election ==
=== Results ===
2021 Pittsburgh mayoral election
Party	Candidate	Votes	%
Democratic	Ed Gainey	50,165	70.77
Republican	Tony Moreno	20,162	28.44
Write-in		558	0.79
Total votes		70,885	100%
Democratic hold			
