= Theodore Johnson (politician) =

American politician

Member of the Pennsylvania House of Representatives from the 24th district
- In office January 7, 1969 – November 30, 1970
- Preceded by: District created
- Succeeded by: Erroll Davis

Member of the Pennsylvania House of Representatives from the Allegheny County district
- In office January 5, 1965 – November 30, 1968

Personal details
- Born: May 3, 1903 Mount Vernon, Georgia
- Died: December 1992 (aged 89) Pittsburgh, Pennsylvania
- Party: Democratic
- Spouse: Marietta Horne
- Children: six

Theodore Johnson (May 5, 1903 – December 1992) was a Democratic member of the Pennsylvania House of Representatives.

He was born in Georgia to William Edward and Mary (née Collins) Johnson.
