= Pennsylvania House of Representatives, District 19 =

American legislative district

Pennsylvania's 19th State House of Representatives district
Representative
Aerion Abney; D–Pittsburgh
- Population (2022): 61,450

The 19th Pennsylvania House of Representatives District is located in southwestern Pennsylvania and has been represented by Democrat Aerion Abney since 2022.

== District profile ==
Pennsylvania's 19th District is located entirely in Pittsburgh and includes the following area:

- Pittsburgh (part)
  - Ward 01
  - Ward 02 (part)
    - Division 01
  - Ward 04 (part)
    - Division 01
    - Division 02
    - Division 17
    - Division 19
  - Ward 05 (part)
    - Division 01
    - Division 02
    - Division 16
  - Ward 15 (part)
    - Divisions 13
    - Division 14
    - Division 15
    - Division 16
    - Division 17
    - Division 18
    - Division 19
  - Ward 17 (part)
    - Divisions 01
    - Division 02
    - Division 03
  - Ward 18 (part)
    - Division 02
    - Division 03
    - Division 04
    - Division 05
    - Division 06
    - Division 07
    - Division 08
    - Division 09
    - Division 10
    - Division 11
  - Ward 20 (part)
    - Division 08
    - Division 09
    - Division 10
    - Division 11
    - Division 12
    - Division 13
  - Ward 21
  - Ward 22
  - Ward 23 (part)
    - Division 02
  - Ward 25
  - Ward 26 (part)
    - Division 01
    - Division 02
    - Division 03
    - Division 04
    - Division 05
    - Division 06
    - Division 07
    - Division 08
    - Division 10
    - Division 11
    - Division 14
    - Division 16
  - Ward 27 (part)
    - Division 06
    - Division 09
    - Division 10
    - Division 11
    - Division 12
    - Division 13
  - Ward 30

== Representatives ==
Representative	Party	Years	District home	Note
Prior to 1969, seats were apportioned by county.
K. Leroy Irvis	Democrat	1969 – 1988	Pittsburgh	
William Russell Robinson	Democrat	1989 – 2002		
Jake Wheatley	Democrat	2003 – 2022	Pittsburgh	Resigned to become chief of staff to Pittsburgh Mayor Ed Gainey
Aerion Abney	Democrat	2022 – present	Pittsburgh	Elected in special election to replace Wheatley

== Recent election results ==
PA House election, 2024: Pennsylvania House, District 19
Party	Candidate	Votes	%
Democratic	Aerion Abney (incumbent)	Unopposed	
Total votes		22,579	100.00
Democratic hold			

PA House election, 2022: Pennsylvania House, District 19
Party	Candidate	Votes	%
Democratic	Aerion Abney (incumbent)	Unopposed	
Total votes		16,296	100.00
Democratic hold			

PA House special election, 2022: Pennsylvania House, District 19
Party	Candidate	Votes	%
Democratic	Aerion Abney	Unopposed	
Total votes		2,707	100.00
Democratic hold			

PA House election, 2020: Pennsylvania House, District 19
Party	Candidate	Votes	%
Democratic	Jake Wheatley, Jr. (incumbent)	Unopposed	
Total votes		22,700	100.00
Democratic hold			

PA House election, 2018: Pennsylvania House, District 19
Party	Candidate	Votes	%
Democratic	Jake Wheatley, Jr. (incumbent)	Unopposed	
Total votes		17,930	100.00
Democratic hold			

PA House election, 2016: Pennsylvania House, District 19
Party	Candidate	Votes	%
Democratic	Jake Wheatley, Jr. (incumbent)	Unopposed	
Total votes		23,579	100.00
Democratic hold			

PA House election, 2014: Pennsylvania House, District 19
Party	Candidate	Votes	%
Democratic	Jake Wheatley, Jr. (incumbent)	9,404	86.65
Independent	Mark Brentley, Sr.	1,449	13.35
Total votes		10,853	100.00
Democratic hold			

PA House election, 2012: Pennsylvania House, District 19
Party	Candidate	Votes	%
Democratic	Jake Wheatley, Jr. (incumbent)	Unopposed	
Total votes		20,942	100.00
Democratic hold			

PA House election, 2010: Pennsylvania House, District 19
Party	Candidate	Votes	%
Democratic	Jake Wheatley, Jr. (incumbent)	Unopposed	
Total votes		10,751	100.00
Democratic hold			
