= Pennsylvania House of Representatives, District 24 =

American legislative district

Pennsylvania's 24th State House of Representatives district
Representative
La'Tasha D. Mayes; D–Pittsburgh
- Population (2022): 61,444

The 24th Pennsylvania House of Representatives District is in southwestern Pennsylvania and has been represented by La'Tasha D. Mayes since 2023.

== District profile ==
The 24th District is located in Allegheny County, entirely within Pittsburgh, and includes the following area:

- Pittsburgh (part)
  - Ward 04 (part)
    - Division 03
    - Division 04
    - Division 06
    - Division 07
    - Division 18
  - Ward 05 (part)
    - Division 03
    - Division 04
    - Division 05
    - Division 06
    - Division 07
    - Division 08
    - Division 09
    - Division 10
    - Division 11
    - Division 12
    - Division 13
    - Division 14
    - Division 15
    - Division 17
    - Division 18
  - Ward 07 (part)
    - Division 03
    - Division 04
    - Division 08
    - Division 09
    - Division 11
    - Division 12
  - Ward 08
  - Ward 10 (part)
    - Division 08
    - Division 09
    - Division 11
    - Division 12
    - Division 13
    - Division 14
    - Division 15
    - Division 16
    - Division 17
    - Division 18
    - Division 19
  - Ward 11
  - Ward 12
  - Ward 13 (part)
    - Division 02
    - Division 03
    - Division 04
    - Division 05
    - Division 06
    - Division 07
    - Division 09
    - Division 11
    - Division 12
    - Division 15
    - Division 16
    - Division 17
    - Division 18
    - Division 19

== Representatives ==
Representative	Party	Years	District home	Note
Prior to 1969, seats were apportioned by county.
Theodore Johnson	Democrat	1969–1970		
Erroll B. Davis	Democrat	1971–1972		
Joseph Rhodes, Jr.	Democrat	1973–1980		
William W. Pendleton	Democrat	1981–1982		
Joseph Preston, Jr.	Democrat	1983–2012		Lost renomination
Edward Gainey	Democrat	2013-2022		Resigned after being inaugurated as mayor of Pittsburgh
Martell Covington	Democrat	2022–2022		Won special election on April 5, 2022; lost concurrent primary to serve full term to La'Tasha D. Mayes
La'Tasha D. Mayes	Democrat	2023–present		

== Recent election results ==
PA House election, 2024: Pennsylvania House, District 24
Party	Candidate	Votes	%
Democratic	La'Tasha Mayes (incumbent)	Unopposed	
Total votes		27,890	100.00
Democratic hold			

PA House election, 2022: Pennsylvania House, District 24
Party	Candidate	Votes	%
Democratic	La'Tasha Mayes	Unopposed	
Total votes		21,832	100.00
Democratic hold			

PA House special election, 2022: Pennsylvania House, District 22
Party	Candidate	Votes	%
Democratic	Martell Covington	5,101	94.22
Republican	Todd Koger	313	5.78
Total votes		5,414	100.00
Democratic hold			

PA House election, 2020: Pennsylvania House, District 24
Party	Candidate	Votes	%
Democratic	Ed Gainey (incumbent)	Unopposed	
Total votes		29,919	100.00
Democratic hold			

PA House election, 2018: Pennsylvania House, District 24
Party	Candidate	Votes	%
Democratic	Ed Gainey (incumbent)	Unopposed	
Total votes		25,322	100.00
Democratic hold			

PA House election, 2016: Pennsylvania House, District 24
Party	Candidate	Votes	%
Democratic	Ed Gainey (incumbent)	Unopposed	
Total votes		30,562	100.00
Democratic hold			

PA House election, 2014: Pennsylvania House, District 24
Party	Candidate	Votes	%
Democratic	Ed Gainey (incumbent)	Unopposed	
Total votes		15,600	100.00
Democratic hold			

PA House election, 2012: Pennsylvania House, District 24
Party	Candidate	Votes	%
Democratic	Ed Gainey	Unopposed	
Total votes		26,032	100.00
Democratic hold			

PA House election, 2010: Pennsylvania House, District 24
Party	Candidate	Votes	%
Democratic	Joseph Preston, Jr. (incumbent)	Unopposed	
Total votes		14,405	100.00
Democratic hold			
