= 2017 Pittsburgh mayoral election =

- November 7, 2017
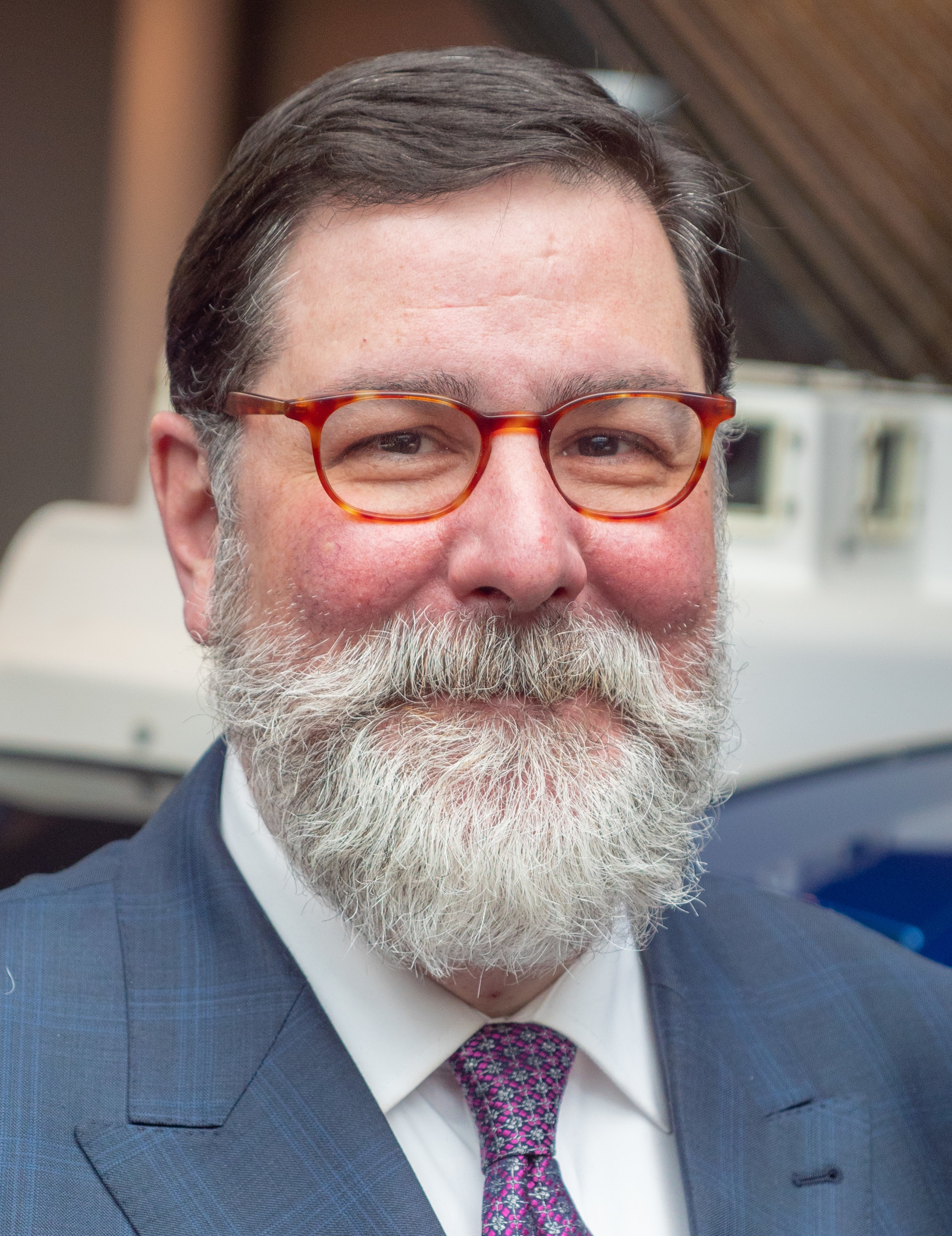
Candidate	Bill Peduto
Party	Democratic
Popular vote	40,540
Percentage	96.0%
Mayor before election
Bill Peduto
Democratic
Elected Mayor
Bill Peduto
Democratic

The 2017 Pittsburgh mayoral election took place on November 7, 2017. The primary election was held on May 16, 2017. Incumbent Democratic Mayor Bill Peduto successfully ran for re-election to a second term. Three Democrats, including Peduto, and no Republicans filed petitions to appear on the respective primary ballots before the deadline on March 7, 2017. Peduto won the Democratic primary and was officially unopposed in the general election.

== Background ==
The 2013 election, in which then-incumbent Mayor Luke Ravenstahl was originally a candidate for re-election before withdrawing, saw an open election for Mayor of Pittsburgh. Then-city council member Bill Peduto, who had run for Mayor of Pittsburgh in the 2005 election and the 2007 special election following the death of Bob O'Connor, won a four-way Democratic primary. He went on to win the general election comfortably, defeating his Republican opponent, Joshua Wander, by 73 points. He assumed office in January 2014.

== Democratic primary ==
The Democratic primary election was held on May 16, 2017. Incumbent Mayor Bill Peduto formally announced his re-election campaign on December 14, 2016. Peduto's first challenger, activist John Welch, declared his candidacy on January 21. In mid-February 2017, two individuals had filed to vie for the primary election endorsement of the Allegheny County Democratic Committee: Peduto and city council member Darlene Harris, the latter of whom had not officially announced a campaign. John Welch did not file for the committee endorsement, but remained a candidate in the primary.

The committee announced its endorsement of Bill Peduto on March 5. Harris, although losing the party endorsement, gained 40% of the committee votes and filed petitions just before the March 7 deadline to appear on the ballot in the primary, despite not having formed an official campaign. Because of this, Harris did not file a campaign finance report and challenged the legality of the city ordinance requiring them.

=== Candidates ===
==== Declared ====
- Bill Peduto, incumbent Mayor of Pittsburgh
- Darlene Harris, Pittsburgh City Council member (Note: Harris appeared on the ballot but did not form an official campaign organization that would require campaign finance reporting.)
- John Welch, dean of students at Pittsburgh Theological Seminary

=== Results ===
On May 16, Bill Peduto defeated John Welch and Darlene Harris to win the Democratic nomination.

Mayor of Pittsburgh, 2017
Primary election
Party	Candidate	Votes	%
Democratic	Bill Peduto (incumbent)	27,270	68.90
Democratic	John Welch	6,895	17.42
Democratic	Darlene Harris	5,266	13.31
	write-ins	147	0.37
Total votes		39,578	100.00

== General election ==
No Republican received the requisite 250 write-in votes in the Republican primary to become that party's nominee, but Peduto received 228 write-ins, Darlene Harris received 229, and John Welch received 65, with 21 votes that had not been verified. Two independent candidates—James Rack and Khalid Raheem—filed to appear on the ballot before the early August 2017 deadline, but were removed from the ballot in late August after their nominating petitions were successfully challenged by the Allegheny County Democratic Party. Rack had failed to provide a financial interest statement to the city clerk and Raheem's petition contained too few city resident signatures to qualify. Ultimately, Peduto was re-elected, having been the only candidate listed on the general election ballot.

=== Results ===
Mayor of Pittsburgh, 2017
Party	Candidate	Votes	%
Democratic	Bill Peduto (incumbent)	40,540	95.96%
	write-ins	1,706	4.04%
Total votes		42,246	100.00%
Democratic hold			
