= Joshua Wander =

Israeli rabbi and activist (born 1970)

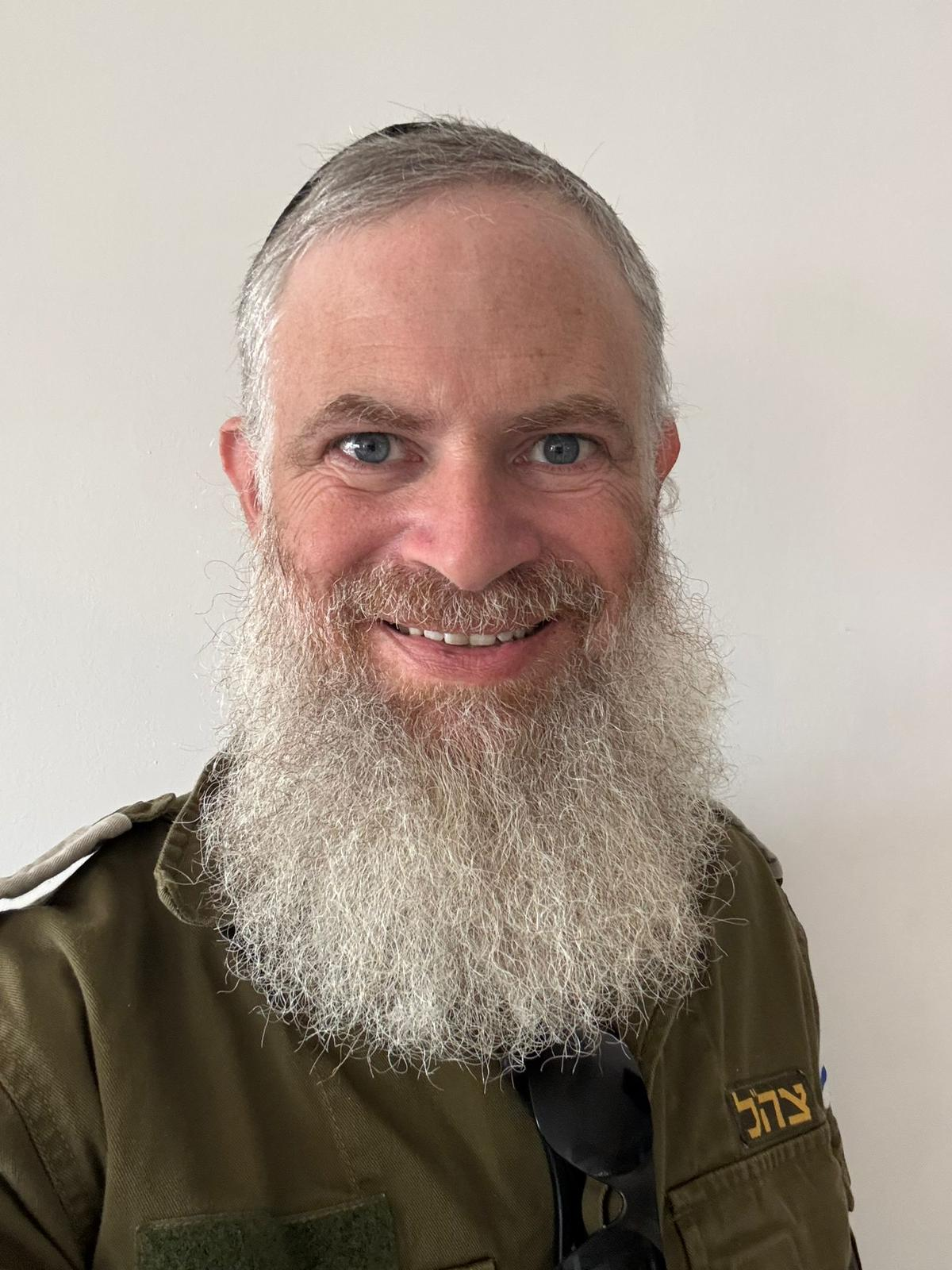
- Born: 1970 (age 55–56); McKeesport, Pennsylvania, U.S.
- Occupation: Public Relations Consultant
- Political party: Republican
- Website: bringthemhome.org.il

Joshua Wander is an American born Israeli rabbi, aliyah activist, and former ZAKA spokesman. He is known for his work with ZAKA, Israel’s search and rescue and disaster response organization, and for founding the aliyah advocacy group Bring Them Home, which encourages the immigration of Jews from the diaspora to Israel. Wander has also been active in public safety and emergency preparedness, appearing on the reality television program Doomsday Preppers and maintaining a disaster preparedness blog. Previously, he was the Republican nominee for Mayor of Pittsburgh in 2013 general election and has held roles in public relations, writing, and Jewish education. He is also a public relations consultant representing projects in, and around the Old City of Jerusalem. He recreated the Chatzotzrot bringing them back into existence after a 2000 year hiatus.

== Early life and education ==
Born in McKeesport, Pennsylvania, Wander graduated from a rabbinical college in Israel with a Bachelor of Talmudic Law and subsequently earned a Masters in Public and International Affairs from the University of Pittsburgh Graduate School of Public and International Affairs. Wander studied at Ner Yisrael in Baltimore and the Mirrer Yeshiva in Jerusalem. Wander served as an IDF commander in Lebanon and officer in the auxiliary US Air Force. Wander served in the Israel Defense Forces and later in the IDF reserves, including service connected to emergency management roles.

== Career ==
Wander served as an advisor in the Knesset and also worked for the Jerusalem Post.

=== Chatzotzrot ===
Wander worked on bringing back the silver trumpets that Israel was commanded to blow in times or trouble and when going out to war. After extensive planning, preparation and supervision, the trumpets were made and on Tisha B’Av in 2024, the trumpets were blown for the first time in 2000 years. Since then, Wander has blown them at a number of auspicious events including when Israel went out to war against Hamas. A book was written about Wander and his recreation of the Trumpets.

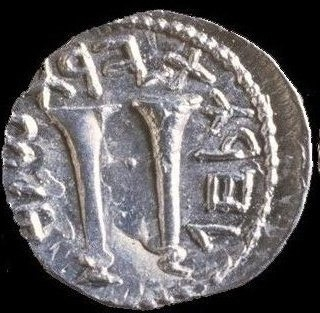
An ancient coin featuring the trumpets that Wander remade

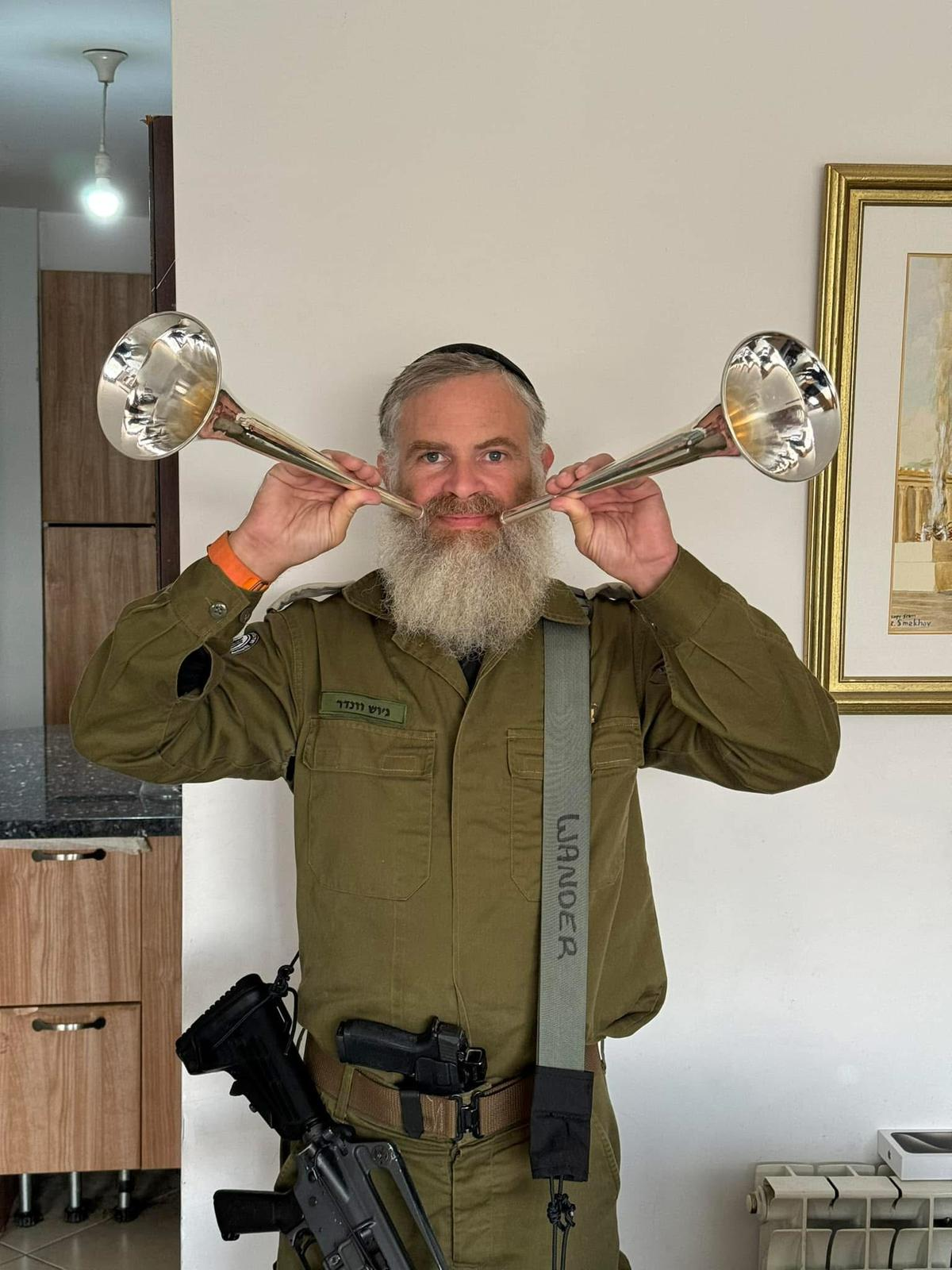
Joshua Wander holding two Chatzotzrot (silver trumpets)

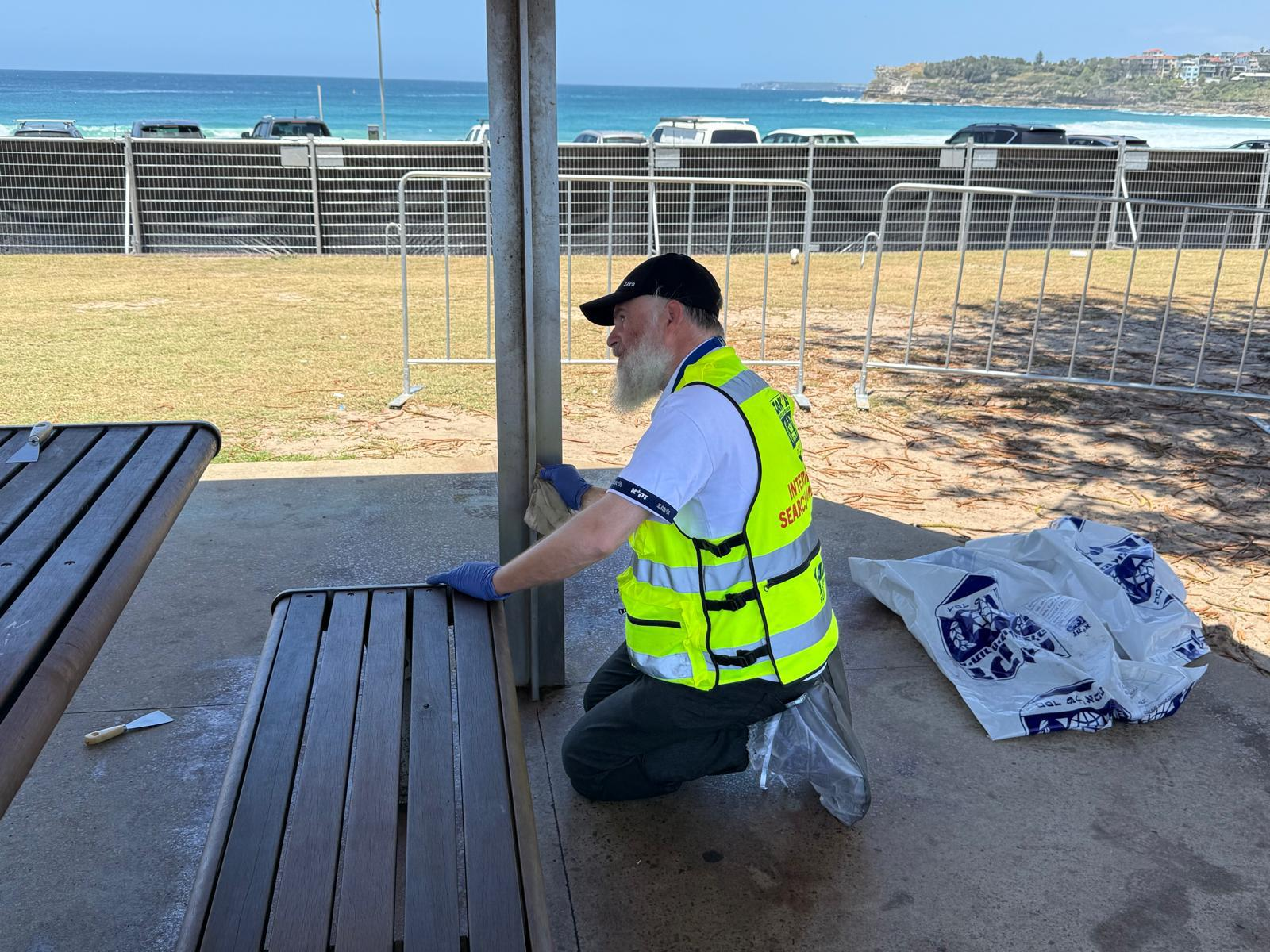
Joshua Wander volunteering with ZAKA during recovery operations in Sydney following 2025 Bondi Beach shooting.

=== ZAKA ===
Wander has been involved with ZAKA, Israel’s volunteer search, rescue, and recovery organization, for over a decade as a volunteer in its chesed shel emet (true kindness) and international search and rescue units. He also served as ZAKA’s international spokesman during part of 2023. Following the Hamas led attacks on Israel on October 7, 2023, Wander was active in recovery and identification efforts in affected communities alongside other ZAKA volunteers. In interviews published in international media, he described the scale and difficulty of the work recovering civilian bodies in areas hit by the attacks, noting the intensity of destruction and the emotional challenges faced by volunteers. In coverage of the early days of the conflict, media outlets reported Wander commenting on ZAKA teams’ work clearing bodies in locations such as Kibbutz Be’eri, emphasizing the extensive and somber task of recovering the dead amid ongoing violence.

ZAKA, the organization with which Wander has long been affiliated, has responded to major disasters including the Hurricane Harvey, the Pittsburgh synagogue shooting, the Ethiopian Airlines Flight 302, the Surfside condominium collapse, humanitarian missions related to the Russian invasion of Ukraine, the 2023 Turkey–Syria earthquakes and the 2025 Bondi Beach shooting.

=== Emergency Preparedness and Media Appearances ===
Wander gained national attention with his 2014 appearance on the National Geographic Channel’s Doomsday Preppers, where he showcased his family’s disaster planning, including kosher long term food storage and regular preparedness drills. He has emphasized that his focus is on practical readiness for a range of possible emergencies, not on belief in apocalyptic scenarios, and has publicly refuted sensationalized portrayals of preppers. Through his advocacy, he has engaged Jewish communities in discussions about emergency preparedness tailored to observant lifestyles, promoting skills such as networking, self-sufficiency, and family safety planning.

=== Aliyah advocacy ===
In 2019, Wander founded the organization Bring Them Home, which focuses on encouraging Aliyah by educating Jewish communities in the Diaspora about immigration to Israel and promoting relocation through conferences, media engagement, and grassroots outreach. Bring Them Home describes its mission as providing resources and educational material on the importance of living in the Land of Israel. As part of these outreach efforts, Wander moderated and organized Aliyah-focused conferences and forums aimed at fostering dialogue on increasing Jewish immigration to Israel. Coverage in Israeli media has connected these initiatives with broader efforts by Aliyah activists and volunteers to promote Jewish immigration and education about life in Israel.

=== Writing ===
In addition to his public activities, Wander is recognized for his prolific writing and international speaking engagements. He has authored hundreds of articles on topics including Zionism, Aliyah, Jewish identity, and contemporary geopolitical trends, which are published across a variety of platforms and read internationally. Wander has also been invited to address audiences throughout the United States, Canada, Europe, and Israel, speaking on issues related to Jewish destiny and the contemporary significance of Geula (redemption).

=== Attempt to revive the Sanhedrin ===
Wander has also been involved with initiatives connected to the modern effort to re-establish the Sanhedrin, a project launched in 2004 by a group of rabbis seeking to revive the ancient Jewish high court in Israel. The initiative aimed to recreate a rabbinical body of seventy one judges based on interpretations of Jewish law regarding the restoration of semikhah (rabbinic ordination). Wander has participated in activities and discussions associated with the movement, which has generated debate within Israeli religious and secular circles since its founding.

=== Red Heifers ===
Joshua Wander has also been involved in initiatives related to the search for a biblically valid red heifer (parah adumah), an animal required by Jewish law for the ritual purification process described in the Book of Numbers. He has participated in educational programs and public discussions on the subject, including a webinar on the history and significance of the red heifer organized by Israel365 News. In addition, Wander has been associated with efforts surrounding the importation of several red heifers from Texas to Israel in 2022 as part of a broader project linked to preparations for potential future Temple service. According to participants in the initiative, early discussions about bringing red heifers to Israel were held informally among activists and supporters, including conversations that reportedly took place at Wander’s home.

=== Korban Pesach initiatives ===
Wander has also been involved in initiatives supporting efforts to renew the korban Pesach (Passover sacrifice), an ancient ritual that has not been practiced in Rabbinic Judaism since the destruction of the Second Temple. In recent decades, various religious activist groups and organizations have promoted preparations for renewing the sacrifice, including educational reenactments, public demonstrations, and petitions to Israeli authorities to permit its performance on the Temple Mount.

== Political campaigns ==
Wander served as constable of White Oak, Pennsylvania and as an Allegheny County Republican committee member. He has run, unsuccessfully, twice for Mayor of Pittsburgh, and once for both Pittsburgh City Council and for Allegheny County Council. In the 2013 election for Mayor of Pittsburgh, Wander was the Republican nominee in a race widely regarded by political observers as a long-shot, given that the city had not elected a Republican mayor since 1933. Media coverage at the time characterized his candidacy as a symbolic or message campaign rather than a competitive bid for office. During the campaign, Wander publicly acknowledged the difficulty of winning as a Republican in Pittsburgh and made remarks reflecting the improbability of victory, which were reported in local media.

Less than two months before the election, while still the Republican nominee, Wander relocated with his family to Israel after selling his home in Pittsburgh. He stated that he intended to continue his campaign remotely, although legal and logistical questions about campaigning from abroad were raised by election experts in local press coverage. Wander received approximately 11.5% of the vote in the general election.

== Personal life ==
Wander is married with six children. Wander lives on the Mount of Olives and volunteers as a paramedic. He holds dual citizenship in the United States and Israel. He is a certified NRA arms instructor and gun rights advocate.

=== Doomsday Preppers ===
In an episode of the National Geographic Channel program Doomsday Preppers, Wander was quoted as saying that he was concerned "about a series of catastrophic terrorist attacks which will fundamentally change our lives as we know them." Wander maintained a blog titled "Jewish Preppers" where he wrote about disaster preparedness for Jews.

Republican nominee for Pittsburgh Mayor
Preceded by Mark DeSantis	Election of 2013	Succeeded by Tony Moreno
