= Bill Peduto =

American politician

60th Mayor of Pittsburgh
- In office January 6, 2014 – January 3, 2022
- Preceded by: Luke Ravenstahl
- Succeeded by: Ed Gainey

Member of the Pittsburgh City Council from the 8th district
- In office January 7, 2002 – January 6, 2014
- Preceded by: Dan Cohen
- Succeeded by: Dan Gilman

Personal details
- Born: William Mark Peduto; October 30, 1964 (age 62) Scott Township, Pennsylvania, U.S.
- Party: Democratic
- Education: Carnegie Mellon University; Pennsylvania State University, University Park (BA); University of Pittsburgh (MPA)

William Mark Peduto (born October 30, 1964) is an American politician who was the 60th mayor of Pittsburgh, Pennsylvania from 2014 until 2022. He was a Democratic member of the Pittsburgh City Council from 2002 to 2014.

Before his election to the city council, Peduto ran a political consulting business and later served as chief of staff to his predecessor on the city council, Dan Cohen. Peduto was elected to the council in 2001 and served from 2002 to 2014. He ran for mayor three times, winning the Democratic nomination and the general election in 2013 with 84% of the vote over Joshua Wander and Lester Ludwig. He was inaugurated in January 2014.

As mayor, Peduto is known for modernization and reform of city government, promoting economic development and innovation in Pittsburgh's technology sector, and guiding the city through crises including the Tree of Life Synagogue shooting and the COVID-19 pandemic.

In the 2017 election, he ran unopposed and was reelected with 96% of the vote. He ran for a third term in May 2021 but lost the Democratic primary to Ed Gainey.

== Early life and education ==
Peduto was born on October 30, 1964. He graduated from Chartiers Valley High School in 1983. After a year at Carnegie Mellon University, he transferred to Pennsylvania State University, pursuing a degree in political science and becoming president of the university's chapter of the Pi Kappa Alpha fraternity before dropping out. In 2007, Peduto returned to finish his degree requirements and became the only member of the nine-member Pittsburgh City Council at the time with a bachelor's degree.

Later, Peduto received a master's degree in public policy and management from the University of Pittsburgh.

== Career ==
Peduto operated a political consulting business and served as general consultant, campaign manager, finance director and other roles for several Democratic candidates and elected officials. At 28, he served as a political director for then Acting Governor Mark Singel. He also worked in Washington, D.C. as an intern to then U.S. Representative George Gekas.

Before holding a seat on the city council, Peduto served as chief of staff to former City Councilman Dan Cohen.

=== Pittsburgh City Council ===
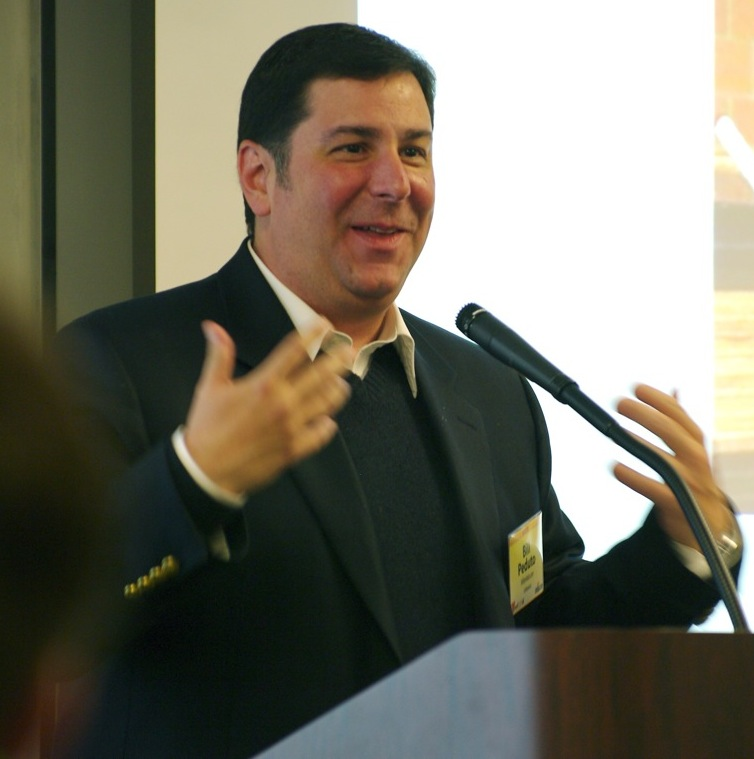
Peduto speaks at the Art Institute of Pittsburgh, 2009.

In the 2001 election, Peduto ran for the Pittsburgh City Council District 8 seat being vacated by Cohen, which represents the East End neighborhoods of Bloomfield, Friendship, Oakland, Point Breeze, Shadyside and Squirrel Hill. After being elected to a four-year term, he assumed office in January 2002. He was reelected in 2005 and 2009.

On the city council, Peduto chaired the Committee on General Services, Technology and the Arts, which is in charge of all contracts and purchases as well as city-owned buildings and land. He also oversaw the City Information Systems department, the Cable Bureau and the Art Commission on Council.

Peduto's accomplishments while on the city council concentrated on reform, development, and climate initiatives. Peduto introduced and passed legislation coordinated through the "Reform Pittsburgh Now" movement (itself founded by Peduto) including a prevailing wage act, a clean water act, a clean air act, campaign finance and lobbyist registration reform, and an ethics act.

Sustainability legislation authored by Peduto included one of the nation's first LEED incentive programs and the City of Pittsburgh's first Climate Action Plan. Much of Peduto's work on council prioritized improving and preserving Pittsburgh's urban forest; he founded the nonprofit Tree Pittsburgh and authored the Hillside Preservation Act. Such efforts, including launching the city's urban forest inventory, contributed to Pittsburgh's designation by the Arbor Day Foundation as a "Tree City USA."

As councilman, Peduto was credited with leading local efforts for the release of two political prisoners in China and Sudan. Along with then U.S. Representative Mike Doyle, Peduto secured communication with the Chinese government between 2002 and 2003 for the release of Xiaomei Jia from a forced labor camp in Beijing. In 2011, Peduto led efforts in Pittsburgh to advocate for the release of activist Hawa Abdallah Mohammed Salih from prison in Sudan. The letter he authored with Pittsburgh City Council was described as "a snowflake that causes an avalanche" that brought Salih's case international attention.

Peduto has called himself a proponent of progressivism and a "Reform Democrat." He was named one of "100 New Democrats to Watch" by the Democratic Leadership Council in 2003 and one of National Journal's "PA Up and Comers" in 2004 and 2006. He also received the Common Cause PA "Champion of Good Government" award in 2012.

=== First and second mayoral campaigns ===
Peduto launched his first campaign for mayor of Pittsburgh in 2005. He lost the primary to eventual general election winner Bob O'Connor. In 2006, after O'Connor died, City Council President Luke Ravenstahl became Mayor. In his second bid for mayor, Peduto mounted a primary challenge to Ravenstahl in the 2007 special election, but ended his campaign before the primary, acknowledging Ravenstahl's popularity.

Peduto became a political opponent of Ravenstahl's, opposing Ravenstahl's proposal to end Act 47 oversight of Pittsburgh's finances, among other issues. After being reelected to the city council in 2009, he again challenged Ravenstahl in the 2013 Democratic primary.

=== Mayor of Pittsburgh ===
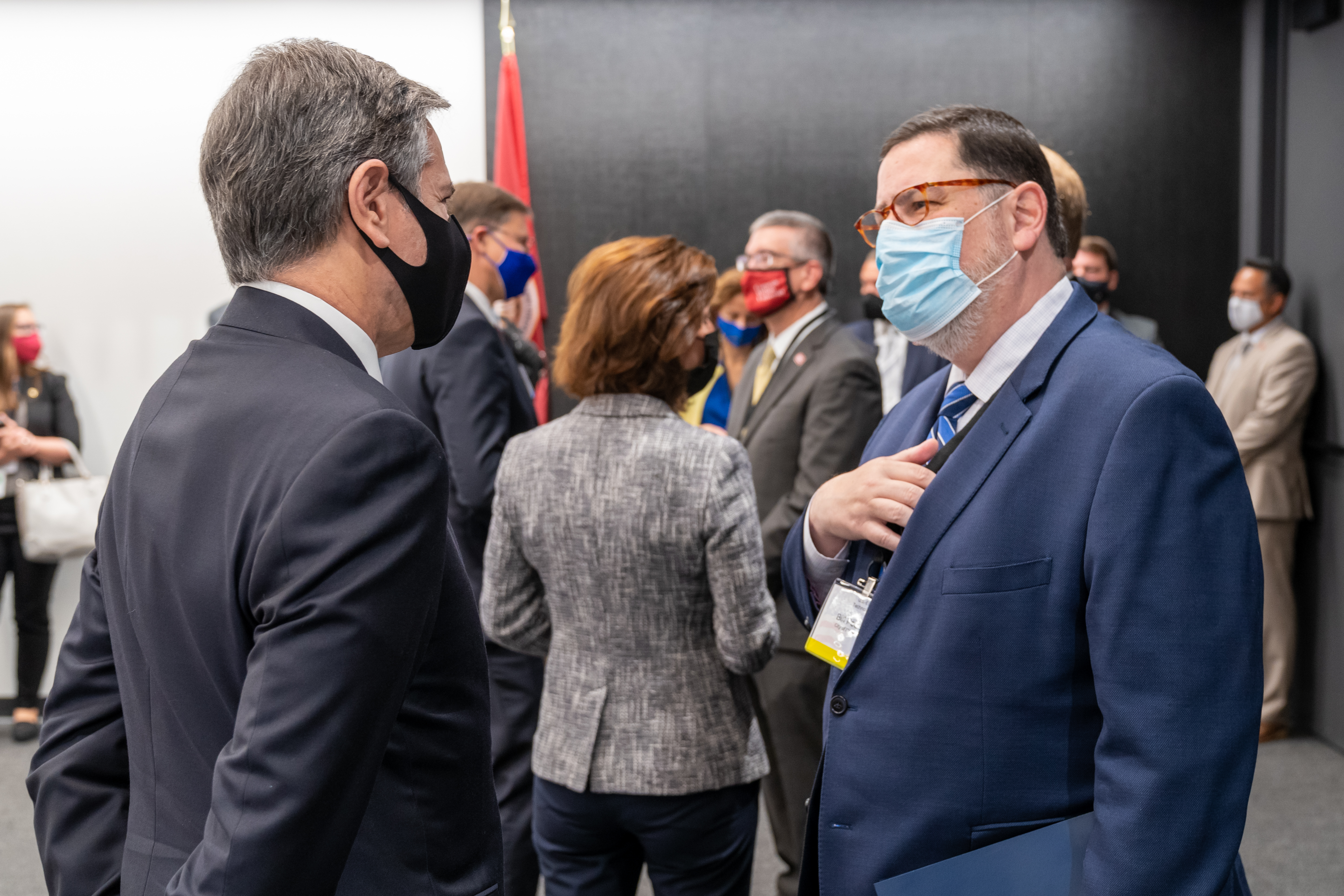
Peduto with Antony Blinken before the inaugural U.S.-EU Trade and Technology Council (TTC) meeting

==== 2013 election ====
In December 2012, Peduto officially launched his third mayoral campaign, announcing that he would challenge Ravenstahl in the 2013 mayoral primary, and was immediately endorsed by Allegheny County Executive Rich Fitzgerald. He simultaneously announced that he would not seek reelection to the city council. Ravenstahl announced in March 2013 that he would not seek another term as mayor. Several other candidates launched campaigns, but after Ravenstahl's exit, it became a two-way race between Peduto and former Pennsylvania Auditor General Jack Wagner. In the May 21 primary, Peduto defeated his opponents, receiving 52% of the vote. Wagner, his closest challenger, received 40%.

In November 2013, Peduto defeated Republican candidate Joshua Wander, who lived in Israel at the time of the election, and independent candidate Lester Ludwig, receiving 84% of the vote. He was inaugurated on January 6, 2014.

==== Administration ====
===== City government modernization and reform =====
Early in his term, Peduto made modernizing Pittsburgh's government a priority. Particular focus was given to the newly created Department of Permits, Licenses, and Inspections which replaced the former Bureau of Building Inspection. Prior to 2014, the Department had only 10 computers for 80 staff members and no online permitting. Today, the City of Pittsburgh has a fully online permitting system.

Peduto's efforts in favor of city government reform continued into his mayoral administration. Under his tenure, Pittsburgh was removed from Act 47 municipal financial distressed status after 14 years under oversight. Peduto's tenure brought the city's pension funded ratio from under 40 percent to over 60 percent, and he was credited for his efforts to turn around the city's deficit and pension crisis. Peduto's administration cut the city's debt in half and built a city reserve fund to around $120 million.

In early September 2014, Peduto announced the hiring of Cameron McLay as Pittsburgh Chief of Police, which resulted from an extended search following the resignation and subsequent conviction of Nate Harper on charges of tax evasion and slush fund conspiracy. Hiring McLay was among Peduto's first efforts in police reform in Pittsburgh through data-driven strategies and community policing.

Between 2019 and 2020, Peduto announced steps to turn around Pittsburgh's long-troubled Water and Sewer Authority. After making leadership changes and major investments, the Pittsburgh Water and Sewer Authority announced its lowest lead levels in 25 years.

===== Innovation and investment programs =====
Peduto was an early advocate for ride-sharing in Pittsburgh. After the Pennsylvania Public Utilities Commission issued cease-and-desist orders in July 2014, Peduto called on the state legislature to allow ride-sharing operators to legally operate in Pittsburgh. Subsequently, ride-sharing service Lyft acquired temporary approval for operation in August 2014 pending a hearing regarding a permanent license.

Peduto's administration prioritized partnership with Pittsburgh's large nonprofit "eds and meds" to secure their contribution to services and development in the city that could not be addressed by city government. In July 2014, Peduto and the City of Pittsburgh dropped a lawsuit that Ravenstahl had launched against UPMC, challenging its tax-exempt status. Peduto said the suit impeded progress in ongoing negotiations between UPMC and the city on taxes. Announced in 2021, Peduto's "OnePGH" plan committed a total of $115 million in contributions from the University of Pittsburgh, Carnegie Mellon University, UPMC, and Highmark toward "investments in children, the workforce, housing, health, the environment, recreation, mobility, infrastructure and culture."

Peduto's tenure also included record investments in Pittsburgh's parks system. He successfully pushed for the passage of a local parks tax referendum to support capital projects.

===== Economic development =====
In 2015, Peduto unveiled an initiative for city investment at an international summit in collaboration with the Heinz Endowments called p4, corresponding to metrics that evaluated new projects' contribution to "people, planet, place, and performance." Such metrics were used to evaluate, select, and standardize potential projects and provided a framework for job growth, neighborhood revitalization, and other city initiatives. The p4 initiative birthed several large-scale ventures including Pittsburgh Downtown Partnership’s Envision Downtown, Neighborhood Allies/Policy Link’s ”All in Pittsburgh,” the Brookings Institution’s Innovation District, and the p4 Performance Measures for Sustainable Development.

===== Climate and sustainability policy =====
Peduto prioritized innovative sustainability policies in Pittsburgh. He served as the North America representative to the Global Covenant of Mayors for Climate and Energy and on the board of ICLEI North America, committing Pittsburgh to the ICLEI Local Governments for Sustainability Network. He also committed Pittsburgh to carbon neutrality by 2050. Additionally, Peduto led the drafting and implementation of Pittsburgh's three Climate Action Plans.

In 2017, Peduto responded to a statement by President Donald Trump claiming that he "was elected by voters of Pittsburgh, not Paris" (in reference to United States' departure from the Paris Agreement). On Twitter, Peduto affirmed that Pittsburgh was committed to the guidelines of the Paris Agreement.

===== Tree of Life synagogue mass shooting =====
On October 27, 2018, a gunman killed eleven people and wounded six in the Tree of Life – Or L'Simcha Congregation synagogue in Pittsburgh's Squirrel Hill neighborhood, the deadliest antisemitic attack on a local Jewish community in American history. As mayor, Peduto led the emergency and recovery response, including organizing care for victims' families and advocating for gun control on national news media platforms. In 2024, he earned the Righteous Among the Neighbors award by the Holocaust Center of Pittsburgh for his leadership following the shooting.

===== Other activities =====
Peduto appeared on the CBS television series Undercover Boss in December 2014 as "Ed Chadwick". Following the premise of the show, Peduto disguised himself as a municipal worker to observe rank-and-file Pittsburgh employees.

On August 18, 2020, Pittsburgh residents protesting police brutality demonstrated outside Peduto's home, staying until 10 am the next day, when police officers declared the assembly unlawful. Later on the 19th, Peduto released a statement criticizing the protests, saying that any demonstration in his residential area "crosses a line that cannot be allowed to continue". The mayor's office later announced that Peduto would be at his home that evening to speak to protesters.

==== Reelection campaigns ====
Peduto announced on December 14, 2016, that he was running for reelection in 2017. He faced two challengers in the May primary: John Welch, a progressive minister who challenged Peduto from the left, and city councilwoman Darlene Harris, a longtime foe, who had not filed an official campaign organization. He defeated both to win the Democratic nomination, and did not face any Republican candidate in the general election, as none filed to run in the primary. Peduto was reelected with approximately 96% of the ballots cast on November 7, 2017.

In January 2021, Peduto formally announced his intention to seek a third term in the 2021 election. He lost the May Democratic primary to Ed Gainey in the wake of demonstrations against police brutality and systemic racism in 2020.

=== Post-mayoralty ===
In April 2022, Carnegie Mellon University announced that Peduto would join the university’s Heinz College of Information Systems and Public Policy as a Distinguished Executive in Residence. His duties included serving as a guest lecturer and co-teaching a course; he served through October 2025.

Peduto also established his own transatlantic consulting firm, Sabean Innovation, after leaving office. The firm advises government and nonprofit entities in North America and Europe on resilience strategies. He joined the staff of architecture firm AE Works as a strategic advisor in January 2026.

== See also ==
- List of mayors of Pittsburgh
- City of Pittsburgh
- Government of Pittsburgh

Political offices
Preceded by Dan Cohen	Member of the Pittsburgh City Council from the 8th district 2002–2014	Succeeded by Dan Gilman
Preceded by Luke Ravenstahl	Mayor of Pittsburgh; 2014–2022	Succeeded by Ed Gainey
