= Ed Gainey =

American politician

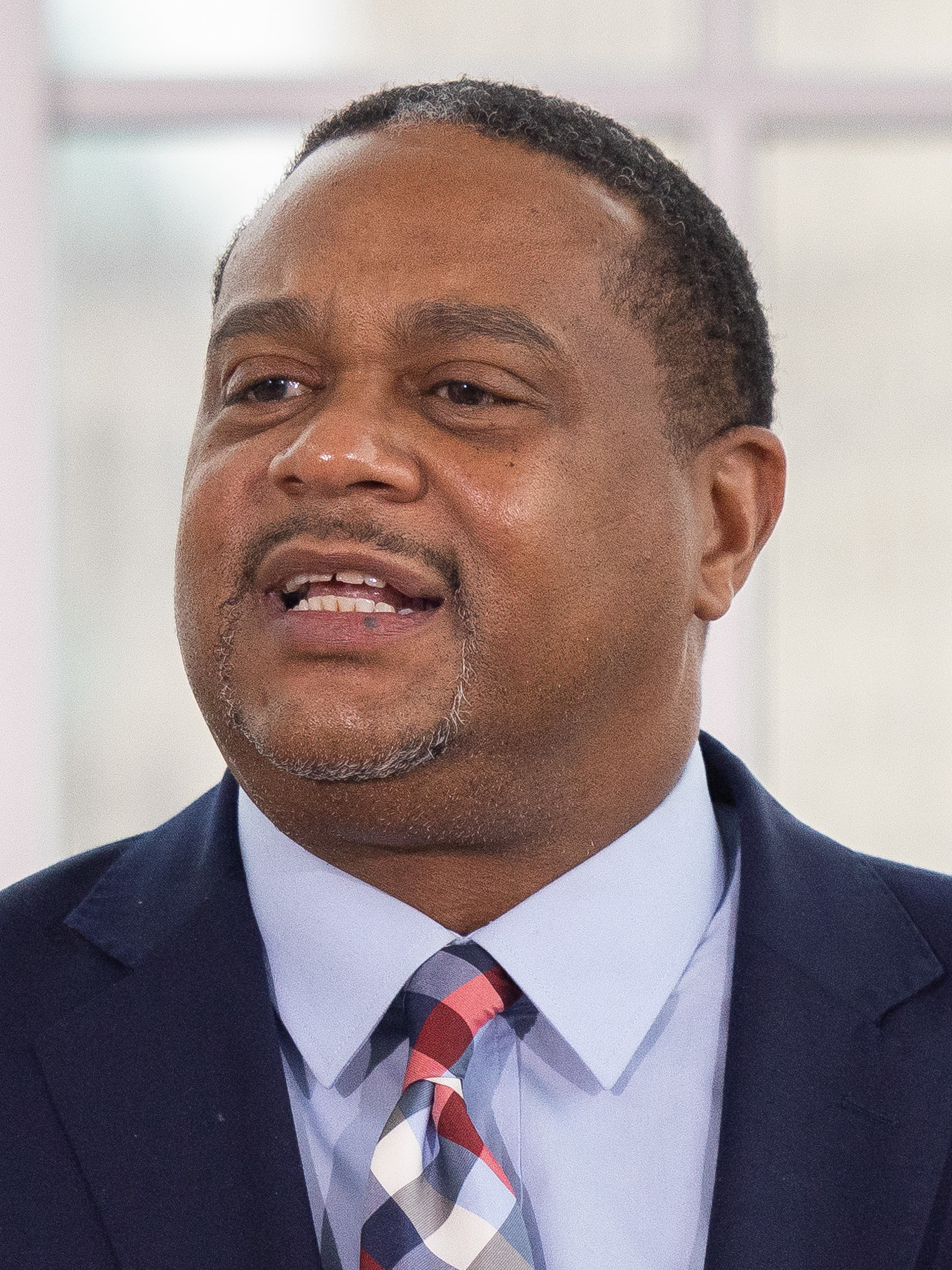
- Gainey in 2022

61st Mayor of Pittsburgh
- In office January 3, 2022 – January 5, 2026
- Preceded by: Bill Peduto
- Succeeded by: Corey O'Connor

Member of the Pennsylvania House of Representatives from the 24th district
- In office January 1, 2013 – January 3, 2022
- Preceded by: Joseph Preston Jr.
- Succeeded by: Martell Covington

Personal details
- Born: February 19, 1970 (age 56) Pittsburgh, Pennsylvania, U.S.
- Party: Democratic
- Spouse: Michelle Coburn
- Children: 3
- Education: Morgan State University (BA)
- Website: Campaign website

Edward C. Gainey (born February 19, 1970) is an American politician who served as the 61st mayor of Pittsburgh, Pennsylvania from 2022 to 2026. Previously, he served as a member of the Pennsylvania House of Representatives from the 24th district. In November 2021, Gainey became the first African-American to become the mayor of Pittsburgh and assumed office on January 3, 2022. He ran for a second term in the 2025 Pittsburgh mayoral election but lost in the Democratic primary on May 20th to Corey O'Connor.

== Early life and education ==
Gainey was born and raised in Pittsburgh by a single teenage mom with the help of her mother. When he was very young, the family moved from the Hill District neighborhood to Lawn Street in the South Oakland neighborhood, where they were the second black family to live on the street. When he was seven, the family moved to the East Liberty neighborhood. There he attended Peabody High School, where he played basketball, graduating in 1988. After high school, Gainey attended Norfolk State University for a semester before returning home to Pittsburgh, where he would transfer to the Community College of Allegheny County. After completing community college, Gainey attended Morgan State University. In 1994, Gainey graduated from Morgan State University with a Bachelor’s degree in business management.

== Career ==
Early on in his career, Gainey spent six years as a legislative aide to Pennsylvania State Representative Joseph Preston Jr. Gainey's early career also included a period as a special projects manager under Pittsburgh Mayor Tom Murphy. During this period, Gainey worked to promote economic development in East Liberty. Gainey and Preston's relationship later soured, and Gainey first posed a primary challenge to Preston in 2004. In 2006, Gainey challenged Preston for the second time, losing by 94 votes.

Gainey later took a position with the City of Pittsburgh under Mayor Luke Ravenstahl in a community development role. In 2010, he became chairman of the city's Democratic Party committee.

=== Pennsylvania House of Representatives ===
In 2004 and 2006, Gainey unsuccessfully ran for a seat in the Pennsylvania House of Representatives. In 2012, on his third attempt, Gainey defeated his former boss, Joseph Preston Jr., in a Democratic primary. Gainey represented the 24th District from 2013 to 2022. His district included many majority-Black neighborhoods in Pittsburgh, including Homewood, East Liberty, East Hills, and Lincoln-Lemington, plus the demographically similar adjacent municipality of Wilkinsburg. Gainey was a member of the Pennsylvania Legislative Black Caucus.

In 2014, while serving in the Pennsylvania state legislature, Gainey joined the board of directors of the Urban Redevelopment Authority of Pittsburgh (URA), Pittsburgh's economic development agency, eventually becoming vice chair.

=== Mayor of Pittsburgh ===
In January 2021, Gainey announced his candidacy for the Democratic nomination in the 2021 Pittsburgh mayoral election. Gainey's opponents included incumbent mayor Bill Peduto, who was running for re-election after two terms in office.

While Peduto won high-profile endorsements from institutional players, including eight out of nine members of Pittsburgh's City Council, as well as Allegheny County Executive Rich Fitzgerald and U.S. Representative Mike Doyle, Peduto and Gainey split endorsements from organized labor groups, and Gainey won the endorsement of the Allegheny County Democratic Committee and the Pittsburgh Post-Gazette. Gainey attacked Peduto's performance over his two terms as mayor, accusing the incumbent mayor of failing to pursue tax payments from nonprofit healthcare giant UPMC and of squandering an opportunity to improve police–community relations after the shooting of Antwon Rose.

In May 2021, Gainey ousted Peduto in the Democratic Primary 46% to 39%, becoming the Democratic candidate for mayor of Pittsburgh in November's general election. On November 2, 2021, Gainey defeated Republican nominee Tony Moreno with over 70% of the vote, becoming the mayor-elect of Pittsburgh Gainey assumed office as the 61st mayor of Pittsburgh on January 3, 2022.

=== Appointments ===
During his time in office, Gainey has appointed two people to the Urban Redevelopment Authority of Pittsburgh; Chief Economic Development Officer Kyle Chintalapalli and State Representative Sara Innamorato. Gainey has also appointed Olga George to his office as his press secretary. He has made nominations for the Commission on Infrastructure Asset Reporting and Investment as well, however, they are still pending as the commission fully vets the nominees.

== Personal life ==
Gainey lives in the Lincoln-Lemington neighborhood of Pittsburgh with his wife, Michelle, and their three children.

On January 22, 2016, Gainey's younger sister, Janese Talton-Jackson, was shot dead in Pittsburgh's Homewood neighborhood by a man who followed her out of a bar.

== Public safety ==
Gainey has pledged to make Pittsburgh the safest city in the U.S. Pittsburgh has seen a decline in homicides thanks to major crime units. Gainey has worked closely with the Pittsburgh Bureau of Police to hire more officers and reform training, and to standardize two new courses in Police Academy education. Mayor Gainey appointed a new Police Chief, Larry Scirotto, and he was formally sworn in as Police Chief in June 2023, after passing unanimously through the city council. Incumbent District Attorney (DA) of Allegheny County, Stephen Zappala, argues that the Office of Mayor Gainey has failed to properly enforce police practice. Incumbent DA Zappala threatened to take the matter to federal court.

== Additional policies ==
One of Ed Gainey's key policies is on climate change and environmental issues. Gainey has pledged to pass a lead ordinance, not privatize PWSA, and work with environmentalists to develop a plan to address climate change. Other policy areas he plans to address are transit and land use. Gainey has said that he will advocate for better public transportation options, including high-speed rail. He has also said that he supports inclusionary zoning, which would require developers to set aside a percentage of units in new developments for affordable housing.

=== 2024 budget proposal ===
Ed Gainey released his administration's 2024 budget proposal on September 29, 2023; the total was $155.5 million. The proposal calls for no new projects but instead is focused on completing the backlogged city projects. The proposal contains provisions to quadruple the funding allocated to bridge management as well as a 136% increase in traffic relieving amenities. The 2024 Pittsburgh budget has opened criticism to Gainey due to the tight margins the city will face in the following years of 2025-2026, as the city’s revenue is only $3 million above expected expenditures for those years.

== Electoral history ==
2021 Pittsburgh Democratic mayoral primary
Party	Candidate	Votes	%
Democratic	Ed Gainey	25,784	46.1
Democratic	Bill Peduto (incumbent)	22,029	39.4
Republican	Tony Moreno	7,390	13.2
Democratic	Michael Thompson	669	1.2
Write-in		116	0.2
Total votes		55,988	100

2021 Pittsburgh mayoral election
Party	Candidate	Votes	%
Democratic	Ed Gainey	50,165	70.8
Republican	Tony Moreno	20,162	28.4
Write-in		558	0.8
Total votes		70,885	100
Democratic hold			

2025 Pittsburgh Democratic primary
Party	Candidate	Votes	%
Democratic	Corey O'Connor	31,666	52.59
Democratic	Ed Gainey (incumbent)	28,355	47.09
Write-in		189	0.31
Total votes		60,210	100

Political offices
Preceded by Bill Peduto	Mayor of Pittsburgh; 2022–2026	Succeeded by Corey O'Connor
