= Fireboats of Pittsburgh =

Pittsburgh, Pennsylvania, one of the United States' most active inland water ports, has been serviced by multiple fireboats.

On December 16, 2016, the city placed an order for a modern fireboat, when recent waterfront fires, in 2015 and 2016, couldn't be fought properly without a fireboat.

From 1956 through 1973 the city operated the C.D. Scully. In 1973 Fire Chief Thomas Kennelly argued that the city didn't need a fireboat, that land-based crew and equipment could handle all fires. However, in November 2015 a luxury pleasurecraft caught fire, in the middle of a river, and even with its ladder trucks cranes at full extension, water from their hoses could not reach the boat. In May 2016 a large riverfront property went up in flames. Land-based crews could not get enough water pressure to fight the flames, where the powerful pumps of a fireboat could have provided the needed extra water pressure. So, on December 16, 2016, the city announced a contract to purchase a new, modern fireboat.

The new vessel will be christened the Sophie Masloff, in honor of Pittsburgh's first female mayor. It will enter operational service in September 2017, after enough firefighters have been trained.
