= 1959 Pittsburgh mayoral special election =

- November 3, 1959
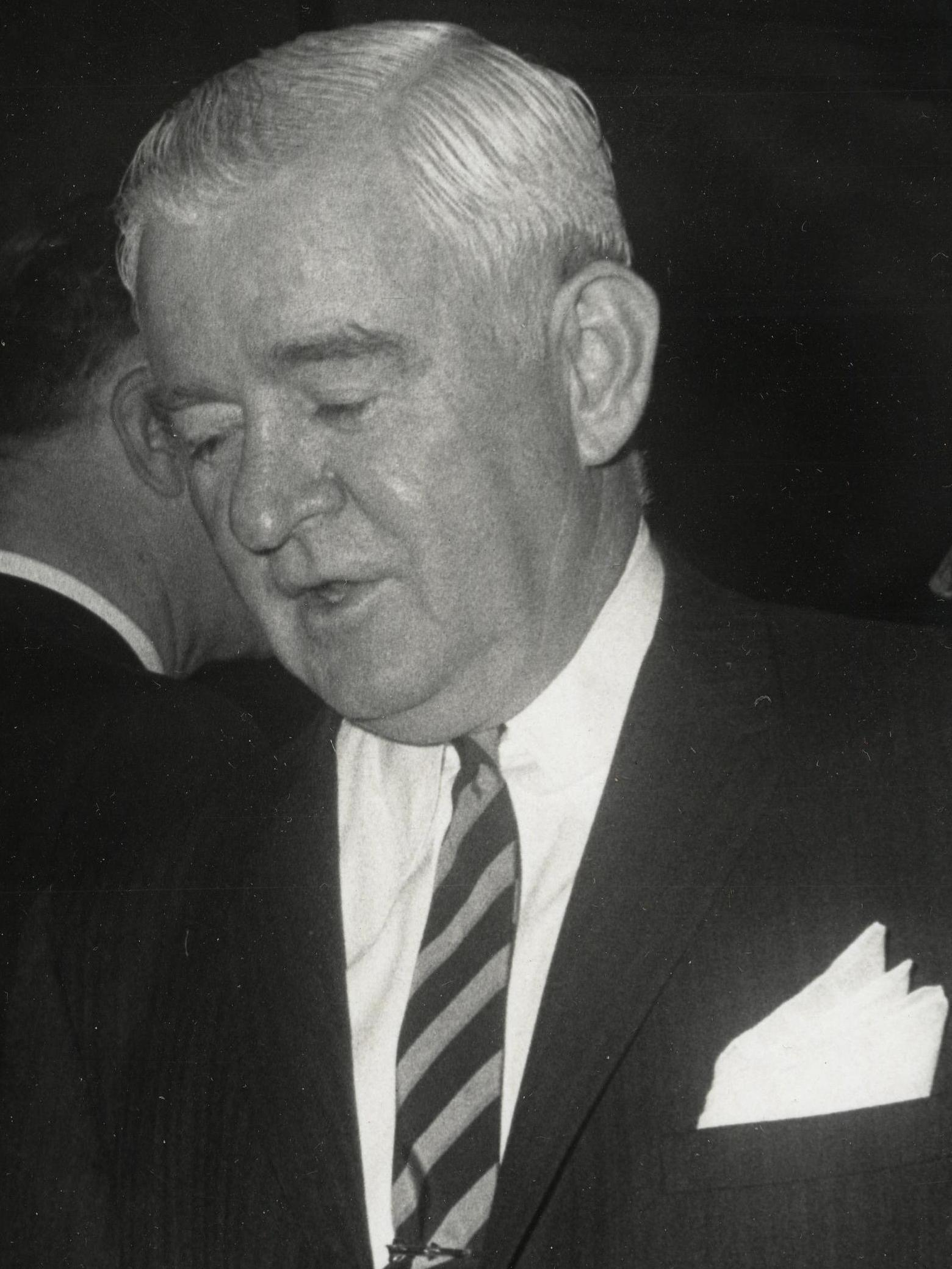

Nominee	Joseph M. Barr	Paul Reinhold
Party	Democratic	Republican
Popular vote	124,501	71,202
Percentage	63.6%	36.4%
Mayor before election
Thomas Gallagher
Democratic
Elected Mayor
Joseph M. Barr
Democratic

The 1959 Pittsburgh Special mayoral election was held on Tuesday November 3, 1959. The winner of the 1957 election, Democrat David Lawrence, had resigned from his position in January 1959 because he was elected Governor of Pennsylvania. City Council President Tom Gallagher moved up to the position of mayor per the city charter. At 75 years old, he chose not to seek reelection. Joe Barr, also a Democrat, won the special election and the remainder of Lawrence's term. Barr, a powerful State Senator and a longtime Lawrence associate, defeated Republican Paul Reinhold, the president of a company that distributed road repair equipment.

== Results ==
Pittsburgh special mayoral election, 1959
Party	Candidate	Votes	%	±%
Democratic	Joe Barr	124,501	63.6	
Republican	Paul Reinhold	71,202	36.4	
Turnout		195,703		
Democratic hold		Swing		

Preceded by 1957	Pittsburgh special mayoral election 1959	Succeeded by 1961
