= Joseph Barker (mayor) =

Mayor of Pittsburgh

Joe Barker
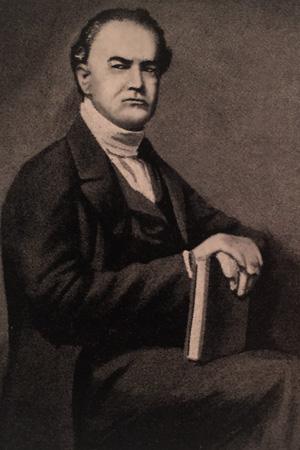
- Mayor Joseph Barker c. 1850

17th Mayor of Pittsburgh
- In office January 8, 1850 – January 1851
- Preceded by: John Herron
- Succeeded by: John B. Guthrie

Personal details
- Born: c. 1806 Pennsylvania, U.S.
- Died: August 2, 1862 (age 55/56) Manchester, Pennsylvania, U.S.
- Cause of death: Decapitation
- Resting place: Allegheny Cemetery
- Party: Write-In Candidate
- Spouse: Jane Holmes

Joseph Barker (c. 1806 – August 2, 1862) was an American public and political figure of the 1800s. He was notable for his rash, uncompromising temper, and violent tirades against corruption, often drawing large crowds, landing him in prison, and paving way for his term in office as the 17th mayor of Pittsburgh.

In 1862, Barker died in a train accident in the neighboring town of Manchester.

== Early years ==
The origins of Barker are shrouded in mystery. Nothing is known of his early years, background, or even his date of birth, as evident by its absence on his epitaph. Important, although sparse, details are provided in the information collected by the Census of 1850. Barker is listed therein as 44 years old and his birthplace is described as being in "Pennsylvania".

== Arrest, Trial, Imprisonment, and Election ==
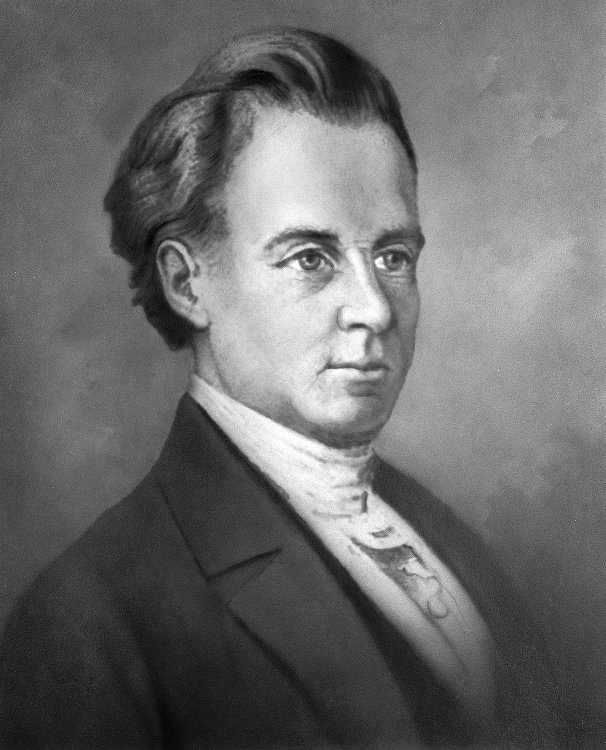
Portrait of Joseph Barker (circa 1850–1851)

Barker gained vast public attention and notoriety as a street preacher of the violent class, vehemently attacking political corruption. In November 1849, a riot broke out following one of Barker's more extreme tirades in The Diamond—present day Market Square, Mayor John Herron had him arrested on three counts:

1. Inciting a riot
2. Obstructing traffic
3. Using lewd and indecent language in the delivery of incendiary threats

=== Trial of the street preachers ===
==== November 5, 1850 ====
The Commonwealth v. Joseph Barker, Hugh Kirkland, and John Sharpe

The defining trial of Barker's life began on Monday, November 5, 1850, and was presided over by the President Judge, Benjamin Patton, with Samuel Jones and William Kerr serving as associate judges. H.S. Magraw, Esq. and James K. Kennedy prosecuted the case. The defense for Barker and Sharpe included a Mr. Eyster, as well as Jasper E. Bradley, of Franklin County. Hugh Kirkland stated he would represent himself. The jury was composed of the following members: William G. Miller, William Caldwell, Mathew Harbison, Jr, John Stonopher, James Taggart, Francis McClure, John Weller, David Bryson, Richard Black, Joseph Campbell, Adam Walter, and James Campbell.

The proceedings began with Kirkland asking the court if it was the appropriate moment to quash the indictment. He was told that it was and then began a lengthy argument regarding the illegality of the indictment. The court told Kirkland that his request to quash the indictment was overruled.

James Kennedy began the opening statements for the prosecution, concluding by calling upon his first witness, John Wynne.

===== Testimony for he prosecution =====
1. John Wynne (sworn) - Mr. Wynne stated that he was acquainted by sight alone with Kirkland and Sharpe, but personally knew Barker, and stated he had attended their lectures in the Diamond bi-weekly for a little over a year. He stated additional locations for the sermons were Penn Street, the Canal Bridge, and the steps of Leech's warehouse. He stated during these events the streets would be blocked to a degree which rendered them impassible — At this time Mr. McGraw asked Wynne if he heard any obscene language being used. Mr. Bradley, of the defense, objected and stated that no law prohibits free-speech on a public street but McGraw countered with legal authorities of the offense. The court overruled Bradley's objection — Wynne resumed his testimony, detailing that Barker made use of many expressions that were too terrible to be recorded in the court transcript. When cross-examined Wynne stated that while people could not get by conveniently, the crowd did move to allow the omnibus to pass. Wynne admitted that he was able to testify to this information due to his being attracted to what was said in Barker's speeches.
2. John Alexander (sworn) - Mr. Alexander stated that he conducts business in the Diamond, and has seen Barker there addressing crowds numbering in the hundreds. He stated that the streets were so obstructed that he had to relocate his place of business. When cross-examined Alexander stated that over time he had heard a few other individuals, in addition to Barker, also speak from the square.
3. W.H. Garrard (sworn) - Mr. Garrard stated his place of business is located three doors down from the Diamond, on Market Street, and that he was witnessed Barker's meetings take place in the center of the Diamond for one to two years. He stated that when Barker use to deliver his lectures from the steps of the Old Court House, the streets were blocked entirely. Garrard stated that he was not able to testify as to the language used at Barker's lectures, as he tried to move past them as quickly as possible. When cross-examined Garrard said that while he could not move through the crowd conveniently, he could push his way through.
4. Messrs. W.H. Whitney, James Owston, John B. McFadden, W.F. Willock, Hillary Brunot, J.K. Kennedy, and James McClain (sworn) - all testified to the fact that meetings led by Barker took place in the Diamond, to an extent to which the streets were obstructed. Several of the aforementioned witnesses stated that they heard the delivery of indecent language by Barker.
5. Dr. Robert Hazlett (sworn) - Dr. Hazlett stated that he had witnessed the meetings taking place for the past two years, and stated that he had seen the defendants delivering lectures on Sundays. Hazlett testified that he saw Barker use very lewd and obscene expressions.
6. William B. Thompson (sworn) - Mr Thompson stated he lives on Penn Street, opposite to where the meetings were held, and stated the gathering were large. Thompson stated he heard language which would be considered obscene in the presence of a woman or child. When cross-examined, Thompson stated that the language would be obscene in a private room.
7. Alexander Lowry (sworn) - Mr. Lowry stated that he attended the meetings where Barker spoke, and had heard obscene language used. Lowry testified that Barker would read from certain books and comment on them, using indecent language, but added Barker would not say anything unless he could prove it. The books that were read from were Den's Theology, and St. Liguori.
8. Weston Bowen (sworn) - Mr. Bowen stated that he was a passerby to the meetings in the “Market House” several times, and he had witnessed obscene language and expressions used. Bowen described some of the aforementioned expressions to the court — After Mr. Bowen's testimony, Mr. Magraw called a large number of witnesses for the prosecution, none of which were present or answered. Several of them were granted attachments.
9. David Hunter (sworn) - Mr. Hunter stated that he attended several meetings, where he heard Barker using indecent language that he read from a book. Hunter testified that expressions were used that he cannot recall, and the title of the book Barker read from was Garden of the Soul; he could not recall the pages that were read from but stated that he once read from the book himself and could identify what Barker read.
10. Messrs. Murphy, James Dean, and Geo. Beale, Sr. (sworn) - Mr. Murphy, Mr. Dean, and Mr. Beale testified just about the same information as did Mr. Hunter.

After the testimony of Murphy, Dean, and Beale, the prosecution allowed the Defense to begin due to their remaining witnesses not being present, but reserved the right to continue if any more of their witnesses arrived in the court.

===== Testimony for the defense =====
Mr. Easter opened for the defense in a lengthy discussion of his belief in the illegality of the indictment, citing the charges as not being sufficiently specific.

1. Dr. John Rea (sworn) - Dr. Rea stated that he has witnessed Barker's meetings, and they have had attendances of about 150-200 people. Rea testified that while citizens could not access the sidewalk where the speakers stood, the other side was available to them. He stated the crowd extended to near the middle of the street.
2. William Bayne (sworn) - Mr. Bayne stated that he passes by the meetings every Sunday without ever experiencing annoyance from the crowds. Bayne stated that he may have seen the omnibuses stopped from time to time, but typically they went through the crowd.
3. Matthew Dalzell (sworn) - Mr. Dalzell stated that he has seen some of Barker's meetings and that horses and drays could get through the crowds without stopping, as the crowd would move out of the way.
4. George H. Thompson (sworn) - Mr. Thompson stated that he has witnessed several meetings and every time people and omnibuses were passing through the crowd multiple times without issue. Thompson testified people could not easily get near the proximity of the speakers.
5. Robert Forsyth (sworn) - Mr. Forsyth stated that he has been in attendance of every meeting of Barker's at the Diamond, as well as almost every meeting at the Market House, Penn Street, and Allegheny. Forsyth testified that the speaker—Barker—had always appointed men to keep the street clear and that he never witnessed a carriage be stopped. He stated that at Penn Street people could freely move to either side of the street, but the area near the speaker was congested.
6. Philip Snepler (sworn) - Mr. Snepler stated that he lives in the Diamond on the side of the old courthouse, and that he always witnessed people and omnibuses freely pass by without incident. Snepler testified that Barker's meetings were not the only meetings to take place in the Diamond, and that since he has lived there it has been a place for public gatherings and meetings.
7. Benjamin McLean (sworn) - Mr. McLean stated that he has passed by on market street during Barker's meetings and that people would separate to make room for the omnibuses to pass by, albeit slowly. McLean testified that it would be difficult to pass through the crowd if you were on the same side of the street as Barker, but added other individuals would also hold meetings there.
8. Samuel Cooper (sworn) - Mr. Cooper testified similar facts as Mr. McLean, but added that around six different types of meetings were held in the Diamond, in addition to Barker's. Cooper also stated that Barker would read from Den's Theology and St. Liguori during his speeches.
9. Dr. C. Armstrong (sworn) - Dr. Armstrong stated that he has witnessed Barker's meetings and has never been obstructed while passing by. Armstrong testified that the Diamond was used for meetings of several different sorts. When cross-examined Dr. Armstrong stated there was little difficulty in passing through the crowd and no great difficulty in getting to the other side.
10. Gabriel Adams (sworn) - Mr. Adams, former mayor of Pittsburgh, stated that he passed witnessed one meeting in the Diamond where Barker lectured and read from several books. Adams testified that he had no difficulty passing to the other side of the street through the crowd. Adams also noted he was called upon as a Police Magistrate in respect to these meetings.
11. John King (sworn) - Mr. King stated that he had been to sever of Barker's meetings and never had any difficulty getting through the crowd. King stated that he had never observed a carriage, buggy, or omnibus have difficulty getting the crowd to move and allow their passage.
12. S. Morrison, Esq. (sworn) - Mr. Morrison had attended some of the meetings and never saw any obstruction to people passing through the crowd. Morrison stated he heard Barker quoting from Garden of the Soul, Den’s Theology, and St. Liguori, and that the Diamond was a place for all types meetings. Morrison also testified at times the crowd's numbers would nearly fill the square of the Diamond, but that the attendees would always clear a path for approaching vehicles.

At this time the court adjourned for the day.

On November 19 the charges resulted in a fine and 12-month jail sentence, but Barker did not exactly display remorse, stating, "Judge Patton made a threat two weeks ago of what he would do if I was thrown into his power. Now let him touch me if he dares. I'll hang him to a lamppost if he lays a finger on me." The next mayoral election was fast approaching, and Barker's nativist supporters circulated a write-in petition during his imprisonment which resulted in his election as mayor to succeed Herron. Accounts of Barker's one-year 1850–51 term describe it as a period of religious and nativist strife.

== Personal life ==
The Census of 1850 mentions that Barker lived in Pittsburgh's Fifth Ward with his Irish-born wife Jane Holmes and three children, Charles Augustus, Eliza, and David, with his occupation being listed as "mayor". Contrary to propaganda spread by his enemies, and even incorrectly referenced in modern articles, Barker was far from illiterate.The 1850 census describes Barker as having a "silver tongue". As a perhaps sardonic nod to his opposition, Barker chose to leave the "sane" category on the census unchecked.

=== Appearance ===
Barker's appearance, in contrast to what was common of the era, was described as always cleanly shaven and well-dressed in nearly all black attire. It was said he was never to be seen without a neckcloth, black stovepipe hat, and long black cape.

== Death ==
Barker lived for eleven years after leaving the mayoralty and despite a number of additional attempts, never again held public office. He was in his mid-fifties at the time of his decapitation in a train accident in the neighboring town of Manchester (a part of Pittsburgh since 1908). Interment was in Allegheny Cemetery.

Preceded by John Herron	Mayor of Pittsburgh; 1850–1851	Succeeded by John B. Guthrie
