= 1965 Pittsburgh mayoral election =

- November 2, 1965
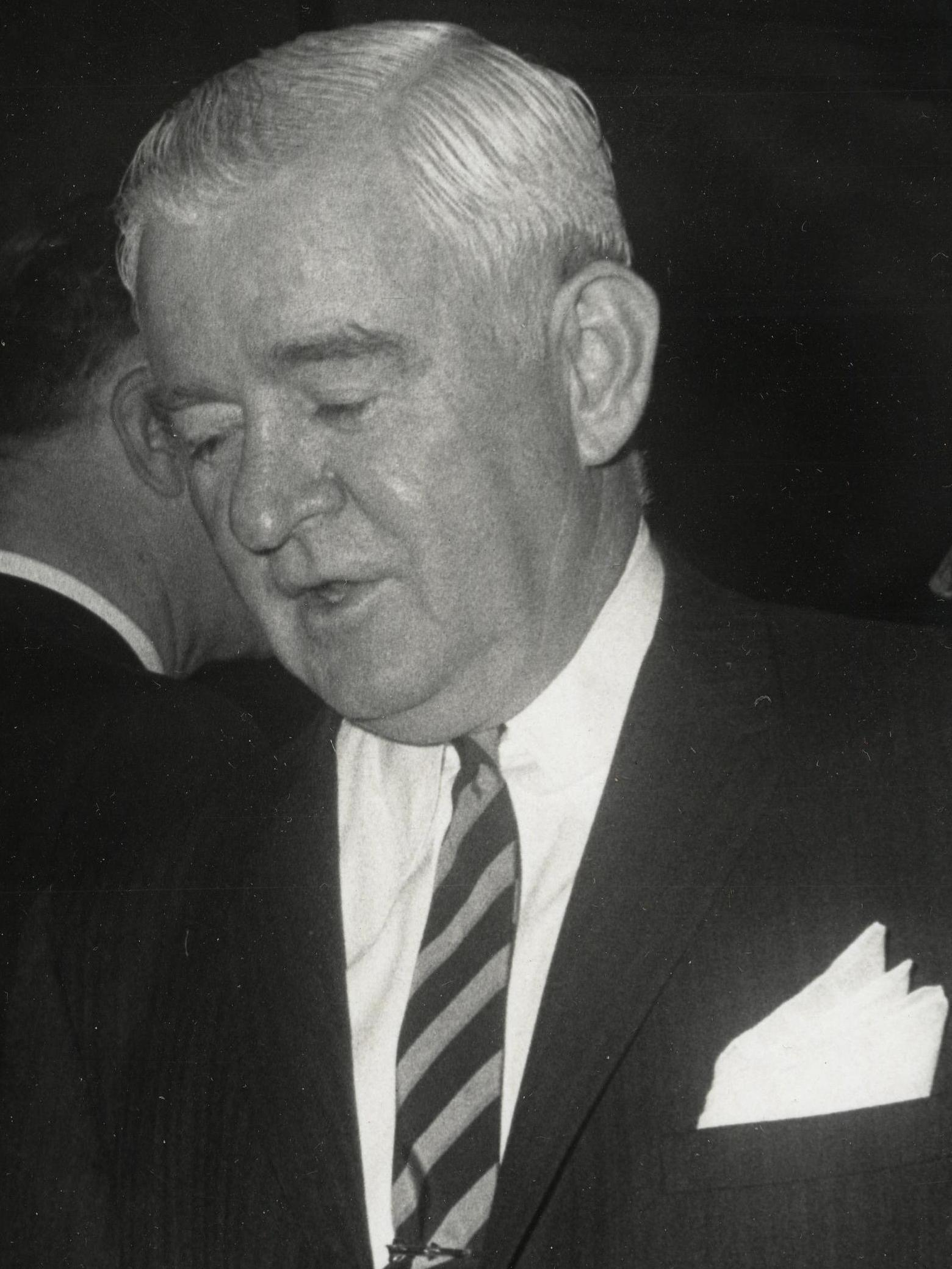

Nominee	Joseph M. Barr	Vince Rovitto
Party	Democratic	Republican
Popular vote	109,947	65,969
Percentage	62.5%	37.5%
Mayor before election
Joseph M. Barr
Democratic
Elected Mayor
Joseph M. Barr
Democratic

The Mayoral election of 1965 in Pittsburgh, Pennsylvania was held on Tuesday, November 2, 1965. The incumbent mayor, Joe Barr of the Democratic Party was victorious for his second term.

A total of 184,604 votes were cast. The 1965 race marks the last time that a Republican candidate was marginally competitive, as Barr defeated attorney Vince Rovitto by only about a 25% margin of victory. Subsequent Republicans have generally failed to achieve 30% of the total vote.

== Results ==
Pittsburgh mayoral election, 1965
Party	Candidate	Votes	%	±%
Democratic	Joe Barr (incumbent)	109,947	62.5	
Republican	Vince Rovitto	65,969	37.5	
Turnout		175,915		
Democratic hold		Swing		

Preceded by 1961	Pittsburgh mayoral election 1965	Succeeded by 1969
