= John Herron =

John Herron may refer to:

- John Herron (Pittsburgh politician), mayor of Pittsburgh, Pennsylvania in the 1840s
- John S. Herron, later mayor of Pittsburgh in the 1930s
- John Herron (Alberta politician), Canadian member of parliament from Alberta in the early 1900s
- John Herron (New Brunswick politician), former Canadian member of parliament from New Brunswick in the 1990s
- John Herron (Australian politician), former Australian senator
- John Herron (footballer), Scottish footballer
- John W. Herron, American judge

== See also ==
- John Heron (disambiguation)
