= 1993 Pittsburgh mayoral election =

- November 2, 1993
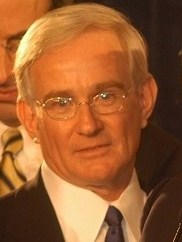

Nominee	Tom Murphy	Duane Darkins	Kathy Matta
Party	Democratic	Independent	Republican
Popular vote	57,172	13,271	12,058
Percentage	66.2%	15.4%	14.0%
Mayor before election
Sophie Masloff
Democratic
Elected Mayor
Tom Murphy
Democratic

The mayoral election of 1993 in Pittsburgh, Pennsylvania was held on Tuesday, November 2, 1993. The incumbent mayor, Sophie Masloff of the Democratic Party, chose not to run for re-election.

== Democratic primary ==
State Representative Tom Murphy, who had finished in second to Masloff during the previous election cycle's Democratic primary won the party's nomination, defeating City Councilman (and future Pennsylvania Auditor General) Jack Wagner. Murphy had been well regarded for his work in the legislature for projects designed to improve the unity and community feel of city neighborhoods. However, he also gain a reputation as being difficult to work with. Nonetheless, his previous run for mayor had laid a strong foundation for a primary win.

1993 Pittsburgh mayoral election, Democratic primary
Party	Candidate	Votes	%
Democratic	Tom Murphy	49,530	71.9
Democratic	Jack Wagner	19,338	28.1
Total votes		68,868	100

== General Election ==
A total of 86,414 votes were cast. Although Murphy won by a large margin, as is typical of Pittsburgh Democrats, he lost the city's black vote. City Councilman Duane Darkins, an activist for the short lived black progressive movement The Campaign for a New Tomorrow, ran on the platform of giving a voice to the city's minorities. Kathy Matta, a nonprofit director, was the Republican nominee.

Pittsburgh mayoral election, 1993
Party	Candidate	Votes	%	±%
Democratic	Tom Murphy	57,172	66.2	
Independent	Duane Darkins	13,271	15.4	
Republican	Kathy Matta	12,058	14.0	
Independent	Jeff Hitchcock	3,913	4.5	
Turnout		86,414		
Democratic hold		Swing		

Preceded by 1989	Pittsburgh mayoral election 1993	Succeeded by 1997
