= Senator McClintock =

Senator McClintock may refer to:

- Charlie McClintock (born 1970), Iowa State Senate
- Jonas R. McClintock (1808–1879), Pennsylvania State Senate
- Kenneth McClintock (born 1957), Senate of Puerto Rico
- Tom McClintock (born 1956), California State Senate

== See also ==
- James V. McClintic (1878–1948), Oklahoma State Senate
