= 1989 Pittsburgh mayoral election =

- November 7, 1989
Nominee	Sophie Masloff
Party	Democratic
Popular vote	56,688
Percentage	100%
Mayor before election
Sophie Masloff
Democratic
Elected Mayor
Sophie Masloff
Democratic

The mayoral election of 1989 in Pittsburgh, Pennsylvania was held on Tuesday, November 7, 1989. The incumbent mayor, Sophie Masloff of the Democratic Party chose to run for her first full term after having ascended the mayor's office from the position of President of City Council upon the death of long-time mayor Richard Caliguiri. While she met challengers in the Democratic primary (which she won), she was uncontested in the general election.

== Democratic primary ==
Masloff, a 71-year-old self-described "Jewish grandmother" had been involved with city politics for nearly half a century. However, after taking the position of mayor, her leadership abilities came under scrutiny; critics asserted that Caliguiri's aides were running the city, while Masloff was only a figurehead. With Masloff appearing vulnerable, a variety of top tier Democrats jumped at the chance to unseat her in the primary—the real contest in this heavily Democratic city. No Republican filed to run, so for all intents and purposes whoever won the Democratic primary would be the next mayor.,

Allegheny County Controller Frank Lucchino, who ran on a campaign emphasizing fiscal prudence, appeared to be the frontrunner in the race, and for many weeks leading up to the election, polled just a few points ahead of Masloff. Tom Murphy, a State Representative (who would become mayor in 1993), also proved to be a viable contender, as he emphasized how his economic knowledge could guide the city toward a more diversified economy. Two other candidates with strong appeal to particular groups complicated the race: Tom Flaherty (who is unrelated to former Mayor Pete Flaherty), the City Controller, had strong support from the city's police and fire unions, while attorney and longtime civil rights activist Byrd Brown had a base in the black community.

Masloff, who made many personal appearances and charmed voters with her colorful personality, took the lead in polling in the closing days and went on to take the nomination. Murphy, who characterized himself as a "high tech visionary," also found momentum late, as he finished in second and set himself up to be a future force in city politics; Lucchino's campaign faded as he continued to question Masloff's credentials. Byrd amassed less than 10% of the vote while coming in fourth; Flaherty finished last.

== General Election ==
Pittsburgh mayoral election, 1989
Party	Candidate	Votes	%	±%
Democratic	Sophie Masloff (incumbent)	56,688	100.0	
Turnout		56,688		
Democratic hold		Swing		

Preceded by 1985	Pittsburgh mayoral election 1989	Succeeded by 1993
