= 1997 Pittsburgh mayoral election =

- November 4, 1997
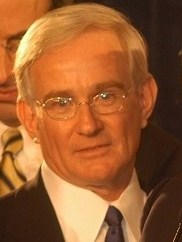

Nominee	Tom Murphy	Harry Frost
Party	Democratic	Republican
Popular vote	63,246	17,161
Percentage	76.9%	20.9%
Mayor before election
Tom Murphy
Democratic
Elected Mayor
Tom Murphy
Democratic

The mayoral election of 1997 in Pittsburgh, Pennsylvania was held on Tuesday, November 4, 1997. The incumbent mayor, Tom Murphy of the Democratic Party was running for a second straight term.

== Democratic primary ==
Murphy faced a difficult battle from City Council President Bob O'Connor, who would later go on to become mayor. The incumbent's popularity was waning due to his steadfast of two controversial measures: a tax to construct new stadiums for the Pittsburgh Steelers and Pittsburgh Pirates, and a faltering public-private partnership to purchase vacant Downtown storefronts. The battle was especially tense due to personality differences between the two men that led to frequently clashes over legislation.

1997 Pittsburgh mayoral election, Democratic primary
Party	Candidate	Votes	%
Democratic	Tom Murphy (incumbent)	35,557	53.6
Democratic	Bob O'Connor	26,652	41.7
Democratic	Chaston Roston	3,104	4.7
Total votes		65,313	100

== General Election ==
A total of 82,203 votes were cast in the general election. As is typical of races in Pittsburgh, the Democratic candidate won by a large margin over Republican Harry Frost, a construction executive.

Pittsburgh mayoral election, 1997
Party	Candidate	Votes	%	±%
Democratic	Tom Murphy (incumbent)	63,246	76.9	
Republican	Harry Frost	17,161	20.9	
Turnout		82,203		
Democratic hold		Swing		

Preceded by 1993	Pittsburgh mayoral election 1997	Succeeded by 2001
