= Jared Brush =

Jared Brush may refer to:

- Jared M. Brush (1814–1895), mayor of Pittsburgh
- Jared L. Brush (1835–1913), lieutenant governor of Colorado
