= 1961 Pittsburgh mayoral election =

- November 7, 1961
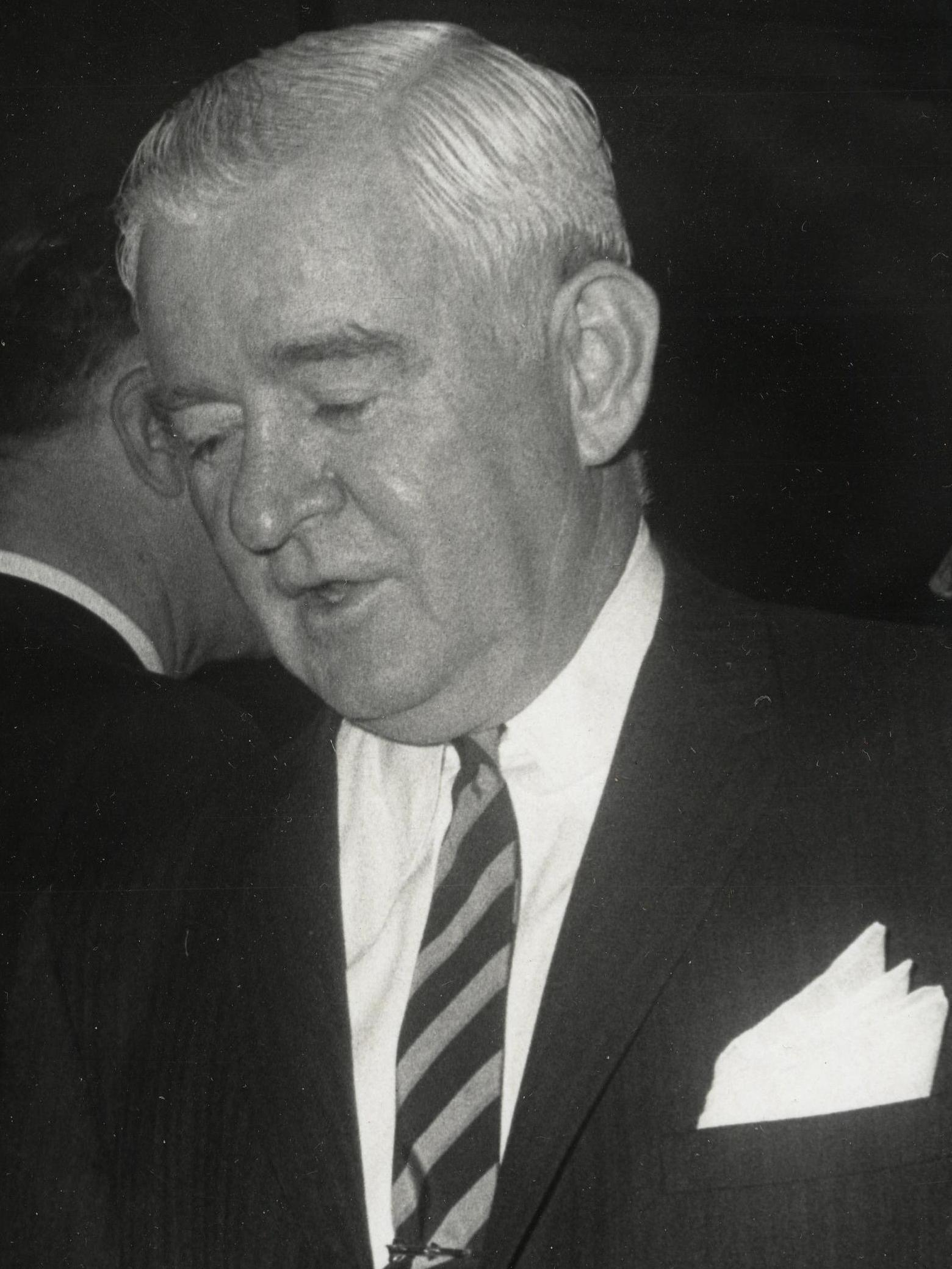

Nominee	Joseph M. Barr	William Crehan
Party	Democratic	Republican
Popular vote	124,082	60,522
Percentage	67.2%	32.8%
Mayor before election
Joseph M. Barr
Democratic
Elected Mayor
Joseph M. Barr
Democratic

The Mayoral election of 1961 in Pittsburgh, Pennsylvania was held on Tuesday, November 7, 1961. The incumbent mayor, Joe Barr of the Democratic Party won his first full term as mayor, after achieving the position in a 1959 special election. Barr received more than twice as many votes as his Republican opponent, insurance agent William Crehan.

== Results ==
Pittsburgh mayoral election, 1961
Party	Candidate	Votes	%	±%
Democratic	Joe Barr (incumbent)	124,082	67.2	
Republican	William Crehan	60,522	32.8	
Turnout		184,604		
Democratic hold		Swing		

Preceded by 1959	Pittsburgh mayoral election 1961	Succeeded by 1965
