= 2005 Pittsburgh mayoral election =

- November 8, 2005
| Nominee | Bob O'Connor | Joe Weinroth |
| Party | Democratic | Republican |
| Popular vote | 40,226 | 16,321 |
| Percentage | 67.09% | 27.22% |
- Results by ward O'Connor: 50-60% 60-70% 70-80% 80-90% 90-100%
Mayor before election
Thomas J. Murphy, Jr.
Democratic
Elected Mayor
Bob O'Connor
Democratic

The mayoral election of 2005 in Pittsburgh, Pennsylvania was held on Tuesday, November 8, 2005. The incumbent mayor, Tom Murphy of the Democratic Party chose not to run for what would have been a record fourth straight term.

Democrat Bob O'Connor won the election to become the 58th Mayor of Pittsburgh, but died nine months after assuming office.

== Democratic primary ==
Longtime City Councilman Bob O'Connor, who was defeated in the Democratic primary for mayor in the previous two elections, won nearly half the vote in a four-way contest. With outgoing executive Murphy deeply unpopular due to a 2003 budgetary crisis, O'Connor, a heated Murphy rival, emerged as the top candidate. His victory came against his legislative partner Bill Peduto (who would later become Mayor himself), City Controller Michael Lamb, and former Allegheny County Councilman Louis "Hop" Kendrick.

2005 Pittsburgh mayoral election, Democratic primary
| Party | Candidate | Votes | % |
|---|---|---|---|
| Democratic | Bob O'Connor | 28,812 | 48.96 |
| Democratic | Bill Peduto | 14,344 | 24.38 |
| Democratic | Michael Lamb | 13,114 | 22.29 |
| Democratic | Louis "Hop" Kendrick | 1,726 | 2.93 |
| Democratic | Lester Ludwig | 402 | 0.68 |
| Democratic | Gary W. Henderson | 288 | 0.49 |
| Democratic | Daniel F. Repovz | 157 | 0.27 |
| Total votes | | 58,843 | 100.0 |

== General election ==
The general election was uncompetitive, as is the standard in heavily Democratic Pittsburgh, as O'Connor won by 40 points against Republican attorney Joe Weinroth. A total of 59,961 votes were cast.

Pittsburgh mayoral election, 2005
| Party | Candidate | Votes | % | ±% |
|---|---|---|---|---|
| Democratic | Bob O'Connor | 40,226 | 67.09 | |
| Republican | Joe Weinroth | 16,321 | 27.22 | |
| Green | Titus North | 2,392 | 3.99 | |
| Independent | David Tessitor | 625 | 1.04 | |
| Socialist | Jay M. Ressler | 397 | 0.66 | |
| Turnout | | 59,961 | | |
| Democratic hold | | Swing | | |

| Preceded by 2001 | Pittsburgh mayoral election 2005 | Succeeded by 2007 |
