= Andrew Fulton (mayor) =

American politician (1850–1925)

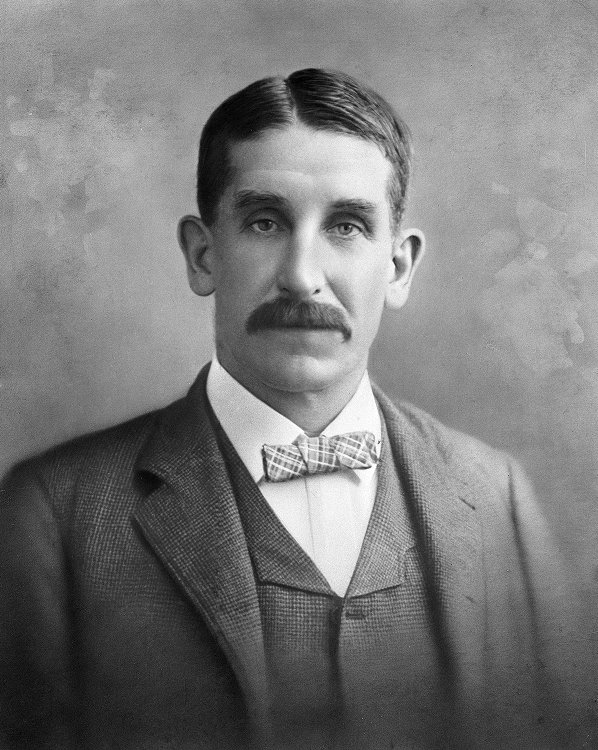
- Portrait of Andrew Fulton, c. 1884–1887

33rd Mayor of Pittsburgh
- In office 1884–1887
- Preceded by: Robert W. Lyon
- Succeeded by: William McCallin

Personal details
- Born: December 21, 1850
- Died: February 7, 1925 (aged 74)

Andrew Fulton (December 21, 1850 – February 7, 1925) was Mayor of Pittsburgh from 1884 to 1887.

== Early life ==
The son of Samuel Magee and Agnes Rebecca (Smith) Fulton, he was born in 1850 into a foundry family (the Fultons cast the bell for the old City Hall in Pittsburgh). He was extremely outgoing and affable and preferred the less formal "Andy Fulton", this charismatic charm as well as his tall stature served him well in a career of politics.

== Pittsburgh politics ==
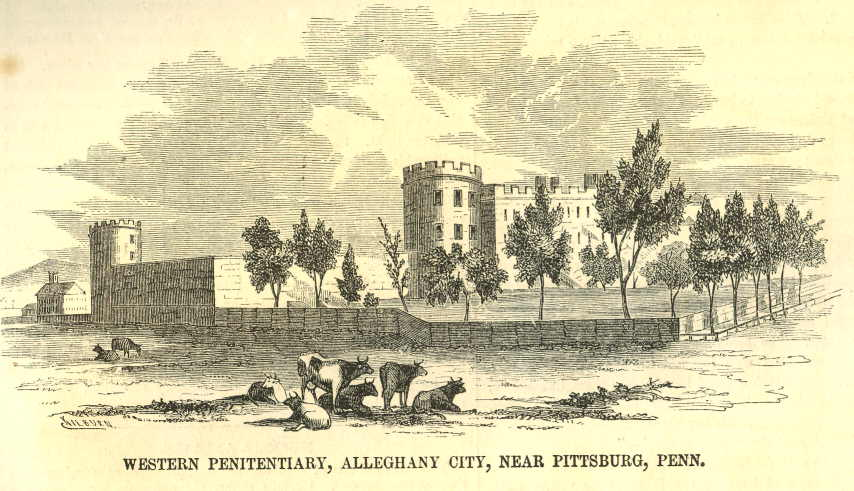
Western Penitentiary

In 1879, Fulton was elected to the City Council followed soon by his election to the mayor's office in 1887. Mayor Fulton oversaw the completion of the Western Penitentiary during his term. After leaving office he continued to stay active in Pittsburgh politics working on both the city and county levels, with the exception of an absence to Colorado to raise horses for a number of years.

== Scandal turned hoax ==
In 1888, Fulton was the victim of a hoax. Initially reported to have been fatally injured 20 miles outside of Denver, Colorado at the end of October 1888 when his wife shot him "at the cattle ranch of Emma Johnson, a noted sporting woman of Pittsburg" during a domestic dispute which allegedly arose from Fulton's longtime adulterous relationship with Johnson, during which Fulton allegedly fathered two children with Johnson (two girls, born circa 1865 and 1867), Fulton's reputation was restored somewhat when newspapers printed retractions several days later stating that the reports of Fulton's having been shot were false, citing as proof the fact that Fulton's wife had "not been out of the city [Pittsburgh] for some time" and could not, in fact, have traveled to Denver to shoot her husband.

By 1890, Fulton had parted ways with Johnson, and had relocated to New York; however, their alleged relationship continued to make headlines. In February of that year, Fulton again refuted accounts of his alleged relationship with Johnson. Although newspapers were reporting that Johnson was seeking a divorce from Fulton that year, in order to enable her to remarry, Fulton denied that he had ever married Johnson.

== Death and interment ==
In 1925, Fulton contracted pneumonia. He died on February 7 of that year, and was buried in the Allegheny Cemetery.

Political offices
Preceded by Robert W. Lyon	Mayor of Pittsburgh; 1884–1887	Succeeded by William McCallin
