= James Blackmore =

American politician (1821–1875)

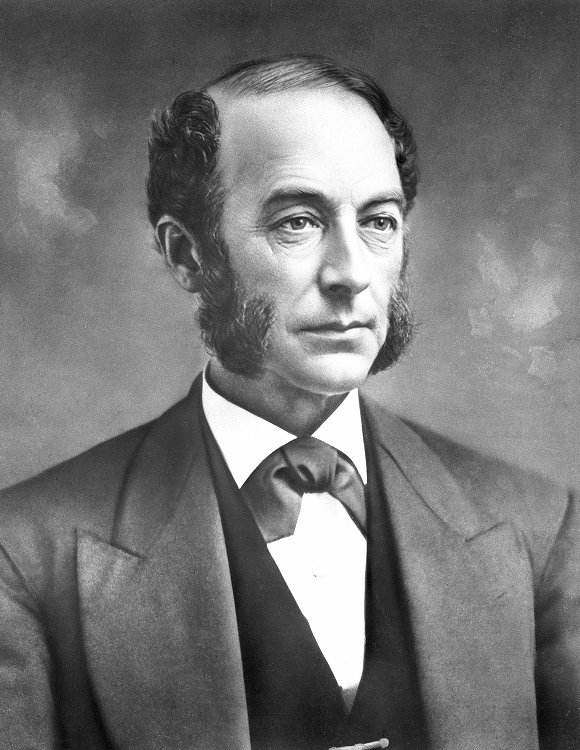
- Portrait of James Blackmore, c. 1868–1875

29th Mayor of Pittsburgh
- In office 1872–1875
- Preceded by: Jared M. Brush
- Succeeded by: William C. McCarthy

27th Mayor of Pittsburgh
- In office 1868–1869
- Preceded by: William C. McCarthy
- Succeeded by: Jared M. Brush

Personal details
- Born: February 2, 1821 Washington County, Pennsylvania
- Died: February 6, 1875 (aged 54) Allegheny County, Pennsylvania, Pittsburgh, Pennsylvania
- Spouse: Sarah Jane Blackmore
- Children: James Blackmore Jr, Henry Blackmore, Sylvanius Blackmore, Thomas Blackmore
- Occupation: Politician

James Blackmore (February 2, 1821 – February 6, 1875) was an American politician. He served as Mayor of Pittsburgh from 1868 to 1869 and 1872 to 1875.

== Life ==
Blackmore was born in 1821 in Washington County, Pennsylvania. His father was County Treasurer in 1855, and young Blackmore served as Chief Clerk. Mayor Blackmore was engaged in the lumber and coal business.

The city expanded east and George Westinghouse began manufacturing the air brake in the Strip District during Mayor Blackmore's initial term.

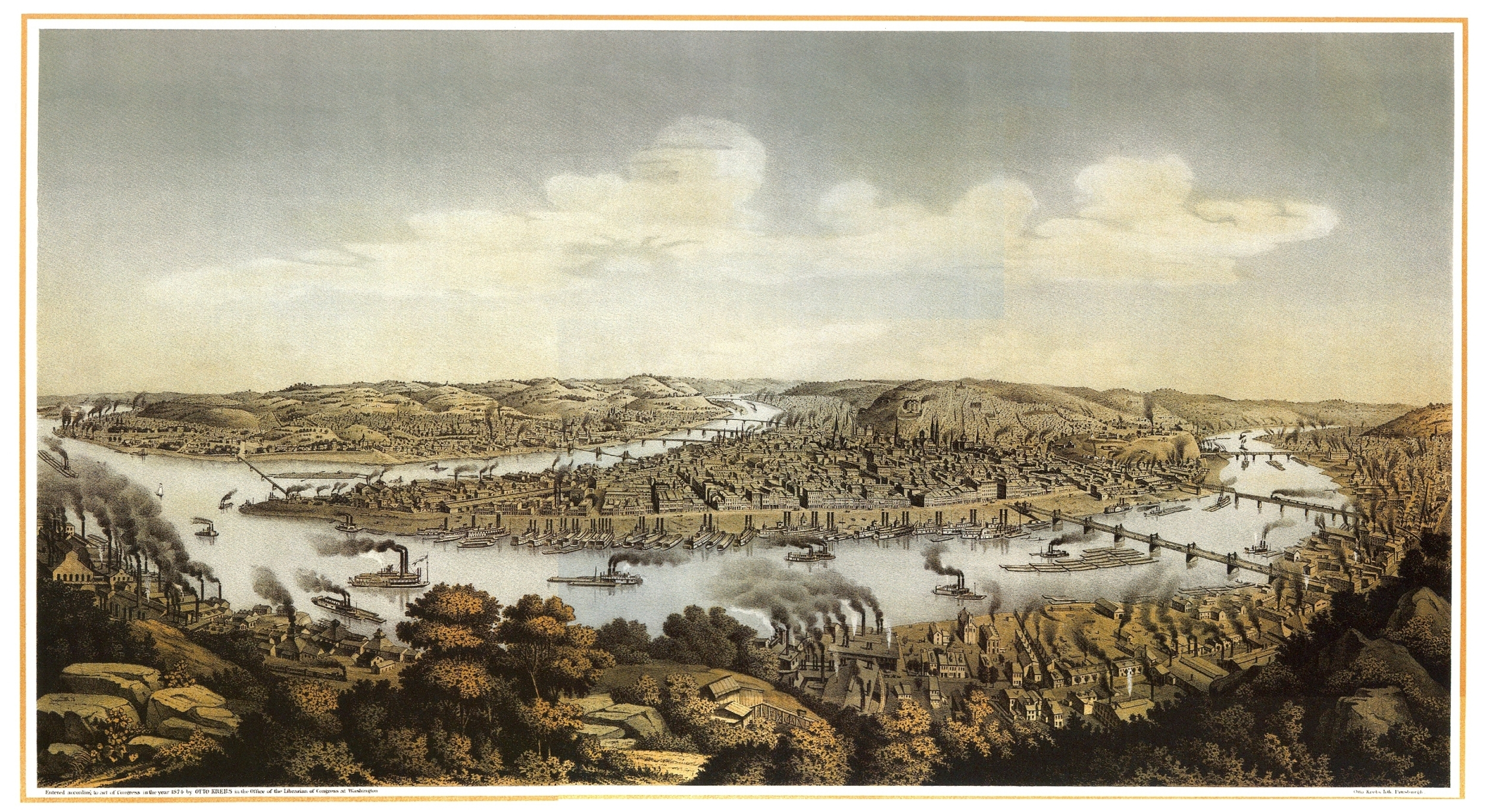
Pittsburgh in 1874, by Otto Krebs

A new City Hall was completed on Smithfield Street and the city's southern boundaries were extended during Mayor Blackmore's second term. James Blackmore's last address was 167 Wylie Avenue, Pittsburgh. His only child was called his name sake, James Blackmore Jr; it was unknown what he did for a living.

He died February 6, 1875, less than a week after finishing his term, and is buried in Allegheny Cemetery.

== See also ==
- List of mayors of Pittsburgh

== Sources ==
- James Blackmore at Political Graveyard
- Norman J. Meinert's list of plots in Allegheny Cemetery

Political offices
Preceded by William C. McCarthy	Mayor of Pittsburgh; 1868–1869	Succeeded by Jared M. Brush
Preceded by Jared M. Brush	Mayor of Pittsburgh; 1872–1875	Succeeded by William C. McCarthy
