= Barbara Burns =

Barbara Burns may refer to:

- Barbara Burns (Pennsylvania politician), member of the Pennsylvania House of Representatives
- Barbara Comstock (born 1959), née Burns, U.S. representative from Virginia
- Barbara Jean Burns (academic) (1941–2024), American academic, psychiatrist, and educator
