= Ferdinand E. Volz =

American politician

20th Mayor of Pittsburgh
- In office 1854–1856
- Preceded by: Robert M. Riddle
- Succeeded by: William Bingham

Personal details
- Born: 1823 Pittsburgh, Pennsylvania
- Died: May 14, 1876 (aged 52/53)

Ferdinand E. Volz (1823 – May 14, 1876), served as Mayor of Pittsburgh from 1854 to 1856.

== Biography ==
Volz was born in Pittsburgh, Pennsylvania in 1823. He served as water assessor from 1847 to 1851.

He was elected mayor on January 10, 1854 as a Whig, and holds the distinction as the city's last mayor from that party. During the one-year term that followed, Pittsburgh was hit by its worst cholera epidemic, and additionally suffered through a severe drought. Volz was re-elected as a fusion candidate, representing a coalition of Whigs and Democrats in opposition to the rapidly growing Know Nothing movement.

After an unsuccessful bid for a third term, Volz returned to his post as Water Assessor. In 1866, President Johnson appointed Volz as U.S. Collector of Revenue for Western Pennsylvania. He was also elected as Treasurer of the Allegheny Valley Railroad and served in that capacity until his death. Volz was an ardent Mason.

He died in 1876 and is buried in Allegheny Cemetery.

== See also ==
- List of mayors of Pittsburgh

Preceded by Robert M. Riddle	Mayor of Pittsburgh; 1854–1856	Succeeded by William Bingham
