= John B. Guthrie =

American politician (1807–1885)

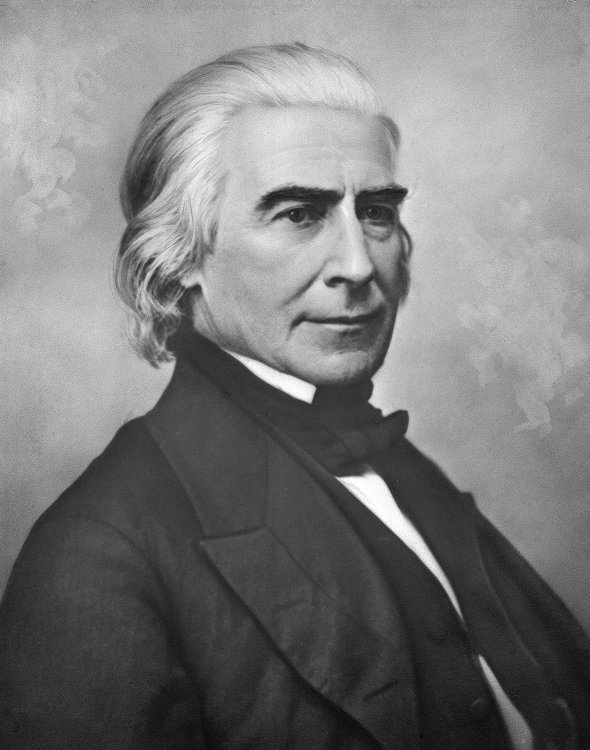
- Portrait of John B. Guthrie, c. 1851–1853

18th Mayor of Pittsburgh
- In office 1851–1853
- Preceded by: Joseph Barker
- Succeeded by: Robert M. Riddle

Personal details
- Born: July 28, 1807 Kittanning, Pennsylvania
- Died: August 17, 1885 (aged 78) Cresson, Pennsylvania
- Spouse: Catherine Murray
- Children: George W. Guthrie

Military service
- Allegiance: United States
- Battles/wars: Mexican–American War

John B. Guthrie (July 28, 1807 – August 17, 1885), a Democrat, was twice elected Mayor of Pittsburgh and served from 1851 to 1853.

== Biography ==
John Brandon Guthrie was born in Kittanning, Pennsylvania, the son of shipbuilder James V. Guthrie and Martha Brandon, daughter of Revolutionary War captain John Brandon. When Guthrie was young, his family moved from Armstrong County to Pittsburgh.

Guthrie married Catherine Murray, daughter of Magnus Miller Murray, the lawyer, businessman, and two-time mayor of Pittsburgh. Guthrie served in the Mexican War with the Duquesne Grays. He was appointed "Collector of Customs" for the port of Pittsburgh.

Guthrie served two terms as mayor. During his terms, he appointed a new police force who ended the lawlessness of 1851 in Pittsburgh. Guthrie was the father of George W. Guthrie, who would also serve as mayor.

Guthrie was a member of the Pennsylvania Constitutional Convention of 1872–73.

He died in 1885 in Cresson, Pennsylvania. He is buried in Allegheny Cemetery.

== See also ==
- List of mayors of Pittsburgh

Preceded by Joseph Barker	Mayor of Pittsburgh; 1851–1853	Succeeded by Robert M. Riddle
