= 2001 Pittsburgh mayoral election =

- November 6, 2001
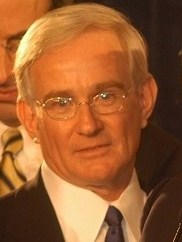

| Nominee | Tom Murphy | James Carmine |
| Party | Democratic | Republican |
| Popular vote | 39,257 | 12,175 |
| Percentage | 74.30% | 23.04% |
- Murphy: 50-60% 60-70% 70-80% 80-90% 90-100% Tie: 50%
Mayor before election
Tom Murphy
Democratic
Elected Mayor
Tom Murphy
Democratic

The mayoral election of 2001 in Pittsburgh, Pennsylvania was held on Tuesday, November 6, 2001. The incumbent mayor, Tom Murphy of the Democratic Party was running for a record-tying third straight term.

== Primary elections ==
Tom Murphy had a very close and personal primary battle with City Council President and future mayor Bob O'Connor. Murphy won the primary by just a few hundred votes, and in later years this primary battle was the subject of a U.S. Department of Justice probe. It was alleged but never proven in court that Mayor Murphy had a quid pro quo agreement with the powerful Firefighters union in the city, promising to exempt them from citywide budget cuts in return for "bought" votes.

Pittsburgh mayoral Democratic primary election, 2001
| Party | Candidate | Votes | % |
|---|---|---|---|
| Democratic | Tom Murphy (incumbent) | 32,683 | 48.31 |
| Democratic | Bob O'Connor | 31,984 | 47.27 |
| Democratic | Leroy L. Hodge | 1,659 | 2.45 |
| Democratic | Joshua Pollock | 1,094 | 1.62 |
| Democratic | Earl V. Jones, Sr. | 237 | 0.35 |
| Total votes | | 67,657 | 100.0 |

Pittsburgh mayoral Republican primary election, 2001
| Party | Candidate | Votes | % |
|---|---|---|---|
| Republican | James Carmine | 2,227 | 58.24 |
| Republican | Mark Rauterkus | 1,597 | 41.76 |
| Total votes | | 3,824 | 100.0 |

Legend
- Murphy 40-50%
- Murphy 50-60%
- Murphy 60-70%
- Murphy 70-80%
- O'Connor 40-50%
- O'Connor 50-60%
- O'Connor 60-70%
- O'Connor 70-80%
- O'Connor 80-90%
- O'Connor 90-100%
- Tie 40-50%

Legend
- Carmine 50-60%
- Carmine 60-70%
- Carmine 70-80%
- Carmine 80-90%
- Carmine 90-100%
- Rauterkus 50-60%
- Rauterkus 60-70%
- Rauterkus 70-80%
- Rauterkus 80-90%
- Rauterkus 90-100%
- Tie 50%
- No votes

== General election ==
A total of 52,839 votes were cast in the heavily Democratic city. As expected, Murphy won by a huge margin over James Carmine, a philosophy professor at Carlow University.

Pittsburgh mayoral election, 2001
| Party | Candidate | Votes | % | ±% |
|---|---|---|---|---|
| Democratic | Tom Murphy (incumbent) | 39,257 | 74.30 | |
| Republican | James Carmine | 12,175 | 23.04 | |
| Independent | Chaston Roston | 964 | 1.82 | |
| Socialist | Francis V. Forrestal | 443 | 0.84 | |
| Turnout | | 52,839 | | |
| Democratic hold | | Swing | | |

| Preceded by 1997 | Pittsburgh mayoral election 2001 | Succeeded by 2005 |
