= John Heron =

John or Jack Heron may refer to:

- John Heron (social scientist), British social scientist
- John Heron (MP), member of parliament for Northumberland
- Sir John Heron (courtier) (1470–1522), English courtier
- Jack Heron (cricketer), Zimbabwean cricketer
- Jack Heron (basketball), American basketball coach
- Sir John Heron, 2nd Baronet (1654–1693) of the Heron baronets

== See also ==
- John Heron-Maxwell
- John Herron (disambiguation)
