= William C. McCarthy =

American politician

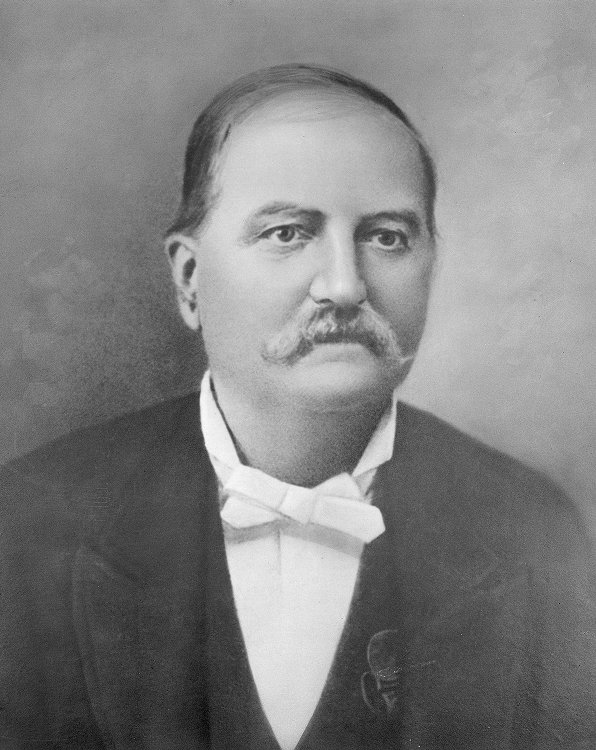
- Portrait of William C. McCarthy, c. 1866–1878

30th Mayor of Pittsburgh
- In office 1875–1878
- Preceded by: James Blackmore
- Succeeded by: Robert Liddell

26th Mayor of Pittsburgh
- In office 1866–1868
- Preceded by: James Lowry, Jr.
- Succeeded by: James Blackmore

Personal details
- Born: c. 1820
- Died: January 27, 1900 (aged 79/80)

William C. McCarthy (c. 1820 – January 27, 1900) was Mayor of Pittsburgh from 1866 to 1868 and from 1875 to 1878.

== Life ==
McCarthy was born in 1820. He was known as "Roaring Bill". His reputation as a volunteer fireman was legendary. McCarthy was a newspaper editor with the Pittsburgh Dispatch.

== Mayoralty ==
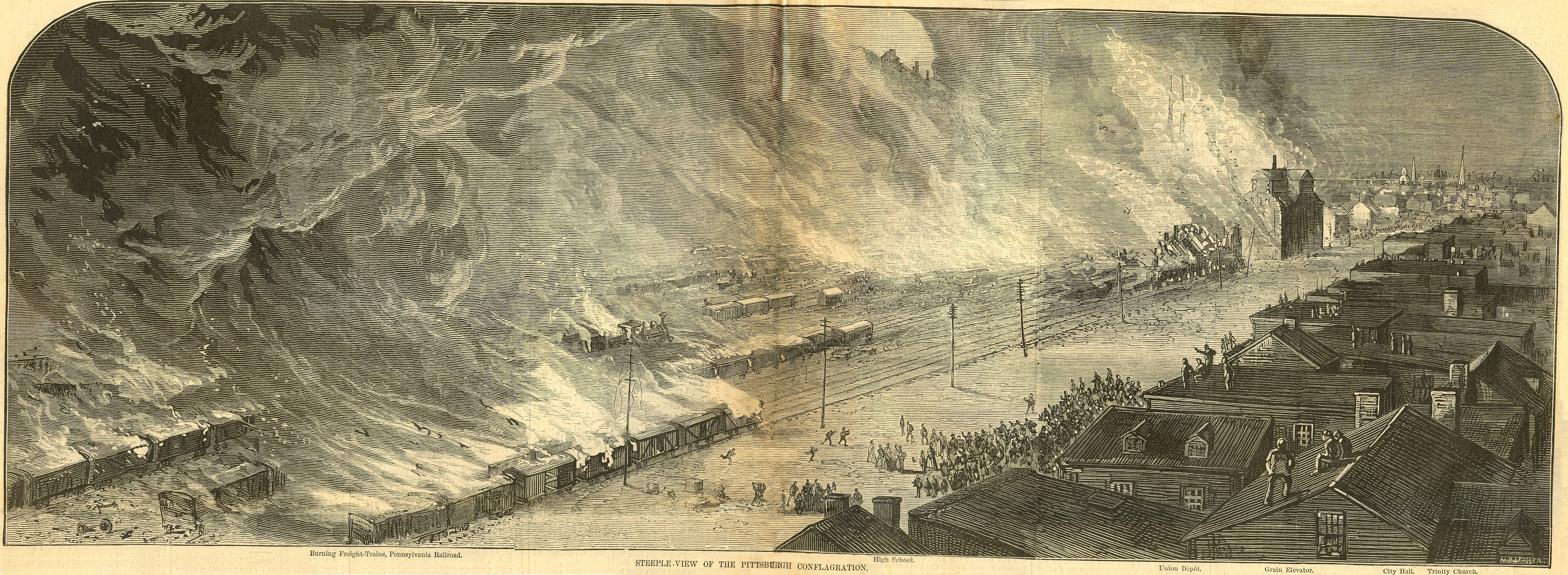
A Steeple-View of the Pittsburgh Conflagration, an engraving by M.B. Leiser

The Industrial Revolution was gearing up and Pittsburgh was annexing neighboring townships and boroughs. In 1868, Bloomfield became part of the city. During his first administration, the police department ceased orally assuring the citizenry "that all is well," and inclined planes began to ascend Mount Washington.

The Great Railroad Strike of 1877 occurred during his second term as mayor. Striking railroad workers clashed in a fierce battle with Philadelphia Militiamen at the 28th Street Roundhouse. Rail traffic was brought to a halt, and the terminal was burned.

McCarthy was elected City Controller in 1878.

He died January 27, 1900; and was buried in an unmarked grave in Uniondale Cemetery on the northside.

== See also ==
- List of mayors of Pittsburgh

Political offices
Preceded by James Lowry, Jr.	Mayor of Pittsburgh; 1866–1868	Succeeded by James Blackmore
Preceded by James Blackmore	Mayor of Pittsburgh; 1875–1878	Succeeded by Robert Liddell
