= 1957 Pittsburgh mayoral election =

- November 5, 1957
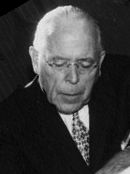

Nominee	David Lawrence	John Drew
Party	Democratic	Republican
Popular vote	128,532	68,644
Percentage	65.2%	34.8%
Mayor before election
David Lawrence
Democratic
Elected Mayor
David Lawrence
Democratic

The Mayoral election of 1957 in Pittsburgh, Pennsylvania was held on Tuesday, November 5, 1957. The incumbent mayor, David Lawrence of the Democratic Party won an unprecedented fourth term. Lawrence defeated former Court of Common Pleas Judge John Drew. For the third straight election, the powerful mayor gained quiet support from the Republican business community for his urban renewal projects, which compromised the GOP candidate's position.

== Results ==
Pittsburgh mayoral election, 1957
Party	Candidate	Votes	%	±%
Democratic	David Lawrence (incumbent)	128,532	65.2	
Republican	John Drew	68,644	34.8	
Turnout		197,176		
Democratic hold		Swing		

Preceded by 1953	Pittsburgh mayoral election 1957	Succeeded by 1959
