= Robert M. Riddle =

American journalist

19th Mayor of Pittsburgh
- In office 1853–1854
- Preceded by: John B. Guthrie
- Succeeded by: Ferdinand E. Volz

Personal details
- Born: August 17, 1812
- Died: December 18, 1858 (aged 46) Pittsburgh, Pennsylvania, U.S.
- Party: Whig
- Other political affiliations: Know Nothing, Republican

Robert M. Riddle (August 17, 1812 – December 18, 1858) was a newspaperman, postmaster and politician who served as Mayor of Pittsburgh from 1853 to 1854.

== Biography ==
Robert M. Riddle was born in 1812, the son of Judge James Riddle. He entered the mercantile trade in Pittsburgh in the firm of Riddle and Forsyth, and subsequently engaged in the banking business in Philadelphia.

In 1837, he became editor of the Advocate, a Whig newspaper in Pittsburgh. He served as the city's postmaster from 1841 to 1845. When his term of office expired, he took over the paper called the Spirit of the Age, and renamed it the Commercial Journal. He was connected to the paper as editor and proprietor until failing health near the end of his life forced him to retire from it.

While at the helm of the Journal, Riddle was elected on the Whig ticket as Mayor of Pittsburgh. He was not renominated at the end of his single-year term.

With the Whigs in steep decline, he moved to the American (Know Nothing) Party, and was active in pushing an anti-slavery agenda within that organization. He ended up a Republican.

== Death and interment ==
Riddle died of inflammatory rheumatism in 1858. He is buried in Allegheny Cemetery beneath a columned marker that may be the cemetery's only cast-iron monument.

== See also ==
- List of mayors of Pittsburgh

Preceded by John B. Guthrie	Mayor of Pittsburgh; 1853–1854	Succeeded by Ferdinand E. Volz
