= Bob O'Connor (mayor) =

American politician (1944–2006)

58th Mayor of Pittsburgh
- In office January 3, 2006 – September 1, 2006
- Preceded by: Tom Murphy
- Succeeded by: Luke Ravenstahl

President of the Pittsburgh City Council
- In office January 6, 1998 – January 7, 2002
- Preceded by: Jim Ferlo
- Succeeded by: Gene Ricciardi

Member of the Pittsburgh City Council from the 5th District
- In office January 6, 1992 – February 10, 2003
- Preceded by: Michael Coyne
- Succeeded by: Doug Shields

Personal details
- Born: Robert E. O'Connor Jr. December 9, 1944 Greenfield, Pittsburgh, Pennsylvania, U.S.
- Died: September 1, 2006 (aged 61) Shadyside, Pittsburgh, Pennsylvania, U.S.
- Party: Democratic
- Spouse: Judy Levine O'Connor
- Children: 3, including Corey

Robert E. O'Connor Jr. (December 9, 1944 – September 1, 2006) was an American politician who was the Mayor of Pittsburgh, Pennsylvania from January 3, 2006, until his death.

== Early life and career ==
Born in the Greenfield neighborhood, and a longtime resident of Squirrel Hill, O'Connor graduated from Pittsburgh's Taylor Allderdice High School in 1962 and was inducted into their alumni hall of fame in 2011. He worked briefly as a steelworker, and then entered the restaurant business. He eventually became executive vice-president of the Pappan chain of restaurants in the Pittsburgh area. He and his wife, Judy Levine O'Connor, had one daughter, Heidy Garth, and two sons, Terrence, who became a Catholic priest, and Corey, who represented the same district as his father from 2012 until 2022 and became mayor of Pittsburgh in January of 2026.

== Political career ==
O'Connor's political career began with his first election to Pittsburgh City Council in 1991. He served on the council under mayors Sophie Masloff and Tom Murphy.

He challenged Murphy in the Democratic primaries for mayor in 1997 and 2001. The 2001 race was especially contentious, as there was a five-way Democratic party primary. Both O'Connor and Murphy spent more than $1 million on their respective campaigns and in the end earned around 30,000 votes each in a very close race. O'Connor lost the race by 699 votes, and conceded the race several days after the primary.

In 1998, he was elected as city council president and later resigned from the city council in 2003 to work for Pennsylvania Governor Ed Rendell.

=== Mayoral election ===
In 2005, O'Connor did not face Tom Murphy, who decided to not seek a fourth term as mayor. O'Connor was able to raise the most money, collect many endorsements, establish the energetic and dedicated "Delta Team" led by Bob "Jabo" Jablonowski, and beat a group of challengers. Among the runners up in the May 17 Democratic primary were Bill Peduto, a member of the city council, and Michael Lamb, a County Row Office Holder. On November 8, O'Connor defeated Republican lawyer Joe Weinroth and, on January 3, 2006, he was sworn into office as mayor.

=== Legacy as mayor ===
While in office and after his death, O'Connor was widely referred to as "The People's Mayor." A lifelong sports fan, O'Connor took office soon before the Pittsburgh Steelers' win in Super Bowl XL.

During his brief tenure, O'Connor started the "Redd Up Pittsburgh" campaign. ("Redd up" is a Pittsburgh English term which means "to clean up" or "straighten up".), and strongly emphasized the positives of the city. Each month, from November 2006 to November 2007, local volunteer organization hosted a "Redd Up Pittsburgh" day in a different neighborhood to honor him. On November 17, 2006, the O'Connor family was presented with the Hall of Fame Shining Lights Award for the former mayor's "Redd Up Pittsburgh" initiative. He was the first to receive this award.

== Illness and death ==
O'Connor had been in office just six months when, in early July 2006, he complained of chronic fatigue and underwent multiple tests. On July 10, 2006, O'Connor was diagnosed with primary central nervous system lymphoma, a rare brain cancer. He began intense treatment, including chemotherapy, immediately. Though the prognosis was initially good, he experienced many complications including seizures and infections.

In August, his condition deteriorated. Yarone Zober, who had been recently appointed deputy mayor, served as acting mayor in his absence. During his illness, thousands of black and gold rubber bracelets, inscribed with the words "Bob O'Connor...Everybody's Mayor" and "The Leukemia & Lymphoma Society" were sold. The proceeds were earmarked to benefit The Leukemia & Lymphoma Society.

On September 1, 2006, at 8:55 pm EDT, O'Connor died at UPMC Shadyside Hospital, 24 hours after being removed from life support. He was 61 years old. City Council President Luke Ravenstahl became mayor in the wake of O'Connor's death. He was sworn in at 10:36 pm EDT at the City County Building in downtown Pittsburgh.

O'Connor's funeral and burial followed on September 7, 2006, at the Cathedral of Saint Paul and Calvary Cemetery, Pittsburgh, Pennsylvania. The grave is located in the south-west area of the cemetery in the Gethsemane section, lot 6, grave 5. The GPS coordinates are N 40° 24.770 W 079° 55.838. His son Terrence, a Roman Catholic priest, delivered the homily at the funeral Mass.

== Electoral history ==
- 2001 Race for Pittsburgh Mayor (Democratic Primary)
  - Tom Murphy (D), 48%
  - Bob O'Connor (D), 47%
  - Leroy Hodge (D), 3%
- 2005 Race for Pittsburgh Mayor
  - Bob O'Connor (D), 67%
  - Joseph Weinroth (R), 27%

Political offices
Preceded by Tom Murphy	Mayor of Pittsburgh; 2006	Succeeded by Luke Ravenstahl
Pittsburgh City Council
Preceded by Jim Ferlo	President of the Pittsburgh City Council; 1998–2002	Succeeded by Gene Ricciardi
Preceded by Michael Coyne	Member of the Pittsburgh City Council from the 5th District; 1992–2003	Succeeded by Doug Shields
