= William Bingham (Pittsburgh) =

American politician (1808–1873)

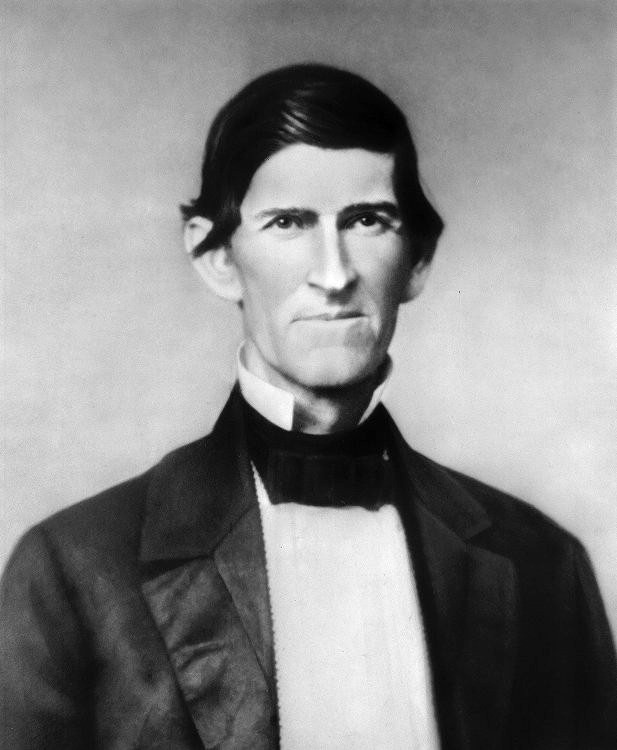
- Portrait of William Bingham, c. 1856–1857

21st Mayor of Pittsburgh
- In office 1856–1857
- Preceded by: Ferdinand E. Volz
- Succeeded by: Henry A. Weaver

Personal details
- Born: 1808
- Died: September 15, 1873 (aged 64/65)
- Resting place: Allegheny Cemetery

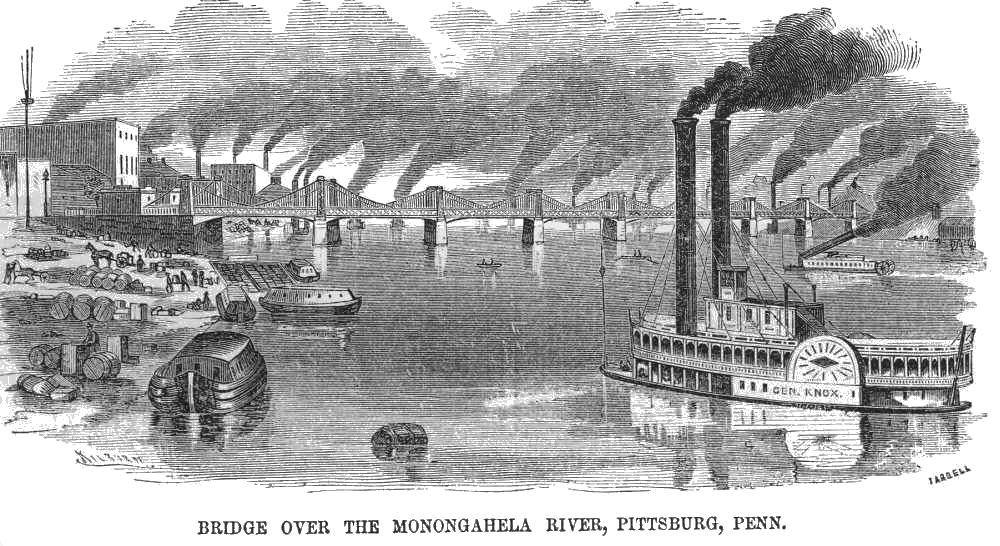
Pittsburgh in 1857

William Bingham (1808 – September 15, 1873), served as Mayor of Pittsburgh from 1856 to 1857.

William Bingham was born in 1808 and for most of his life was involved in the transportation business. The Bingham Brothers Company was a prosperous firm in the freight delivery industry. The Republican Party was formed in Pittsburgh during Bingham's administration.

Bingham died in 1873.

== See also ==
- List of mayors of Pittsburgh

Preceded by Ferdinand E. Volz	Mayor of Pittsburgh; 1856–1857	Succeeded by Henry A. Weaver
