= Samuel Pettigrew =

American politician

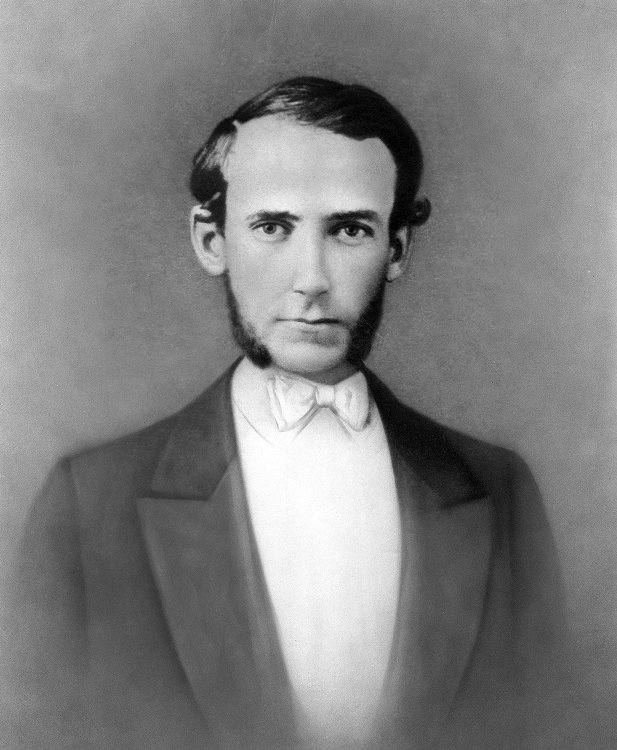
- Portrait of Samuel Pettigrew, c. 1832–1836

7th Mayor of Pittsburgh
- In office 1832–1836
- Preceded by: Magnus Miller Murray
- Succeeded by: Jonas R. McClintock

Personal details
- Born: Easton, Pennsylvania
- Died: 1841
- Spouse(s): Martha Barclay (1814–1823, her death); Charlotte Clayland (1824–1841, his death)

Samuel Pettigrew served as Mayor of Pittsburgh from 1832 to 1836, his administration was marked by the industrialization of the city. Pittsburgh celebrated its newfound might by christening the first steam locomotive in the mid-west aptly named "The Pittsburgh". Pettigrew contended with one of the city's first major disasters when a flood crested at 38.2 feet in February 1832. He was also both the last Pittsburgh mayor appointed by City Council and the first Pittsburgh mayor to win a general election outright by all the city's citizens.

Pettigrew married Martha Barclay in 1814, and she died in 1823. He married Charlotte Clayland in 1824. He died in 1841.

== See also ==
- List of mayors of Pittsburgh

Preceded by Magnus Miller Murray	Mayor of Pittsburgh; 1832–1836	Succeeded by Jonas R. McClintock
