= Robert Liddell (politician) =

American politician

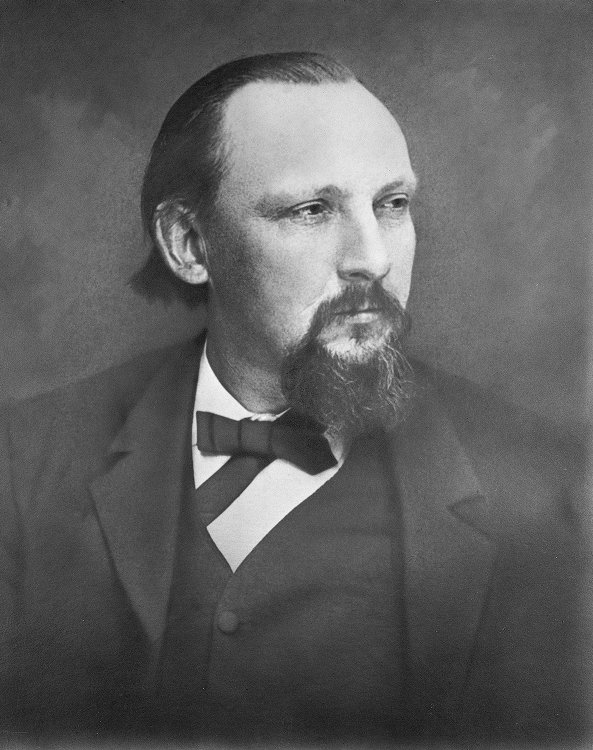
- Portrait of Robert Liddell, c. 1878–1881

31st Mayor of Pittsburgh
- In office 1878–1881
- Preceded by: William C. McCarthy
- Succeeded by: Robert W. Lyon

Personal details
- Born: 1837 England
- Died: December 2, 1893 (aged 55/56)

Robert Liddell (1837 – December 2, 1893) was Mayor of Pittsburgh from 1878 to 1881.

== Life ==
Robert Liddell was born in 1837 in England. He pursued the craft of beer making. During his administration, the Bureau of Water placed the Brilliant Pumping Facility into service.

In 1878, Holy Ghost Fathers started a college on the Bluff which would become Duquesne University. City streets were electrified in 1879 and Alexander Graham Bell's telephone went into limited use in Pittsburgh.

The city expanded west and south, annexing Mount Washington, Temperanceville and Birmingham. When Mayor Liddell left office, he was employed as a liquor dealer.

Liddell died in 1893; and was buried at the Union Dale Cemetery.

== See also ==
- List of mayors of Pittsburgh

== Sources ==
- Robert Liddell at Political Graveyard

Political offices
Preceded by William C. McCarthy	Mayor of Pittsburgh; 1878–1881	Succeeded by Robert W. Lyon
