= William Little (Pittsburgh mayor) =

American politician (1809–1887)

9th mayor of Pittsburgh
- In office 1839–1840
- Preceded by: Jonas R. McClintock
- Succeeded by: William W. Irwin

Personal details
- Born: August 8, 1809 Pittsburgh, Pennsylvania
- Died: August 26, 1887 (aged 78) Pittsburgh, Pennsylvania

William Little (August 8, 1809 – August 26, 1887) was mayor of Pittsburgh, in the US state of Pennsylvania, from 1839 to 1840.

== Early life ==
Little was born in Pittsburgh, Pennsylvania, in 1809. Early in his life, he belonged to the civic/vigilance committee The Duquesne Greys.

== Later life ==
After leaving the mayor's office he entered the private sector, developing a canal freight business in Ohio before moving further west and starting a successful furniture company in Iowa.

By the middle of the century he returned to Pittsburgh to manage the Monongahela Navigation Company. He was also treasurer of a local Pittsburgh bank.

He died in 1887 in Pittsburgh, aged 78, and is buried in Allegheny Cemetery.

Preceded by Jonas R. McClintock	Mayor of Pittsburgh; 1839–1840	Succeeded by William W. Irwin
