= Robert W. Lyon =

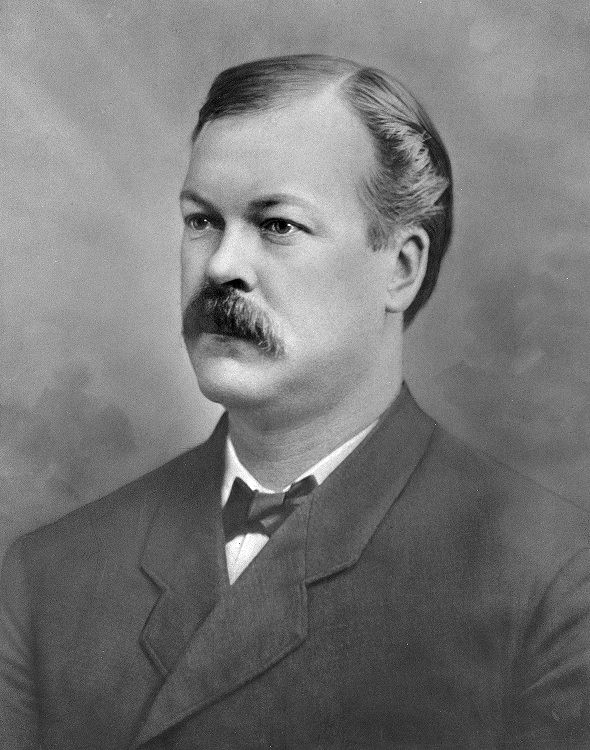
- Portrait of Robert W. Lyon, c. 1881–1884

32nd Mayor of Pittsburgh
- In office 1881–1884
- Preceded by: Robert Liddell
- Succeeded by: Andrew Fulton

Personal details
- Born: May 22, 1842 Butler County, Pennsylvania
- Died: October 9, 1904 (aged 62)

Robert W. Lyon (May 22, 1842 – October 9, 1904) was Mayor of Pittsburgh from 1881 to 1884.

== Early life ==
Mayor Lyon was born in Butler County, Pennsylvania north of Pittsburgh in 1842. He joined the 102nd Pennsylvania Volunteers during the American Civil War. When he came home from war Lyon made a small fortune in the petroleum industry.

== Pittsburgh politics ==
Mayor Lyon won election in 1881 and was best known as "the working man's mayor." He guided city hall into the completion of the Smithfield Street Bridge and the successful annexation of the Garfield neighborhood. The AFL, forerunner to the AFL-CIO, was founded in Pittsburgh under his administration.

In 1884, he went to work in a steel mill and worked in county government until his death in 1904. He was buried in Calvary Cemetery in the west suburb of McKees Rocks.

== Personal life ==
Lyon married Harriet Barclay (1841–1899) and they had 7 children.

== See also ==
- List of mayors of Pittsburgh

Political offices
Preceded by Robert Liddell	Mayor of Pittsburgh; 1881–1884	Succeeded by Andrew Fulton
