= Jonas R. McClintock =

American politician

8th Mayor of Pittsburgh
- In office 1836–1839
- Preceded by: Samuel Pettigrew
- Succeeded by: William Little

Member of the Pennsylvania Senate from the 22nd district
- In office 1854–1856
- Preceded by: George Darsie
- Succeeded by: William Wilkins

Member of the Pennsylvania House of Representatives
- In office 1850–1854

Personal details
- Born: January 8, 1808 Pittsburgh, Pennsylvania, US
- Died: November 25, 1879 (aged 71)
- Party: Democratic
- Education: University of Pittsburgh; University of Maryland Medical School (M.D.)
- Occupation: Physician

Jonas Roup McClintock (January 8, 1808 – November 25, 1879) was an American medical doctor and Democratic politician from Pennsylvania who served as the 8th Mayor of Pittsburgh from 1836 to 1839. He also served as a member of the Pennsylvania House of Representatives from 1850 to 1854 and the Pennsylvania State Senate for the 22nd district from 1854 to 1856.

== Early life and education ==
Jonas Roup McClintock was born in Pittsburgh, Pennsylvania in 1808 to John and Elizabeth (Roup) McClintock. He graduated from Western University of Pennsylvania, the forerunner to the University of Pittsburgh, and received a M.D. degree from the University of Maryland Medical School in 1830. He rose to local prominence due to his efforts in treating Pittsburgh residents during the cholera epidemics in the early 1830s. In 1832 he organized Pittsburgh's first board of health. He was a member of the local vigilance committee and Captain of the Vigilant Fire Company.

== Career ==
He became mayor of Pittsburgh at age 28. He was the youngest mayor in Pittsburgh (until Luke Ravenstahl) and was known affectionately as the "Boy Mayor". His administration established the Pittsburgh Police Department. He also implemented major infrastructure improvements in the city including the original "cut" of Grant's Hill, a steep bluff boxing the city in on the east. The "cut" allowed for settlement of an area of the city previously uninhabitable because of the grade of the land. The city also expanded during his time as mayor with the annexation of the Northern Liberties Borough.

He worked as a melter and refiner at the Philadelphia Mint from 1840 to 1847.

McClintock served as a member of the Pennsylvania House of Representatives from 1850 to 1854 and the Pennsylvania State Senate for the 22nd district from 1854 to 1856. As a state senator, he sponsored legislation which established free secondary education in Pennsylvania.

After leaving public service, he worked in the iron business and farming.

During the U.S. Civil War, McClintock help organize a troop company of over 3,500 men. He was the first captain of the 12th Pennsylvania Infantry Regiment also known as the Duquesne Grays.

== See also ==
- List of mayors of Pittsburgh

Preceded by Samuel Pettigrew	Mayor of Pittsburgh; 1836–1839	Succeeded by William Little
Pennsylvania House of Representatives
Preceded by	Member of the Pennsylvania House of Representatives; 1850-1854	Succeeded by
Pennsylvania State Senate
Preceded by George Darsie	Member of the Pennsylvania Senate, 22nd district 1854-1856	Succeeded by William Wilkins
