= John Herron (Pittsburgh politician) =

American politician

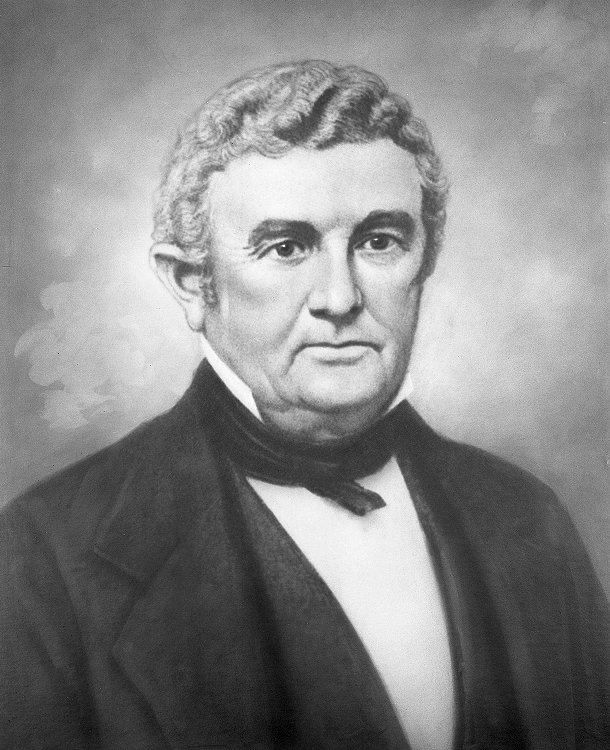
- Portrait of John Herron, c. 1849–1850

16th Mayor of Pittsburgh
- In office 1849–1850
- Preceded by: Gabriel Adams
- Succeeded by: Joseph Barker

Personal details
- Party: Whig

Military service
- Allegiance: United States
- Battles/wars: Mexican–American War (Siege of Veracruz)

John Herron, served as Mayor of Pittsburgh from 1849 to 1850. He was a Whig. He was the son of Dr. Francis Herron, the well-known Presbyterian Minister. The Herrons were among the founding families of Pittsburgh. He captained the Duquesne Grays in the Mexican-American War during the Siege of Veracruz. His war feats greatly enhanced his electability and President Zachary Taylor visited the city during Mayor Herron's term.

== See also ==
- List of mayors of Pittsburgh

Preceded by Gabriel Adams	Mayor of Pittsburgh; 1849–1850	Succeeded by Joseph Barker
