= C.D. Scully =

Fireboat

The C.D. Scully was a fireboat constructed for Pittsburgh, Pennsylvania. The vessel was owned by Pittsburgh from its completion, in 1956, until its sale to Tampa, Florida, in 1973. She had been out of service for some time, when she was sold. She cost $91,500, in 1956, and was sold for $50,000.

In March 1951 an editorial in Fire Engineering described a serious fire on Pittsburgh's waterfront, in December 1950, that the City couldn't properly fight, because they then had no fireboat. The editor argued that too much of the extensive expenditures in civil defense were being concentrated too much on bomb shelters, with insufficient funding for fire-fighting equipment.

The Pittsburgh Post-Gazette quoted Fire Chief Thomas Kennelly, who said the city did not need a fireboat. "We don't have any wharves or piers and any fire we have can be handled by our land fire fighting force."

She was 62 feet (19 m) long.

In 2015 and 2016 Pittsburgh experienced fires that put a focus on its need to acquire a new fireboat, and in December 2016 a new boat was ordered.
