= Jared M. Brush =

American politician

Jared Martin Brush
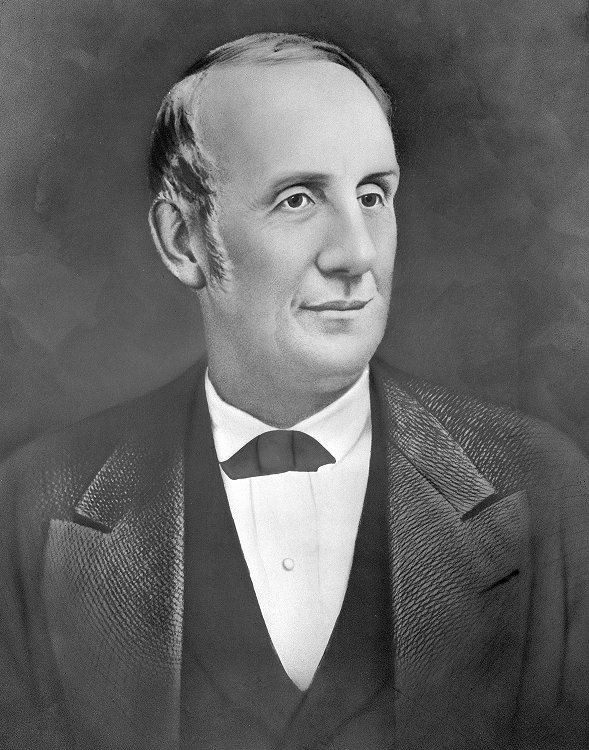
- Portrait of Jared M. Brush, c. 1869–1872

28th Mayor of Pittsburgh
- In office 1869–1872
- Preceded by: James Blackmore
- Succeeded by: James Blackmore

Personal details
- Born: October 10, 1814
- Died: November 3, 1895 (aged 81)

Jared M. Brush (October 10, 1814 – November 3, 1895) was Mayor of Pittsburgh from 1869 to 1872.

== Life ==
Jared Brush was born on October 10, 1814, at the corner of Third Street and Cherry Way. He became a carpenter, and later a contractor. He married Sarah Dithridge, and they had nine children of whom only two lived to adulthood.

Brush was Overseer of the Poor of Pitt Township from 1842 to 1845; then a deputy sheriff; and became Clerk of the Courts of Allegheny County in 1851. In 1854, Brush got into the business of ironmaking and was elected a city councilman.

During the American Civil War, Brush worked with the United States Sanitary Commission, a relief agency that ministered to the soldiers.

He was Mayor of Pittsburgh from 1869 to 1872. Brush's administration was praised because of his extensive street construction projects and the establishment of the first full-time Fire Department.

After his term ended, Brush served successively as a school director, superintendent of the city poor farm and clerk in the assessor's office and that of the treasurer. He was appointed as a police magistrate in 1888. Brush also served as director of several Pittsburgh banks.

He died on November 3, 1895, of pneumonia; and was buried in the Brush Family Mausoleum in Allegheny Cemetery.

Brushton, Pennsylvania, was named in his honor.

== See also ==
- List of mayors of Pittsburgh

== Sources ==
- Jared M. Brush at Political Graveyard

Political offices
Preceded by James Blackmore	Mayor of Pittsburgh; 1869–1872	Succeeded by James Blackmore
