= Sophie Masloff (fireboat) =

Sophie Masloff is a fireboat in Pittsburgh, Pennsylvania. On December 16, 2016, Pittsburgh officials announced that half a million dollars had been budgeted to acquire a fireboat that was eventually named in honor of Pittsburgh's first female mayor. The new vessel, the city's first fireboat since 1973, was built by Lake Assault Boats, a Wisconsin firm for $542,750.

Two fires, a boat fire in 2015, and fire on a bridge undergoing maintenance, in 2016, convinced officials of the need for a fireboat. In May 2016 local media reported that the new vessel had been provisionally budgeted at $400,000, but one year in, operational costs raised concern. In 1973 the city sold its previous fireboat, named after former mayor Cornelius D. Scully, to Tampa, Florida, for $50,000.

The vessel was to be equipped with "sonar, forward-looking infrared cameras, and a state-of-the-art electronic suite". She will be 30 feet (9.1 m) long and able to pump a modest 3,000 gallons per minute and would be staffed by the crew of one of the city's regular fire-trucks, not by its own full-time crew. The vessel was delivered in August 2017.
