= Barbara Jean Burns (academic) =

- Born: 9 November 1941; Washington, D.C.
- Died: 28 January 2024 (aged 82); Chapel Hill, North Carolina
- Education: Jackson-Reed High School; University of Kentucky; Columbia University; Boston College
- Occupation: Academic

Barbara Jean Burns (9 November 1941 – 28 January 2024) was an American academic, psychiatrist, mental health services researcher, and educator.

== Biography ==
Burns received her bachelor's degree from the University of Kentucky, her master's degree from Columbia University, and her Ph.D. from Boston College. Burns created the first federal initiatives in children's mental health services research at the National institute of Mental Health in the late 1980s.

Burns held various positions at Boston College, Harvard University, Hood College, the University of Maryland, and Johns Hopkins University before moving to Duke. Burns worked for 31 years at the Psychiatry & Behavioral Sciences Department at Duke University until her retirement in June 2020. At Duke, she was co-director of the psychiatric, epidemiology, and health services research program from 1989 to 1997. Throughout her career, Barbara gained experience through a part-time private practice in her early career. On the side of teaching she was an experienced writer and researcher, co-authoring more than 300 publications such as cite Surgeon General's Report on Mental Health, and played a key role in evaluating SAMHSA-supported systems of care, according to Duke'S Today's website.

Besides her academic work as a psychologist and teacher, she was interested in nature and landscape. Burns died on January 28, 2024, after living at the Carol Woods Retirement Community for three years.
