= Thomas J. Murphy Jr. =

American politician

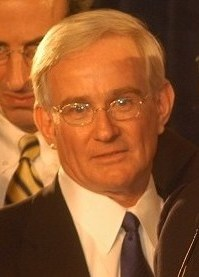

57th Mayor of Pittsburgh
- In office January 3, 1994 – January 3, 2006
- Preceded by: Sophie Masloff
- Succeeded by: Bob O'Connor

Member of the Pennsylvania House of Representatives from the 20th district
- In office January 4, 1983 – December 15, 1993
- Preceded by: Stephen Grabowski
- Succeeded by: Barbara Burns

Member of the Pennsylvania House of Representatives from the 17th district
- In office January 2, 1979 – November 30, 1982
- Preceded by: Robert Ravenstahl
- Succeeded by: Bob Robbins

Personal details
- Born: August 15, 1944 (age 81) Pittsburgh, Pennsylvania, U.S.
- Party: Democratic

Thomas J. Murphy Jr. (born August 15, 1944) is an American former politician and city management consultant from Pittsburgh, Pennsylvania. He served in state government in two capacities, from 1979 to 1982 representing the 17th district, and from 1983 to 1993 representing the 20th district. From January 1994 until January 2006 he served as mayor of Pittsburgh. Murphy is also a former senior resident fellow for urban development at the Urban Land Institute. Murphy is now a principal with Urban Development Advisors LLC, providing expert advice to communities to help them understand what drives real estate investment, sustainable land use practices, economic development and ensures long-lasting community commitment.

== Early life ==
The son of a steel worker, his education includes graduation from John Carroll University in Cleveland in 1967 and receiving a graduate degree from Hunter College in urban studies in 1973. From 1970 to 1972, Murphy and his wife, Mona, were in the Peace Corps in rural Paraguay, constructing sanitation facilities and an elementary school. After the Peace Corps, the Murphys returned to Pittsburgh and he became a neighborhood organizer for the North Side before entering local politics.

== Early political career ==
Murphy served as a state representative from the 17th district from January 2, 1979, until November 30, 1982. He also served in the same capacity representing Pittsburgh's North Side 20th Legislative District from January 4, 1983, to December 15, 1993.

In 1989 he was an unsuccessful candidate for the Democratic primary nomination for mayor of Pittsburgh, losing to Sophie Masloff (who ran unopposed in the November general election later that year).

In 1991 he and two other state legislators spearheaded reforms at the regional Pittsburgh industrial corporation, stressing that the agency needed more minority and female representation in its leadership, that the agency was not focusing on urban redevelopment so much as suburban properties, and that it was awarding grants to financial institutions instead of for industrial concerns.

== As mayor ==
Murphy was elected the mayor of Pittsburgh in November 1993 and was sworn in in January 1994. He used his educational background in urban management and administration, to function more like a city manager than a politician. He initiated a public-partnership strategy that leveraged approximately $4.5 billion in economic development in Pittsburgh. Against public opposition, he secured $1 billion (along with Allegheny County Commissioners Bob Cranmer and Mike Dawida) in funding for the development of Heinz Field, PNC Park, and a new David L. Lawrence Convention Center that in 2003 would become the largest certified "green" building in the United States.

The combined leadership of Commissioners Cranmer and Dawida with Mayor Murphy led to a building boom in Pittsburgh dubbed "Renaissance III" that was a catalyst for how the city would be viewed a decade later, when it was selected to host the 2009 G-20 summit, led by President Barack Obama. The Pittsburgh Post-Gazette commented in 1998 that "Allegheny County Commissioners Bob Cranmer and Mike Dawida understand the importance of a strong urban core and, through their partnership, have helped the mayor find ways to do what lesser leadership would considerable unthinkable... It is a meeting of such focused minds and willing spirits that stands to take Pittsburgh into a new era. Call it Renaissance III or call it just a better place to live, this is the blueprint of a renewable city that more people will be proud to call home."

As mayor, he oversaw the transformation of more than 1,000 acres (4 km^{2}) of blighted, abandoned industrial land into new commercial, residential, retail, and public uses. He also lured, using public subsidies, both Lazarus and Lord & Taylor department stores to the city's downtown core. Both stores eventually failed, however, each closing within a decade. The idea of big box retail along the city's downtown core of Fifth and Forbes Avenue actually goes back two administrations to the Caliguri mayoralship in 1987.

Murphy also led the development of more than 25 miles of new riverfront trails and urban green space. "Big idea" initiatives such as these, combined with the commonwealth-imposed century-old restrictions on annexing any suburbs or consolidating with the county for a "regional" or "metropolitan" tax base to equitably spread costs to commuters and urban dwellers alike and drove the city to the brink of bankruptcy. Several initiatives to modernize the state-controlled regional tax and government structure to reflect the rapid growth of nonprofit universities, hospitals, churches, and parks within the city limits with the rapid population migration out of the city to formerly rural suburbs and counties all failed to be approved by the state.

The city eventually was declared financially "distressed" by the state after blocking all annexations, county-consolidations, nonprofit hospital or university tax levees, and commuter or suburban tax balances. To help recoup some of the city's losses during this period and to highlight the state's refusal to allow the city to grow geographically as the region's population had, with annexing or consolidating modern suburbs, Murphy was forced into the controversial 2003 decision to lay off a number of city employees, including Pittsburgh Police officers. Some of these jobs were later saved by dramatically increasing the city's parking tax as one of the few "commuter"-"suburban" taxes within the city's power to levy without state power to block, making it the largest such tax in the country. While at the time, the parking tax was met with ridicule and contempt, it has presently been analyzed as one of the key factors in rejuvenating the downtown core, while encouraging the growth of rapid transit, bike lanes and trails, and "green alternatives", and while providing a fiscal foundation for the city for decades to come. In light of the comparable city of Detroit's devolution into bankruptcy, Murphy's parking tax and its effects on both the fiscal health and downtown vitality in business and mass transit has become a case study in effective core city management.

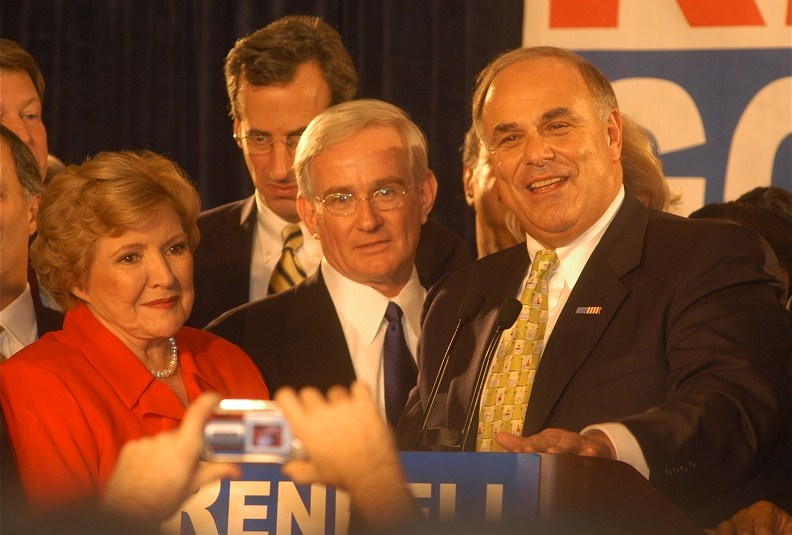
Lt. Governor Catherine Knoll, Tom Murphy (center), and Governor Ed Rendell at a political event

Murphy's dealings with the city firefighters union also has been questioned. Prior to the 2001 mayoral election, Murphy allegedly signed the firefighters to a new contract worth $10–12 million with a no-layoff clause in exchange for their vote. He would go on to narrowly defeat then City Council President Bob O'Connor (who later would become mayor).

In 2004, Murphy announced that he would not run for re-election. In June 2006, Murphy entered into an agreement with federal government to avoid prosecution from his involvement with the firefighters union.

While being considered a man with big ideas, Murphy's political skills were questioned later in his tenure as some of his policies slowly wore out relationships with the Pittsburgh City Council and the increasingly Republican and rural-focused commonwealth legislature. Impatience in working with the opposition-held Pennsylvania General Assembly late in his career, harmed the city's image in some state political circles.

Praised as a visionary, but not as a politician, his tough choices after the city's budget crisis in 2003 resulted in a citizen group unsuccessfully proposing his impeachment.

In 1999, Murphy served on the selection committee for the Rudy Bruner Award for Urban Excellence.

Murphy was one of Pennsylvania's presidential electors in 2000, casting his vote in favor of Al Gore.

=== Murphy's mayoral election history ===
- 1993 race results
  - Tom Murphy (D), 66%
  - Kathy Matta (R), 14%
- 1997 race results
  - Tom Murphy (D), 77%
  - Harry Frost (R), 21%
- 2001 race results
  - Tom Murphy (D), 74%
  - James Carmine (R), 23%

== Post-political life ==
Since leaving City Hall, Murphy and his wife continue to live in their self-restored, 150-year-old farmhouse in North Side of Pittsburgh, where they raised their two daughters, Shannon and Molly, and their son, T.J. He has one grandson, Wyatt Murphy.

From 2006 to 2023 Murphy served as the Senior Resident Fellow for Urban Development at the Urban Land Institute (ULI). He participated and chaired more that 60 Advisory Services panels in locations as diverse as Singapore, Ireland, Germany, China, the Philippines and more than 50 cities and communities around the United States. Murphy is now a principal with Urban Development Advisors LLC, providing expert advice to communities to help them understand what drives real estate investment, sustainable land use practices, economic development and ensures long-lasting community commitment.

== See also ==
- List of mayors of Pittsburgh

Political offices
Preceded by Sophie Masloff	Mayor of Pittsburgh; 1994–2006	Succeeded by Bob O'Connor
Pennsylvania House of Representatives
Preceded by Stephen Grabowski	Member of the Pennsylvania House of Representatives for the 20th District; 1983–1993	Succeeded by Barbara Burns
Preceded by Robert Ravenstahl	Member of the Pennsylvania House of Representatives for the 17th District; 1979–1982	Succeeded by Bob Robbins
