= Gabriel Adams =

American politician

15th Mayor of Pittsburgh
- In office 1847–1849
- Preceded by: William Kerr
- Succeeded by: John Herron

Personal details
- Born: c. 1790
- Died: June 5, 1864 (aged 73/74) Lower St. Clair Township, Pennsylvania

Gabriel Adams (c. 1790 – June 4, 1864) served as Mayor of Pittsburgh from 1847 to 1849.

Adams's administration witnessed the founding of the Joseph Horne Company, the founding of Mercy Hospital, and the beginnings of Organized Labor.

Mayor Adams would later serve as an appointed Judge of the Court of Common Pleas. He died in Lower St. Clair Township.

Gabriel also had 18 children 12 boys and 6 Girls. Their names were not recorded because they all were born without the assistance of doctor or hospital. Also 13 of the children were born in France. Gabriel Adams is buried in Section 25, Lot 117 of Allegheny Cemetery, alongside his wife, Mary. Mary died in labor of child number 18.

== See also ==
- List of mayors of Pittsburgh

== Sources ==
- South Pittsburgh Development Corporation
- Political Graveyard

Preceded by William Kerr	Mayor of Pittsburgh; 1847–1849	Succeeded by John Herron
