= List of mayors of Pittsburgh =

Mayor of Pittsburgh
- City of Pittsburgh coat of arms

- Flag of the mayor of Pittsburgh

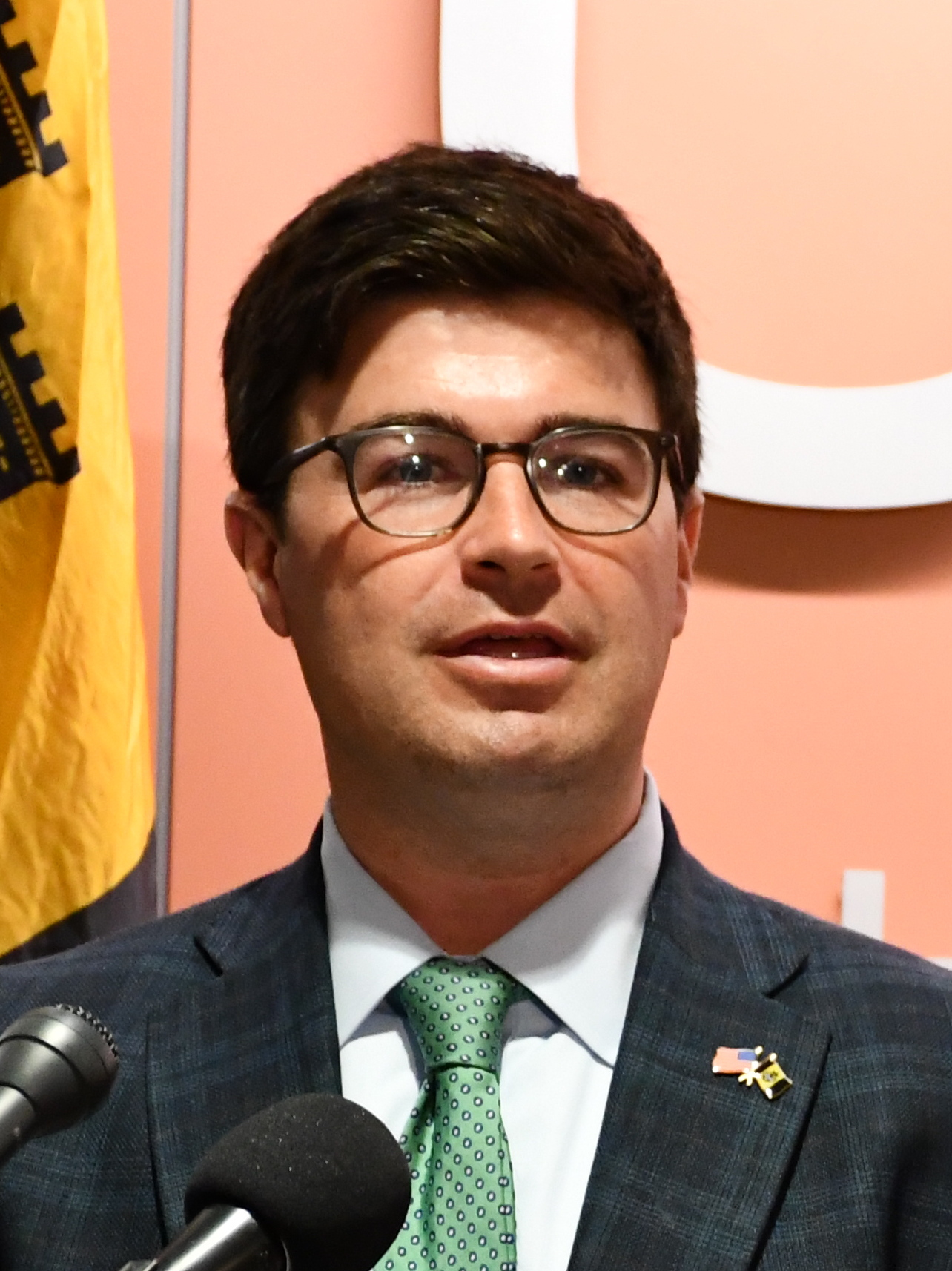
- Incumbent; Corey O'Connor since January 5, 2026
- Style: "The Honorable"
- Term length: 4 years, no term limits
- Inaugural holder: Ebenezer Denny
- Formation: 1816
- Salary: $145,018 (2026)
- Website: Office of the Mayor

The mayor of Pittsburgh is the chief executive of the government of the city of Pittsburgh, Pennsylvania, United States, as stipulated by the Charter of the City of Pittsburgh.

Prior to the 1816 city charter, the Borough of Pittsburgh had its council elect a chief burgess among themselves. After the borough was rechartered as a city, its first seven mayors were selected in a similar fashion as the chief burgesses had been under borough council. It was not until Mayor Samuel Pettigrew in the 1830s that general elections of popular vote were conducted among all the city's voters to determine who would hold the mayor's office. Pettigrew was both the last mayor selected by council and the first generally elected mayor of Pittsburgh. From 1901 to 1903 the state legislature took control of the city on the grounds of corruption by former Mayor William J. Diehl with the passage of the so-called "ripper bill" and appointed the unelected "recorders" Joseph Brown and Adam Brown, who were answerable only to the state government. Since 1903, all mayors have been popularly elected. As of 2026, the current mayor is Corey O'Connor.

== Chief burgesses (1794–1813) ==
No.	Chief Burgess	Term	Party	Notes
1	George Robinson	1794–c. 1800		Arrested on orders from President George Washington for rebel activity during the Whiskey Rebellion.
2	John Park	1800–1801		
3	Dr. George Stevenson	1801–1802		
4	Isaac Craig	1802–1803	Federalist	
5	James O'Hara	1803–1804	Federalist	Formerly 6th Quartermaster General of the United States Army and Revolutionary War veteran.
6	General Pressley Neville	1804–1805		Revolutionary War veteran.
7	General John Wilkins	c. 1805–c. 1812		Formerly 7th and last Quartermaster General of the U.S. Army
8	William Steele	1812–1813		

== Mayors (since 1816) ==
No.	Mayor	Term	Party	Notes	Opposition
1	Ebenezer Denny #	1816–1817	Federalist	First "appointed" mayor after city charter, resigned from office with health concerns, Revolutionary War veteran.	
2	John Darragh	1817–1825	Federalist	Appointed by City Council, formerly president of the bank of Pittsburgh.	
3	John M. Snowden	1825–1828	Democratic-Republican, Jacksonian	Appointed by City Council, formerly president of the bank of Pittsburgh and county treasurer, edited the Pittsburgh Mercury.	
4	Magnus Miller Murray	1828–1830	Jacksonian, Democrat	Appointed by City Council	
5	Matthew B. Lowrie	1830–1831	Anti-Masonic	Appointed by City Council, brother was a U.S. Senator and son became Chief Justice of the Pennsylvania Supreme Court.	
6	Magnus Miller Murray	1831–1832	Democrat	Appointed by City Council	
7	Samuel Pettigrew	1832–1836	Democrat	Appointed by City Council, later won the first mayoral election	
7	Samuel Pettigrew	1832–1836	Jackson and Clay (1834–35)	Appointed by City Council, later won the first mayoral election	
7	Samuel Pettigrew	1832–1836	Democratic and Workingmen's (1835–36)	Appointed by City Council, later won the first mayoral election	
8	Dr. Jonas R. McClintock	1836–1839	Democrat (1836–37)	Elected mayor at the age of 28, became the first man to assume the office from a general election. Later led a Union company in the American Civil War.	
8	Dr. Jonas R. McClintock	1836–1839	City (1837–38)	Elected mayor at the age of 28, became the first man to assume the office from a general election. Later led a Union company in the American Civil War.	
8	Dr. Jonas R. McClintock	1836–1839	City Improvement (1838–39)	Elected mayor at the age of 28, became the first man to assume the office from a general election. Later led a Union company in the American Civil War.	
9	William Little	1839–1840	Independent (Note: Nominated by the firemen of Pittsburgh.)		
10	William W. Irwin	1840–1841	Whig (and Anti-Masonic) (Note: Mayors labeled as "Whig" on this list were also called "Whig and Anti-Masonic," to a lessening degree over the years.)	Elected to congress and appointed United States Ambassador to Denmark after leaving office.	
11	James Thomson	1841–1842	Whig		
12	Alexander Hay	1842–1845	Whig (1842–43)	After office he was commander in the Mexican War, and captain in the Civil War.	
12	Alexander Hay	1842–1845	Volunteer (1843–44)	After office he was commander in the Mexican War, and captain in the Civil War.	
12	Alexander Hay	1842–1845	Independent/Volunteer (1844–45)	After office he was commander in the Mexican War, and captain in the Civil War.	
13	William J. Howard	1845–1846	Whig	Longtime president of the "Guardians of the Poor", forerunner of the Salvation Army	
14	William Kerr	1846–1847	Democrat		
15	Gabriel Adams	1847–1849	Whig	After office was appointed state judge	
16	John Herron	1849–1850	Whig	Before office was a captain in the Mexican War, hero of the Siege of Veracruz.	
17	Joseph Barker	1850–1851	People's and Anti-Catholic	Elected while in jail for inciting anti-Catholic and anti-Masonic riots. The itinerant preacher was released to serve his one-year mayoral term. Barker repeatedly sought re-election, but failed. Later, he was decapitated when he got too close to a train.	
18	John B. Guthrie	1851–1853	Democrat	Father of future mayor George W. Guthrie, served in Mexican War, was the longtime Customs Collector for Pittsburgh	
19	Robert M. Riddle	1853–1854	Whig	Formerly Postmaster of Pittsburgh, edited the Commercial Journal	
20	Ferdinand E. Volz	1854–1856	Whig (1854–55)	Oversaw cholera epidemic response	
20	Ferdinand E. Volz	1854–1856	Whig-Democratic fusion (anti-Know Nothing) (1855–56)	Oversaw cholera epidemic response	
21	William Bingham	1856–1857	American		
22	Henry A. Weaver	1857–1860	Republican	After office served as U.S. Collector of Revenue for Pittsburgh	
23	George Wilson	1860–1862	Republican	Formerly Pittsburgh Public Schools Director	
24	Benair C. Sawyer	1862–1864	Republican	After office moved to Colorado then to California making a fortune in mining	
25	James Lowry, Jr.	1864–1866	Union City		
26	William C. McCarthy	1866–1868	Republican	Formerly a legend as a City fire fighter and commander, during administration ended the police practice of assuring "All is Well" on the hour, later served as city controller.	
27	James Blackmore	1868–1869	Workingmen's	Formerly Chief Clerk of City	
28	Jared M. Brush	1869–1872	Republican	Formerly city councilor, served as a minister during the Civil War.	
29	James Blackmore	1872–1875	Democrat	Formerly Chief Clerk of City	
30	William C. McCarthy	1875–1878	Republican	Formerly a legend as a Pittsburgh Fire Fighter and commander, during administration ended the police practice of assuring "All is Well" on the hour, later served as city controller.	
31	Robert Liddell	1878–1881	Democrat	Before and after office was a brewer and liquor dealer.	Miles S. Humphreys
32	Robert W. Lyon	1881–1884	Democrat	Earned two Purple Hearts in the Civil War, oil businessman before being elected, worked in a steel mill after leaving office.	Miles S. Humphreys
33	Andrew Fulton	1884–1887	Republican	Former city councilman; temporarily retired to breed horses in Colorado; later served as county director of the Division of Weights and Measures	Robert Liddell
34	William McCallin	1887–1890	Republican	Former County Coroner and County Sheriff	Bernard J. McKenna
35	Henry I. Gourley	1890–1893	Republican	Former city councilman; became city clerk after office	John H. Bailey
36	Bernard J. McKenna	1893–1896	Democrat	Former city councilman and firefighter	John S. Lambie & F.C. Beinhauer
37	Henry P. Ford	1896–1899	Republican	Industrialist, with interests in knife manufacturing.	George W. Guthrie
38	William J. Diehl #	1899–1901	Republican	Former Deputy Sheriff; impeached on corruption charges	John C. O'Donnell
39	Adam M. Brown	1901	Republican	Former Court of Common Pleas judge; California Gold Rush speculator; earned the nickname of "Major" due to his military service	non-elected
40	Joseph O. Brown †	1901–1903	Republican	Former Allegheny County Prothonotary and city Director of Public Safety; died in office of a heart attack	non-elected
41	William B. Hays	1903–1906	Citizens / Democrat	Industrialist, with interests in coal and lumber	John C. Haymaker
42	George W. Guthrie	1906–1909	Democrat	Attorney; son of former mayor John B. Guthrie; served as United States Ambassador to Japan after office.	Alexander M. Jenkinson
43	William A. Magee	1909–1914	Republican	Former Allegheny County Assistant District Attorney and city councilman	
44	Joseph G. Armstrong	1914–1918	Republican (Note: Did not officially run as a Republican, as a non-partisan ballot law was in force.)	Former city councilman and Allegheny County Coroner; nicknamed "Joe the Builder" for his extensive public works projects	Stephen G. Porter
45	Edward V. Babcock	1918–1922	Republican	Former city councilman; later served as Allegheny County Commissioner; personally purchased 4,000 acres (16 km^{2}) for county parklands. Purchased thousands of acres of south Florida timberland, estate sold to the state for conservation in the 1990s.	William A. Magee
46	William A. Magee	1922–1926	Republican	Former City Council President	William N. McNair
47	Charles H. Kline #	1926–1933	Republican	Former State Representative and State Senator; convicted in 1932 by jury on 49 counts of corruption, but charges later overturned on appeal; resigned due to party pressure over corruption charges	James F Malone, Tom Dunn
48	John S. Herron	1933–1934	Republican	Former City Council President	non-elected
49	William N. McNair #	1934–1936	Democrat	Idealistic attorney; commended for his honesty, but criticized for his inability to get along with city council or the bureaucracy; arrested in 1935 for failing to authorize the return of a fine to an illegal gambler whose conviction had been overturned; resigned due to political infighting	John Herron
50	Cornelius D. Scully	1936–1946	Democrat	Former City Council President	Bob Waddell
50	Cornelius D. Scully	1936–1946	Democrat	Former City Council President	Harmar Denny
51	David L. Lawrence #	1946–1959	Democrat	Named one of the all-time 50 greatest American mayors; elected governor in 1958; former Pennsylvania Democratic Party Chairman, Secretary of the Commonwealth, and U.S. Collector of Revenue; considered a "king maker" by Democratic Party Conventions due to his crafting of compromise candidates of U.S. Presidents Truman and the Kennedy/Johnson tickets.	Bob Waddell
51	David L. Lawrence #	1946–1959	Democrat	Named one of the all-time 50 greatest American mayors; elected governor in 1958; former Pennsylvania Democratic Party Chairman, Secretary of the Commonwealth, and U.S. Collector of Revenue; considered a "king maker" by Democratic Party Conventions due to his crafting of compromise candidates of U.S. Presidents Truman and the Kennedy/Johnson tickets.	Tice Ryan
51	David L. Lawrence #	1946–1959	Democrat	Named one of the all-time 50 greatest American mayors; elected governor in 1958; former Pennsylvania Democratic Party Chairman, Secretary of the Commonwealth, and U.S. Collector of Revenue; considered a "king maker" by Democratic Party Conventions due to his crafting of compromise candidates of U.S. Presidents Truman and the Kennedy/Johnson tickets.	Leo Kane
51	David L. Lawrence #	1946–1959	Democrat	Named one of the all-time 50 greatest American mayors; elected governor in 1958; former Pennsylvania Democratic Party Chairman, Secretary of the Commonwealth, and U.S. Collector of Revenue; considered a "king maker" by Democratic Party Conventions due to his crafting of compromise candidates of U.S. Presidents Truman and the Kennedy/Johnson tickets.	John Drew
52	Thomas Gallagher	1959	Democrat	Former State Representative and City Council President; became mayor at age 75	non-elected
53	Joseph M. Barr	1959–1970	Democrat	Former State Senator	Will Crehan
53	Joseph M. Barr	1959–1970	Democrat	Former State Senator	Vince Rovitto
54	Peter F. Flaherty #	1970–1977	Democrat	Former city councilman; resigned after he was appointed Deputy U.S. Attorney General by President Carter; Democratic nominee for governor in 1978, and for U.S. Senate in 1974 and 1980, losing all three races by close margins	John K. Tabor
54	Peter F. Flaherty #	1970–1977	"Fusion" Democrat (Note: Nominated by both major parties.)	Former city councilman; resigned after he was appointed Deputy U.S. Attorney General by President Carter; Democratic nominee for governor in 1978, and for U.S. Senate in 1974 and 1980, losing all three races by close margins	Unopposed
55	Richard Caliguiri †	1977–1988	Independent Democrat	Former City Council President; won 1978 election as an independent, after initially deciding not to run due to a lack of support from party leaders; died in office from amyloidosis	Tom Foerster & Vince Cosetti
55	Richard Caliguiri †	1977–1988	Democrat	Former City Council President; won 1978 election as an independent, after initially deciding not to run due to a lack of support from party leaders; died in office from amyloidosis	Fred Goehringer
55	Richard Caliguiri †	1977–1988	Democrat	Former City Council President; won 1978 election as an independent, after initially deciding not to run due to a lack of support from party leaders; died in office from amyloidosis	Henry Sneath
56	Sophie Masloff	1988–1994	Democrat	Former City Council President; began her career in Pittsburgh politics as a Court secretary in 1938 at age 18	Uncontested
57	Thomas J. Murphy, Jr. ♥	1994–2006	Democrat	Former State Representative; lectures internationally on cities as a senior fellow at Washington, DC–based Urban Land Institute	Duane Darkins & Kathy Matta
57	Thomas J. Murphy, Jr. ♥	1994–2006	Democrat	Former State Representative; lectures internationally on cities as a senior fellow at Washington, DC–based Urban Land Institute	Harry Frost
57	Thomas J. Murphy, Jr. ♥	1994–2006	Democrat	Former State Representative; lectures internationally on cities as a senior fellow at Washington, DC–based Urban Land Institute	James Carmine
58	Bob O'Connor †	2006	Democrat	Former City Council President; died in office from a brain tumor.	Joe Weinroth & Titus North
59	Luke Ravenstahl ♥	2006–2014	Democrat	Former City Council President; became mayor at age 26, making him the youngest mayor of a top 100 city.	Mark DeSantis
59	Luke Ravenstahl ♥	2006–2014	Democrat	Former City Council President; became mayor at age 26, making him the youngest mayor of a top 100 city.	Dok Harris & Kevin Acklin
60	Bill Peduto ♥	2014–2022	Democrat	Former city councilman	Joshua Wander
60	Bill Peduto ♥	2014–2022	Democrat	Former city councilman	Unopposed
61	Ed Gainey ♥	2022–2026	Democrat	Former state representative; became the first African-American mayor of the city	Tony Moreno
62	Corey O'Connor ♥	2026–Present	Democrat	Former controller of Allegheny County and city councilman	Tony Moreno

† Died in office; # Resigned from office ; ♥ Still living

== Longest tenures ==
- 13 years (1946–1959) – David L. Lawrence
- 12 years (1994–2006) – Thomas J. Murphy, Jr.
- 11 years and 1 month (1977–1988) – Richard Caliguiri
- 10 years and 1 month (1959–1970) – Joseph M. Barr
- 9 years and 3 months (1936–1946) – Cornelius D. Scully
- 8 years and 9 months (1909–1914, 1922–1926) – William A. Magee
- 8 years (2014–2022) – Bill Peduto
- 7 years and 11 months (1817–1825) – John Darragh
- 7 years and 4 months (2006–2014) – Luke Ravenstahl
- 7 years and >3 months (1970–1977) – Peter F. Flaherty
- 7 years and <3 months (1926–1933) – Charles H. Kline

The listed terms are rounded to the nearest month.

== See also ==
- History of Pittsburgh
- List of mayors of Allegheny, Pennsylvania
- Pittsburgh City Council
- Pittsburgh Mayoral Chief of Staff

== Sources ==
- Holli, Melvin G.; Jones, Peter d'A., eds. (1981). Biographical Dictionary of American Mayors, 1820-1980. Westport, CT: Greenwood Press. ISBN 0-313-21134-5.
- Office of Prothonotary; Allegheny County, Pennsylvania
- Historic Pittsburgh Collection
- Political Graveyard: Pittsburgh
