= Sophie Masloff =

American mayor (1917–2014)

56th Mayor of Pittsburgh
- In office May 6, 1988 – January 3, 1994
- Preceded by: Richard Caliguiri
- Succeeded by: Tom Murphy

President of the Pittsburgh City Council
- In office January 4, 1988 – May 6, 1988
- Preceded by: Ben Woods
- Succeeded by: Ben Woods (Acting)^{[a]}

Member of the Pittsburgh City Council
- In office April 27, 1976 – May 6, 1988
- Preceded by: Amy Ballinger
- Succeeded by: Duane Darkins

Personal details
- Born: Sophie Friedman; December 23, 1917 Pittsburgh, Pennsylvania, U.S.
- Died: August 17, 2014 (aged 96) Mt. Lebanon, Pennsylvania, U.S.
- Party: Democratic
- Spouse(s): Jack Masloff m. 1939–1991 (his death)
- Children: 1
- a.As the Council's President Pro Tempore, Woods declared himself Acting Council President following Masloff's ascension to the office of Mayor.

Sophie Masloff (née Friedman; December 23, 1917 – August 17, 2014) was an American politician. A long-time member of the Democratic Party and civil servant, she was elected to the Pittsburgh City Council and later served as the mayor of Pittsburgh from 1988 to 1994. She was the first and to date only woman and the first Jew to hold that office.

== Early life ==
Masloff was born Sophie Friedman on December 23, 1917 to Romanian Jewish parents Jennie and Louis Friedman in the Hill District of Pittsburgh, Pennsylvania. Her father, an insurance salesman, died when she was two years old. She had two sisters and a brother from her mother's previous marriage. She spoke only Yiddish until she began attending elementary school. She graduated from Fifth Avenue High School in 1935, and began a job as clerk in the Allegheny County Court of Common Pleas in 1938, where she stayed for 38 years.

== Political career ==
=== City council ===
Masloff was elected to the Pittsburgh City Council in 1976. As one of two females on council in the 1970s she was often witness to Councilwoman Michelle Madoff's colorful arguments. After a years long fight by Madoff to have the one restroom that was available to City Council at the Pittsburgh City Hall redesigned to be used in a uni-sex fashion Masloff was invited to a "toilet party" by Madoff to celebrate her success. Masloff did not attend, later commenting to the press: "What the hell do I care about her toilet? I got more important things to do."

In January 1988, Masloff was elected president of the city council. Just four months later, mayor Richard Caliguiri died in office on May 6, 1988. According to the city charter, the city council president stood first in the line of succession, so Masloff automatically became mayor.

=== Pittsburgh mayor ===
Masloff served out the remainder of Caliguiri's term, and was unopposed in a bid for a full term in November 1989. She was the first woman and the first Jew to hold the post. She once referred to the rock band The Who as "The How," among many other rehearsed malapropisms.

- Masloff's administration was forced to deal with problems such as urban decay, a shrinking industrial sector, and crumbling infrastructure.
- She was the first public figure to suggest that the city's baseball and football teams each have their own stadiums. Her vision was eventually implemented years after she left office. The success of retro-style ballparks such as Cleveland's Jacobs Field and Baltimore's Camden Yards eventually led to the building of PNC Park and of Heinz Field, a separate football stadium.
- Masloff made fiscal responsibility the centerpiece of her term in office. During her administration, she privatized numerous costly city assets including the Pittsburgh Zoo, the National Aviary, Phipps Conservatory, and the Schenley Park Golf Course. She and the city council were sued by city controller Tom Flaherty for cutting $506,000 from his 1992 budget.

== Electoral history ==
- 1989 Pittsburgh mayoral election
  - Sophie Masloff (D), 100% (ran uncontested)

== Retirement and other achievements ==
Masloff declined to run for a second full term in the 1993 election and retired to her home in Pittsburgh's Squirrel Hill neighborhood in 1994. After stepping down as mayor, she served as a Presidential Elector for Pennsylvania in 1996 and was a delegate to the Democratic National Convention from Pennsylvania in 2000 and 2004. She also appeared in advertisements for Bruegger's and Schneider's Dairy.

In 2007 a street near PNC Park was named Sophie Masloff Way in honor of Masloff at her 90th birthday. On September 13, 2011 Pennsylvania Governor Tom Corbett was on hand at the Pittsburgh Zoo as a seal was named for Masloff. Masloff died of natural causes on the morning of August 17, 2014, at the Center for Compassionate Care in Mt. Lebanon, Pennsylvania.

A new fireboat, acquired for Pittsburgh's fire department in 2017, was named in honor of Masloff.

Political offices
Preceded by Richard Caliguiri	Mayor of Pittsburgh; 1988–1994	Succeeded by Tom Murphy
Pittsburgh City Council
Preceded by Ben Woods	President of the Pittsburgh City Council; 1988	Succeeded by Ben Woods^{1} Acting
Preceded by Amy Ballinger	Member of the Pittsburgh City Council; 1976–1988	Succeeded by Duane Darkins
Notes and references
1. As the Council's President Pro Tempore, Woods declared himself Acting Council President following Masloff's ascension to the office of Mayor
