= Joseph M. Barr =

American politician

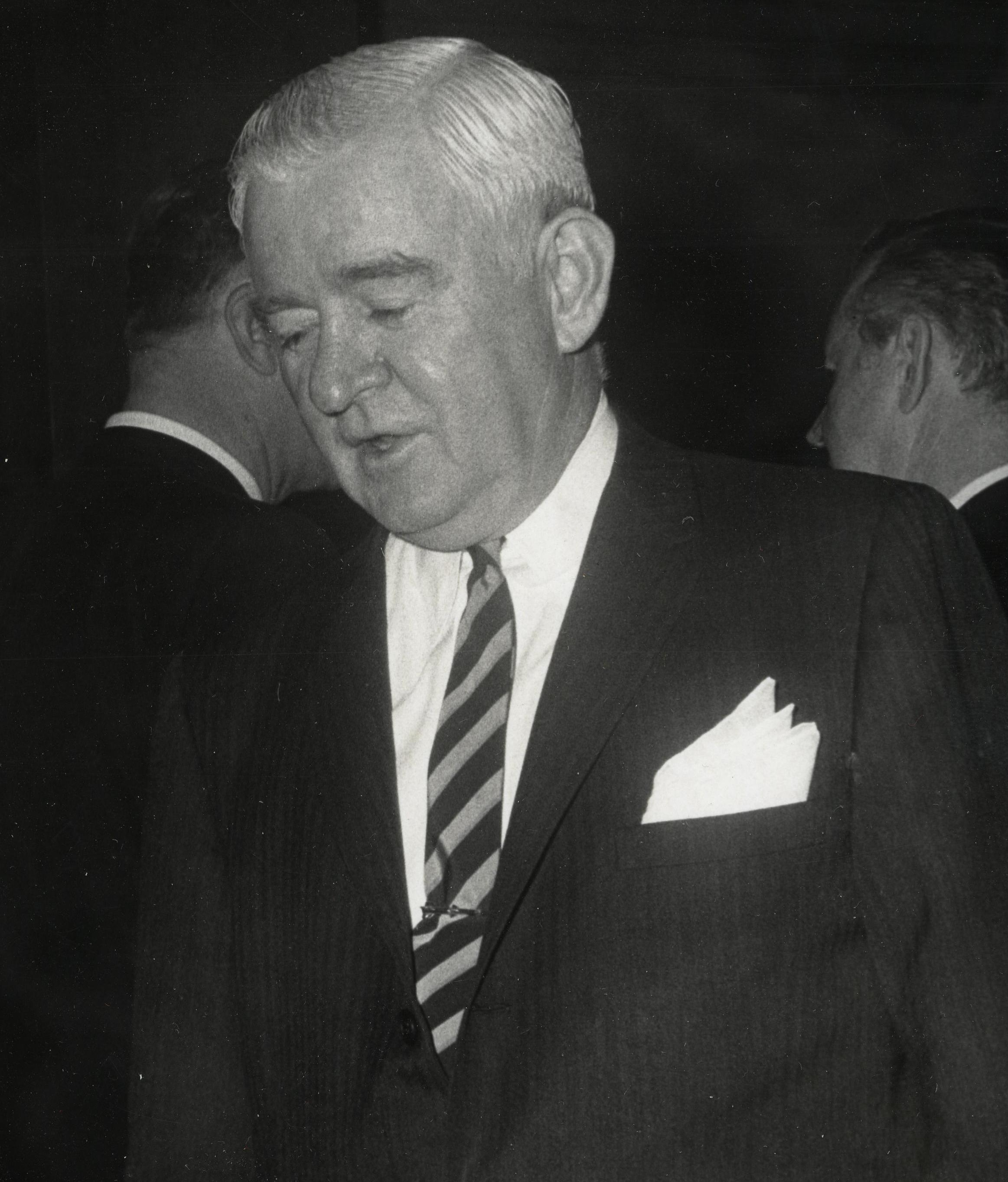
- Barr in 1961

53rd Mayor of Pittsburgh
- In office December 2, 1959 – January 5, 1970
- Preceded by: Thomas Gallagher
- Succeeded by: Pete Flaherty

25th President of the United States Conference of Mayors
- In office 1967–1968
- Preceded by: Jerome Cavanagh
- Succeeded by: Terry Schrunk

Member of the Democratic National Committee from Pennsylvania
- In office December 16, 1966 – May 25, 1972
- Preceded by: David Lawrence
- Succeeded by: Robert Jones

Chair of the Pennsylvania Democratic Party
- In office June 9, 1954 – July 23, 1959
- Preceded by: Maurice Splain, Jr.
- Succeeded by: John Rice

Member of the Pennsylvania Senate from the 43rd district
- In office January 7, 1941 – November 29, 1959
- Preceded by: Thomas Kilgallen
- Succeeded by: John Devlin

Personal details
- Born: May 28, 1906 Pittsburgh, Pennsylvania, U.S.
- Died: August 26, 1982 (aged 76) Pittsburgh, Pennsylvania, U.S.
- Party: Democratic
- Profession: Salesman

Joseph M. Barr (May 28, 1906 – August 26, 1982) was an American politician who held a variety of positions, including an eleven-year tenure as mayor of Pittsburgh from 1959 to 1970.

== Life ==
Barr was born in Pittsburgh to James P. and Blanche E. Moran Barr. He married Alice White, when she was 29 and he was 43. White had been active with women's Republican groups in Chicago but left the Republican party in support of her Democrat husband. Together they had two children, Alice ("Candy") and Joseph ("Skipp).

== Pittsburgh politics ==
In 1959 Barr, the consummate Harrisburg insider, and David L. Lawrence, the seasoned Pittsburgh mayor, swapped roles, with Barr coming "home" and running for mayor and Lawrence becoming Governor of Pennsylvania. Barr was instrumental as mayor in completing many of the Lawrence programs, while at the same time having the city's infrastructure catch up to all the progress that Lawrence instituted. Expanded and modernized street lights, water services, and the stadiums were all hallmarks of Barr's leadership. He oversaw the completion of Three Rivers Stadium and the Pittsburgh Civic Arena, both having bogged down in heated political disputes during Lawrence's tenure.

== State Democratic politics ==
In 1940, Barr became the state's youngest state senator, serving the Pittsburgh-area in Harrisburg. Barr was elected chair of the State Democratic Party in 1954, and was elected Pennsylvania's male representative on the Democratic National Committee following Lawrence's death in 1966. He retired from public life in 1972.

== Other work ==
In 1967 and 1968, Barr served as president of the United States Conference of Mayors.

== Later life ==
Barr died on August 26, 1982. He is buried in Pittsburgh's St. Mary Cemetery.

Political offices
Preceded by Thomas Gallagher	Mayor of Pittsburgh; 1959–1970	Succeeded by Pete Flaherty
Pennsylvania State Senate
Preceded by Thomas Kilgallen	Member of the Pennsylvania Senate for the 43rd District; 1941–1960	Succeeded by John Devlin
Party political offices
Preceded by David Lawrence	Member of the Democratic National Committee from Pennsylvania; 1966–1972	Succeeded by Robert Jones
Preceded by Maurice Splain, Jr.	Chairman of the Pennsylvania Democratic Party; 1954–1959	Succeeded by John Rice
