= 1921 Pittsburgh mayoral election =

- November 8, 1921
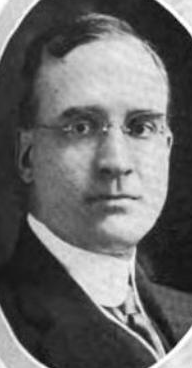

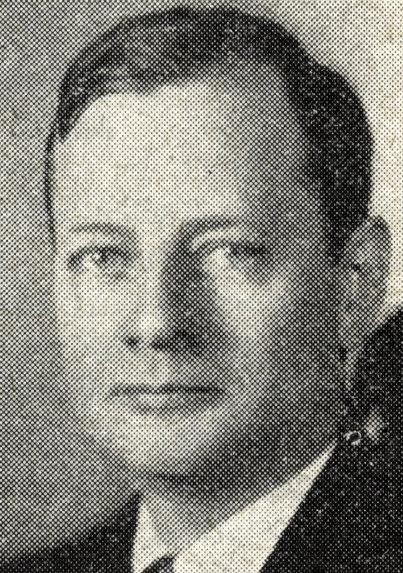
Nominee	William A. Magee	William N. McNair
Party	Republican	Democratic
Popular vote	77,367	34,492
Percentage	67.9%	30.3%
Mayor before election
Edward V. Babcock
Elected Mayor
William A. Magee
Republican

The 1921 Pittsburgh mayoral election was held on Tuesday, November 8, 1921. Republican nominee William A. Magee was elected by a large margin over Democratic candidate William N. McNair.

== Background ==
The 1921 election was the last election under a law that prohibited mayors of Pittsburgh from serving consecutive terms. This law precluded incumbent mayor Edward V. Babcock from running for re-election.

The nonpartisan election law governing the previous two mayoral elections was repealed, bringing an end to the nonpartisan blanket primary and a return to the party system.

== Republican primary ==
Former mayor William A. Magee, who had run for a non-consecutive second term in 1917 but lost to Babcock, ran yet again and won the Republican nomination over Joseph N. Mackrell. Magee's victory was aided by a truce in an ongoing feud with Republican boss and "Maker of Mayors" Max Leslie.

== General election ==
In the November general election, Magee easily defeated Democratic candidate William N. McNair. McNair would be elected mayor twelve years later, ushering in an era of Democratic dominance in city politics.

Pittsburgh mayoral election, 1921
Party	Candidate	Votes	%
Republican	William A. Magee	77,367	67.9
Democratic	William N. McNair*	34,492	30.3
Socialist	William J. Van Essen	2,034	1.8
Industrialist	George W. Ohls	73	0.1
Total votes		113,966	100.0

*McNair was also the nominee of the Prohibition and "Lincoln" parties.

Preceded by 1917	Pittsburgh mayoral election 1921	Succeeded by 1925
