= 1917 Pittsburgh mayoral election =

- November 6, 1917
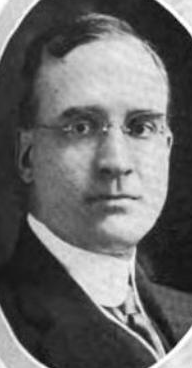
Nominee	Edward V. Babcock	William A. Magee
Popular vote	40,691	36,136
Percentage	52.9%	47.0%
Mayor before election
Joseph G. Armstrong
Elected Mayor
Edward V. Babcock

The 1917 Pittsburgh mayoral election was held on Tuesday, November 6, Edward V. Babcock was elected over William A. Magee in a nonpartisan election.

== Primary election ==
The 1917 contest was conducted under a nonpartisan election law that eliminated party labels from ballots and replaced party primaries with a single nonpartisan blanket primary. This law, enacted prior to the 1913 election, remained in effect until it was repealed prior to the 1921 race.

Incumbent mayor Joseph G. Armstrong was ineligible for re-election owing to a law then in force preventing mayors from serving consecutive terms. Former mayor William A. Magee, who was similarly barred from succeeding himself in 1913, sought the office again in 1917. His main opponents were lumber magnate and former city councilman Edward V. Babcock and city council president Dr. James P. Kerr.

The primary vote was as follows: Babcock, 31,138; Magee, 25,925; and Kerr, 16,620; with a small number of votes going to five other candidates.

== Final election ==
A final election round was held between the top two finishers in the primary, with Babcock beating Magee by 4,555 votes. Kerr and socialist Albert R. Jerling received a smattering of write-in votes.

Pittsburgh mayoral election, 1917
Candidate	Votes	%
Edward V. Babcock	40,691	52.9
William A. Magee	36,136	47.0
Albert R. Jerling	79	0.1
James P. Kerr	16	0.02
Total votes	76,922	100.0

Preceded by 1913	Pittsburgh mayoral election 1917	Succeeded by 1921
