= 1933 Pittsburgh mayoral election =

American municipal election

- November 6, 1933
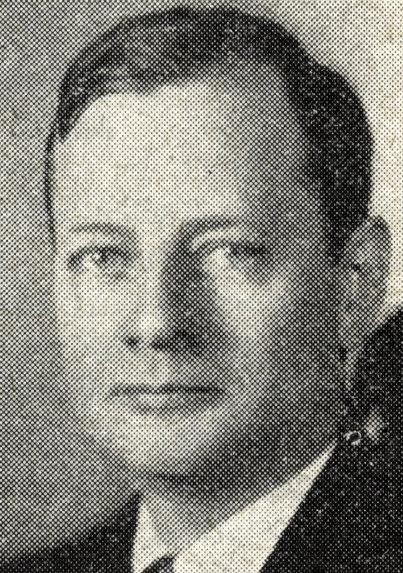

Nominee	William N. McNair	John Herron
Party	Democratic	Republican
Popular vote	102,867	75,674
Percentage	57.3%	42.2%
Mayor before election
John Herron
Republican
Elected Mayor
William N. McNair
Democratic

The Mayoral election of 1933 in Pittsburgh, Pennsylvania was held on Tuesday, November 6, 1933. In a realigning election, Democrats regained control of the mayor's office for the first time in twenty-eight years; they have not relinquished this position since.

== Background ==
The incumbent mayor, John Herron of the Republican Party chose to run for his first full term. Herron had been elevated to the executive office from his position as city council president after Charles H. Kline resigned due to a fiscal scandal. Herron inherited a party whose once efficient machinery was in crisis.

Democrats, led by new powerful grassroots organizer David Lawrence (a future mayor), selected William McNair, an idealistic and outspoken attorney as their candidate. As the New Deal began, Pittsburgh's strong labor community moved rapidly toward the Democrats, creating a huge shift in voting patterns and allowing McNair to win.

== Primary elections ==
Incumbent mayor John Herron won a divided Republican Primary against Councilman Peter J. McArdle and Register of Wills Joseph Mackrell.

William McNair won the Democratic Primary.

== General election ==
A total of 179,425 votes were cast.

Pittsburgh mayoral election, 1933
Party	Candidate	Votes	%
Democratic	William N. McNair	102,867	57.3
Republican	John S. Herron* (incumbent)	75,674	42.2
Socialist	William J. Van Essen	418	0.2
Liberal, Square Deal	Joseph N. Mackrell†	255	0.1
Prohibition	George D. Harger	211	0.1
Total votes		179,425	100.0

*Herron received 75,405 votes on the Republican ticket, 258 on the Citizens' Party ticket, and 11 on non-partisan ballots.
†Mackrell received 154 votes on Liberal Party and 101 on Square Deal Party ballots.

Preceded by 1929	Pittsburgh mayoral election 1933	Succeeded by 1937
