= 1925 Pittsburgh mayoral election =

- November 3, 1925
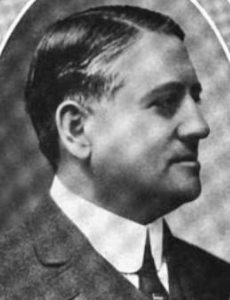
Nominee	Charles H. Kline	William L. Smith	Carman C. Johnson
Party	Republican	Independent	Democratic
Popular vote	69,831	15,210	5,342
Percentage	76.6%	16.7%	5.9%
Mayor before election
William A. Magee
Republican
Elected Mayor
Charles H. Kline
Republican

The 1925 Pittsburgh mayoral election was held on Tuesday, 3 November 1925. It resulted in a landslide victory for Republican candidate Charles H. Kline.

== Republican primary ==
Incumbent Republican mayor William A. Magee's career took a downturn when he broke with state Senator Max G. Leslie, a party boss who had sponsored Magee's candidacy in the previous election. Leslie, determined to prevent the mayor's re-election, pushed for Judge Charles H. Kline of the Allegheny County Court of Common Pleas to succeed Magee. Kline attracted endorsements from other Republican leaders, including William Larimer Mellon, who along with his uncle Andrew W. Mellon was commonly (if not accurately) credited with controlling Pittsburgh politics. Faced with dwindling party support and a shortage of campaign funds, Magee withdrew from the field.

With Magee out of the running, the Republican primary was just a formality as Kline trounced William L. Smith, principal of Allegheny High School.

== General election ==
In the general election, Kline trampled his token opposition. His opponents were Smith, who had re-entered the race on Non-Partisan and Prohibition tickets, and little-known Democrat Carman C. Johnson, a teacher at Westinghouse High School.

The Republican Party also won all seats by an overwhelming margin in the coinciding city council elections.

Pittsburgh mayoral election, 1925
Party	Candidate	Votes	%
Republican	Charles H. Kline*	69,831	76.6
Non-Partisan / Prohibition	William L. Smith†	15,210	16.7
Democratic	Carman C. Johnson	5,342	5.9
Socialist	William J. Van Essen	638	0.7
Independent Citizens	Louis G. Karzis	166	0.2
Total votes		91,187	100.0

*Kline received 68,469 votes on the Republican ticket and 1,362 votes on the Labor Party slate.
†Smith received 10,745 votes on Non-Partisan and 4,465 votes on Prohibition ballots.

Preceded by 1921	Pittsburgh mayoral election 1925	Succeeded by 1929
