= North Park (Pittsburgh) =

County park in Allegheny County, Pennsylvania

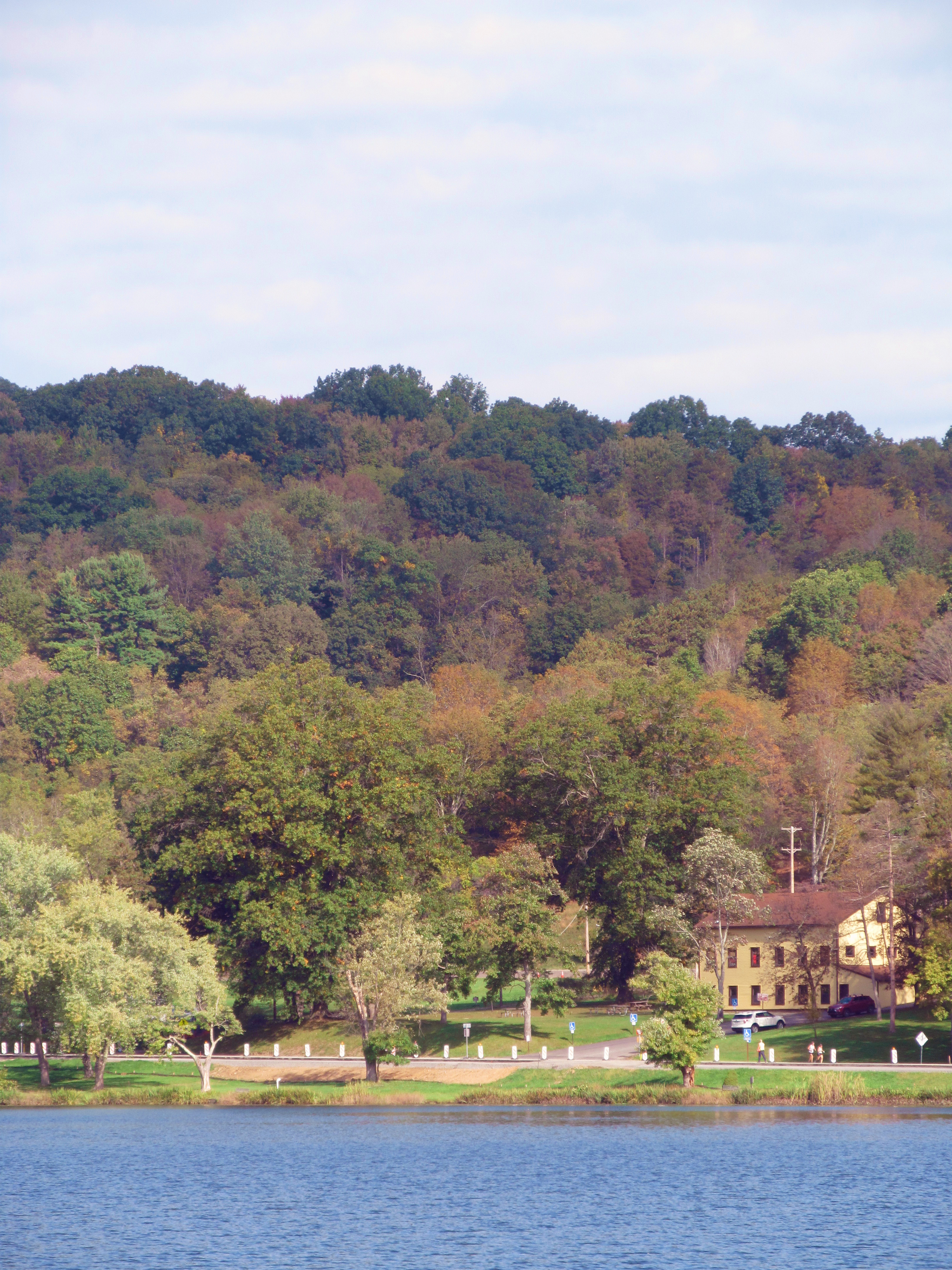
- North Park Lake and the Rose Barn, pictured in 2021.

- Location within Pennsylvania Location within the United States
- Type: County
- Location: Allegheny County, Pennsylvania
- Coordinates: 40.5939°N 79.99690°W
- Area: 3,075-acre (12 km^{2})
- Created: June 18, 1927 (99 years ago)

North Park is a 3,075-acre (12 km^{2}) county park located in Allegheny County, Pennsylvania, United States. It is the largest in the county's 12,000-acre (49 km²) network of nine parks managed by the Allegheny County Department of Parks, Recreation, and Conservation. The park is located 15 miles (24 km) northeast of downtown Pittsburgh in Hampton, McCandless, and Pine Townships.

== History ==
=== Early land use and acquisition ===
Local traditions and historical anecdotes suggest that the area now encompassed by North Park may have been the site of earlier Native American settlement. In the 1940s, amateur accounts circulated of unusually large skeletons purportedly unearthed during excavations in the park, contributing to enduring local legends about a so-called race of "giant people" mentioned in Lenape oral history.

In more recent history, before its establishment as a county park, the land that would become North Park was rural countryside, occupied by farms, homesteads, and small enterprises. Prominent local families such as the Pearces, Irwins, Beveridges, Wagners, and Guytons owned substantial tracts, many of which were later acquired by Allegheny County between 1927 and 1931. Portions of the parkland included farmland once operated by William McKinney, whose barn, still standing on McKinney Road, was later repurposed by the county to house police horses. Cole's Tavern, run by John B. Cole and his wife Matilda, was a notable local establishment situated within the current park boundaries. Irwin Road, which cuts through the park, was named for the Irwin family and once passed through an agricultural hamlet that included a fruit market, blacksmith shop, and later, two orphanages operated by the Pittsburgh Bible Institute.

One notable inholding within the park is St. Paul's Evangelical Lutheran Church, located on Parish Hill along Walter Road. The church property, which includes a cemetery, has been entirely surrounded by parkland since the creation of North Park; the congregation was established in 1854, and the current building dates to 1874.

=== Foundation and vision ===
North Park was created during a period of rapid urbanization in Allegheny County in the late 1920s, when farmland extended nearly to Pittsburgh's city limits. In response to concerns about vanishing green space, County Commissioner Edward V. Babcock proposed the acquisition of large tracts of rural land to be preserved as public parks. Babcock personally purchased farmland north and south of the city, which he then resold to the county at cost. His plan led to the formation of the Allegheny County Bureau of Parks in 1927 and the establishment of North and South Parks as the system’s foundational sites.

The park was formally established by resolution on February 7, 1927, and its dedication followed later that year on June 18. The landscape architect Paul B. Riis, a former National Park Service planner, was recruited to oversee the design as Parks Director. Riis emphasized naturalistic landscaping in his planning, and made extensive use of native trees such as oak, maple, and beech, supplemented by flowering species like dogwoods and cherries. The park’s current forests are the product of early reforestation efforts under Riis's direction. Facilities were constructed using on-site resources, including stone, timber, and topsoil. The park's road system, golf course, lake, and rustic structures reflect Riis’s integration of National Park aesthetics into a regional park context.

=== Buffalo herd and Blackfeet Indians ===
One of the most unusual and short-lived features of early North Park was Allegheny County's decision to incorporate members of the Blackfeet Nation from Browning, Montana as live-in caretakers of a newly established wildlife preserve. In 1928, two family groups were brought to the county: "Chief" Eddie Big Beaver from the Blackfeet community and his family settled in North Park, and a group led by Eagle Ribs, who was reportedly Sioux from the Rosebud Indian Reservation in South Dakota, was placed in South Park. (Note: A later newspaper account notes that Eagle Ribs had been brought in as a later replacement for an original caretaker, Two Eagles, who had arrived in January 1928 with his wife Kouo-a. Two Eagles was discharged "for an alleged warlike attack on Custodian Robert Nicholson.") The county tasked the families with caring for a herd of 36 buffalo and other wildlife which were brought into the parks in late 1927 — white-tailed deer and squirrels were introduced, though plans for a moose herd ultimately fell through. The arrival of a buffalo herd, transported in a motor caravan reportedly led by a tank and followed by press cars, had been heavily publicized. The family of caretakers settled on Flagstaff Hill, the highest point in North Park.

Eddie Big Beaver's wife, referred to in contemporary newspapers as "Princess Mudhen," gave birth to a daughter at Magee Hospital in September 1929, naming her in honor of County Commissioner Joseph G. Armstrong. In October 1930, it was reported that Big Beaver was receiving a county salary of $150 per month ($2,891 in 2025).

The initiative came to an end within a few years. A 1980s history of the park claimed that the caretakers’ traditional use of the bison for food and clothing conflicted with the county’s intention to maintain the animals purely as a scenic attraction. However, contemporary reports emphasized personal reasons: illness, homesickness, and isolation. Eagle Ribs was the first to resign, departing in June 1928 to the disappointment of residents of Bethel Park, who circulated a petition to retain him. He was replaced by Red Horn, who likewise returned to Montana in April 1929. On March 24, 1931, Eddie Big Beaver submitted his resignation to Parks Director Paul Riis, citing his wife's poor health and the family's desire to return home. (Note: According to a 1997 retrospective article in the Pittsburgh Post-Gazette, the episode illustrates how Indigenous individuals were sometimes presented as cultural spectacles in public venues during the early 20th century, reflecting the prevailing societal attitudes of the time. Titles such as "chief" and "princess," frequently used in newspaper coverage, were often inaccurate or culturally inappropriate. Representatives of the Blackfeet Nation and the Council of Three Rivers American Indian Center interviewed for the article noted that such titles were frequently assigned by non-Native observers unfamiliar with tribal customs. Joyce Spoonhunter of the Blackfeet Tribal Council described the use of Native Americans as park attractions as a common, if problematic, practice during that era. Tomi Simms emphasized that within Native cultures, leadership titles are earned, not casually bestowed. The article further suggests that the social isolation of the Blackfeet families in North Park, cut off from familiar religious, educational, and community institutions, may have contributed to their decision to return home.)

The buffalo herd at North Park dwindled to ten animals by 1933 and was ultimately relocated to South Park in 1940. South Park's buffalo herd remains a popular feature of that park today.

The Blackfeet families' presence at North Park coincided with other Native American-themed installations that reflected the cultural assumptions of the period. A 40-foot (12 m) totem pole carved in 1928 by Chief William Shelton of the Snohomish Nation was erected on Flagstaff Hill in 1928 or 1929. The pole was removed in 2011 for conservation.

=== Depression-era expansion ===
North Park's land base grew through a series of acquisitions, beginning with the original 1,713 acres (693 ha) purchased in 1927. Additional parcels were added in 1929, 1930, and 1931, acquired from local landowners such as the Pearce, Guyton, McKinney, and Irwin families. Many of these properties included wooded hills, glades, and access roads essential for developing trails and recreational features.

By 1931, North Park had entered the final stage of its initial development. Additional amenities were added in this period, including bridal paths, a bird sanctuary, picnic groves, ball fields, and nature trails, and a beaver meadow. Pine Creek, originally the park's primary water source, dried up during the drought of 1930, prompting the installation of two permanent wells.

Recreational facilities were inaugurated in succession throughout the 1930s. The golf course was dedicated in 1931, followed by the opening of an archery range in 1934, a tennis field house in 1936, and the golf clubhouse later that same year.

North Park's growth in this era was significantly bolstered by federally funded New Deal programs. A Civilian Conservation Corps camp operated within the park from 1933 to 1935, contributing to landscape restoration and infrastructure development. In 1935, Lake Marshall was completed as a Civil Works Administration project, supplying water to the golf course and serving as a source for firefighting. By 1937, a major phase of construction funded in part by the Public Works Administration reached completion. This included the swimming pool, as well as the primary lake of the park (North Park Lake), a boathouse, a lodge, and a standpipe water tower. In 1938, camp shelters were constructed at West Ridge, Hemlock, and Irwin Run to provide services to underprivileged children.

The park was intended to serve as a "people's country club" in contrast to the private country clubs of the era. Amenities such as golf courses, tennis courts, and picnic groves were made available to the public regardless of income. The opening of the vast swimming pool in July 1937 drew thousands of visitors. Likewise, the creation of North Park Lake, stocked for recreational fishing, was a deliberate effort to provide accessible outdoor activities for Allegheny County's growing suburban population. On the first day of the 1937 fishing season, an estimated 50,000 people lined the lake as County Commissioner John J. Kane cast the ceremonial first line, an event broadcast live on KDKA radio.

=== Later additions ===
Over the following decades, North Park continued to evolve with new amenities and land acquisitions reflecting changing public needs. A trap and skeet shooting range was dedicated in 1941 (destroyed by fire in 1950), and an arboretum was planted the same year. During World War II, the park housed an Aircraft Warning Service observation tower. From 1954 to 1963, a Nike missile site operated within park bounds as part of Cold War air defense infrastructure; the site is now occupied by the Allegheny County Fire Academy.

The park's ice skating rink opened on December 27, 1960, and the Latodami Nature Center was established in 1969 to provide environmental education. That same year, the county acquired the 232-acre (94 ha) Richard Horning estate, expanding the park’s area.

J. C. Stone Field was dedicated on September 1, 1971, named in honor of a local Army Reserve casualty of the Vietnam War.

In December 2020, the nonprofit Allegheny Land Trust donated approximately 20 undeveloped acres to the park in three parcels in Hampton Township. The land included areas along Pine Creek and Montour Run, offering environmental benefits such as stormwater retention and wildlife habitat. The parcels, already frequented by anglers and visitors, were transferred to county ownership with no plans for future development, ensuring public access and conservation in perpetuity.

== Features ==
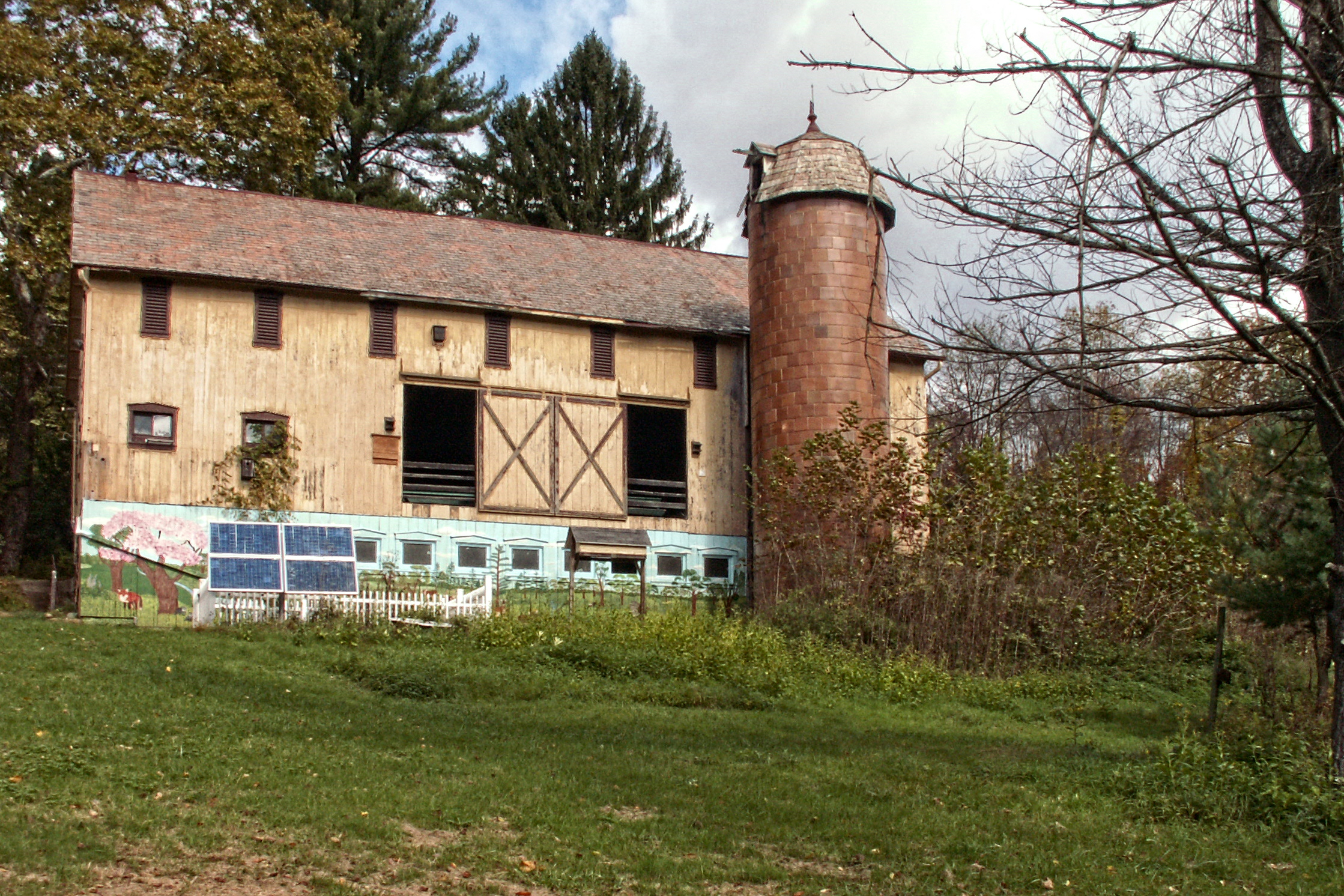
Latodami Nature Center, pictured in 2015.

=== North Park Lake ===
The 66-acre (27 ha) North Park Lake, the park's central water feature, is the largest man‑made body of water in Allegheny County. The lake is bordered by 4.5 square miles (12 km^{2}) of woodlands and supports recreational activities such as fishing and kayaking.

In 2002, a federal grant of $7 million from the Army Corps of Engineers was secured to support future dredging and restoration work on the lake. From 2009 to 2012, a $21 million restoration project led by Allegheny County, the Army Corps, and the Pennsylvania Fish and Boat Commission removed nearly 300,000 cubic yards (230,000 m^{3}) of sediment that had accumulated since the lake's completion in 1936, reducing its depth by up to ten feet and converting 15 acres of open water into marshland. The restoration included erosion control on Pine Creek and Irwin Run, the installation of fish habitat structures, and efforts to restore native vegetation. Following completion, the lake was restocked with largemouth bass, channel catfish, white crappie, bluegill, and other warm-water species, along with seasonal trout plantings. Public fishing resumed in January 2012.

Today, North Park Lake remains a popular destination for recreational fishing, particularly during Pennsylvania's statewide trout season, which begins annually on the first Saturday of April. It is stocked with rainbow, brown, and brook trout, with rainbow trout comprising approximately 75 percent of the total due to their higher retention and lower straying tendencies. The lake is recognized as one of the busiest fishing spots in Allegheny County.

=== Lake Marshall ===
Lake Marshall is a 14-acre (5.7 ha) reservoir in North Park constructed between 1933 and 1935 as part of a New Deal initiative to supply water for the park's golf course, fire hydrants, and facilities. The project was initially undertaken by the Civilian Conservation Corps, followed by the Civil Works Administration, and later completed with support from the Public Works Administration, which also built the adjacent filtration plant and standpipe. Located near the intersection of Pearce Mill and McKinney Roads, the lake features a distinctive stone spillway and has historically served multiple park functions, including winter ice skating and supplying fish stock for the larger North Park Lake downstream. Fishing has traditionally been restricted at Lake Marshall.

At the center of the lake is a small island which for decades was a popular spot for families to feed ducks and geese. This practice, however, led to serious ecological and maintenance issues. By the late 1990s, overfeeding had caused water pollution, aggressive bird behavior, and a rodent infestation severe enough to warrant an eight-month closure of the island for extermination and walkway repairs. In response, county officials implemented a no-feeding policy in 1997, later reinforced with posted signs and public education efforts discouraging visitors from feeding the birds.

=== Boathouse ===
The North Park boathouse was constructed as part of a broader New Deal-era development project and completed in October 1937. Situated on a low peninsula opposite the dam, the boathouse was designed to support recreational boating and provide scenic access to North Park Lake. The stone-faced structure was built with Public Works Administration funding at a total project cost of $64,539 ($1.45 million in 2025), and included amenities such as docks and automobile parking facilities. It was designed by architect Henry Hornbostel, who succeeded Paul Riis as county park director and oversaw several major Depression-era construction projects in the park.

Since 2011, the nonprofit organization Venture Outdoors has operated a seasonal rental facility at the boathouse, offering kayaks, canoes, paddleboats, and bicycles for public use. The calm waters of North Park Lake have made it a popular destination for beginner kayakers, with more than 9,000 rentals recorded in 2013 alone.

Following decades of limited use, the interior of the boathouse underwent significant renovation in 2013 with the opening of the Over the Bar Bicycle Café, a full-service restaurant. The privately funded project cost approximately $500,000.

=== Lodge and observation tower ===
Completed in 1936, the North Park Lodge was one of the park's most significant Works Progress Administration (WPA) projects. Designed by architect Kenneth Saylor, the two-story lodge featured a bar, large kitchen, and outdoor stage, and was envisioned as a durable, rustic clubhouse accessible to the general public. WPA funds also supported construction of the lodge's original oak furniture and the grading and paving of North Ridge Drive to improve access.

Finished in the same year as the lodge, the North Park standpipe water tower originally served as a 300,000-US-gallon (1,100,000 L) storage facility and formed part of the park's Depression-era infrastructure. Standing 102 feet (31 m) tall and 25 feet (7.6 m) in diameter, the structure features an external spiral staircase leading to an observation platform. Although closed to the public for several decades, the tower was identified in Allegheny County's 2002 Parks Comprehensive Master Plan as a candidate for adaptive reuse. In 2022, the county initiated a restoration project to convert the disused facility into a public overlook. Supported by a $400,000 grant from the Babcock Charitable Trust, the project includes structural assessments and safety upgrades to permit public access. On clear days, the elevated platform offers views extending to the Cathedral of Learning and the U.S. Steel Tower in downtown Pittsburgh.

=== Latodami Nature Center ===
The Latodami Nature Center occupies 250 acres (100 ha) in the northwestern portion of the park, comprising fields, forests, wetlands, and ponds. Originally developed in the early 20th century by Pittsburgh attorney J.D. Brown as a gentleman's farm, the property was named "Latodami" by his descendants as a portmanteau of the names of four family members: Orlando, Antoinette, Davia, and Michelle. Allegheny County acquired the site in 1969 in partnership with the North Area Environmental Council to establish a nature center. Most of the original outbuildings were removed, but the 1914 dairy barn, a tile silo, and two residences remain. The barn was adapted for educational use and now includes local plant and animal displays and a small heated classroom.

Latodami provides year-round environmental programming for schools, scouts, and the public, both onsite and at other county parks. It manages the park's mature meadow habitats and maintains remnant and newly planted apple orchards. Naturalists lead activities such as maple syrup demonstrations, night hikes, litter cleanups, and birdwatching events. The center's trails are open to the public daily from dawn to dusk and include short, family-friendly paths through diverse habitats.

=== Sports and recreation facilities ===
As of 2025, North Park offers extensive recreational amenities, including an 18-hole USGA-ranked golf course, one full-size football field, eight baseball and softball diamonds, eight soccer fields, and three basketball courts. Sixteen tennis courts are clustered around a 1930s clubhouse designed by Kenneth Saylor, the same architect who designed the Lodge. The courts were renovated in 2012. There is also a platform tennis complex operated in partnership with the North Park Platform Tennis Association, which rebuilt and restored several aluminum and wooden courts as well as a warming hut in 2010. The park offers many playgrounds, to which an additional thirteen were added during a 2002 refurbishment initiative.

==== Golf course ====
The park's golf course is an 18-hole public facility that has served Allegheny County since its dedication on June 26, 1931. One of the oldest municipal courses in the region, it was originally constructed by the county and featured a Greek Revival clubhouse, completed in 1938 at a cost of approximately $100,000 ($2.29 million in 2025) and formally dedicated on May 30 of that year. The clubhouse included a dance floor, locker rooms, showers, pro shop, and observation deck. The course itself became a prominent site for amateur tournaments, including the 1965 National Public Links Championship, which drew 150 golfers from across the country. At that time, the par-71 course had been extended to 6,781 yards (6,201 m) and was noted for its demanding terrain, featuring narrow fairways, blind shots, and tricky greens. In the late 1980s, the original golf course service building was razed and replaced with a modern facility as part of a broader $1.5 million ($4.25 million in 2025) rehabilitation of county park infrastructure.

==== Skating rink ====
The North Park Ice Rink opened to the public on February 18, 1961, following two and a half years of construction. At the time of its opening, it was considered one of the largest outdoor skating rinks in the country. The rink measures 209 by 120 feet (64 m × 37 m) and is accompanied by a Swiss chalet-style clubhouse constructed with native stone and reinforced concrete pillars, featuring a lounge with fireplace, skate rental facilities, a snack bar, and an upper observation area. Terrazzo flooring imported from Italy was laid and polished prior to installing the ice surface, and refrigeration machinery is housed in the clubhouse, connected to the rink by a dedicated tunnel. In the 2000–2001 season, the rink drew over 30,000 visitors.

==== Swimming pool ====
Opened on July 5, 1937, the park's swimming pool was once advertised as the largest in the world, capable of holding approximately 2,500,000 US gallons (9,500,000 L) of water. It was designed to accommodate 5,000 swimmers at once and measures 50 by 105 metres (164 by 344 feet).

The adjacent baby pool and spray park reopened in summer 2024 following a county-led renovation.

==== Trails ====
North Park features an extensive trail network for hiking, cycling, and nature observation. The most prominent route is the Lake Trail, a 5-mile (8 km) loop shared by walkers, joggers, and cyclists. It follows park roads around the lake, with a 9-foot (2.7 m) pedestrian path and a separate 5-foot (1.5 m) bike lane on Babcock Boulevard, and continues along the shoulders of Ingomar, Kummer, and Pearce Mill Roads. The park is traversed by the Rachel Carson Trail, a 45.7-mile (73.5 km) regional route connecting North Park to Harrison Hills Park in northeastern Allegheny County. Additional blazed trails throughout the Lake Area are used by hikers and mountain bikers.

Specialized trails include the Braille Trail, designed for visually impaired visitors, and the Ecotherapy Trail, introduced in 2022 with interpretive signage promoting mental and physical well-being through structured interaction with the natural environment.

=== Other facilities and features ===
==== Dog park ====
An off-leash dog area was established around 2004 near Walters Road and later relocated to Pearce Mill Road by 2010. The current facility includes safety gates, water stations, and waste bins.

==== Shelters and groves ====
As of 2002, North Park featured 114 covered picnic shelters, most of which were slated for refurbishment over a two-year period at a projected cost of $150,000. The shelters vary in size and amenities and can be reserved for family gatherings, community events, and seasonal picnics. Among the larger facilities are the Rose Barn (originally "Rose Grove") and Parish Hill buildings, both adapted from original barn structures used as dance halls and picnic groves in the early decades of the park's operation. The park also includes the Scout Cabin, a rustic facility used for youth programming and community events; it underwent major renovations in 1995 as part of a national job-training program coordinated by the Army Reserve and the Boys & Girls Clubs of America. The second floor of the Boathouse can also be rented for private events, along with the Old Fire House.

==== 80th Division Monument ====
Near the intersection of Wildwood Road and Babcock Boulevard stands the 80th Division Monument, featuring a World War I-era field artillery piece and commemorative plaques honoring veterans of both World Wars; it was dedicated in 1941 and enhanced by a surrounding demonstration garden in 1990.

==== Other amenities and features ====
Go Ape North Park, a commercial treetop obstacle course with zip lines, rope bridges, and Tarzan swings, opened in April 2013 through a public-private partnership with Adventure Forest LLC. After a decade in operation, the course closed permanently in November 2022 following the expiration of its lease and concerns over parking capacity.

A lesser-known feature of North Park is the so-called "Fountain of Youth," a small stone structure built over a natural spring in 1938. Formerly popular for bathing and drinking, the spring's water was declared unfit for human consumption in 1955. Though no longer potable, the spring still flows beneath a moss-covered building tucked into the hillside along Kummer Road.

== Ecology ==
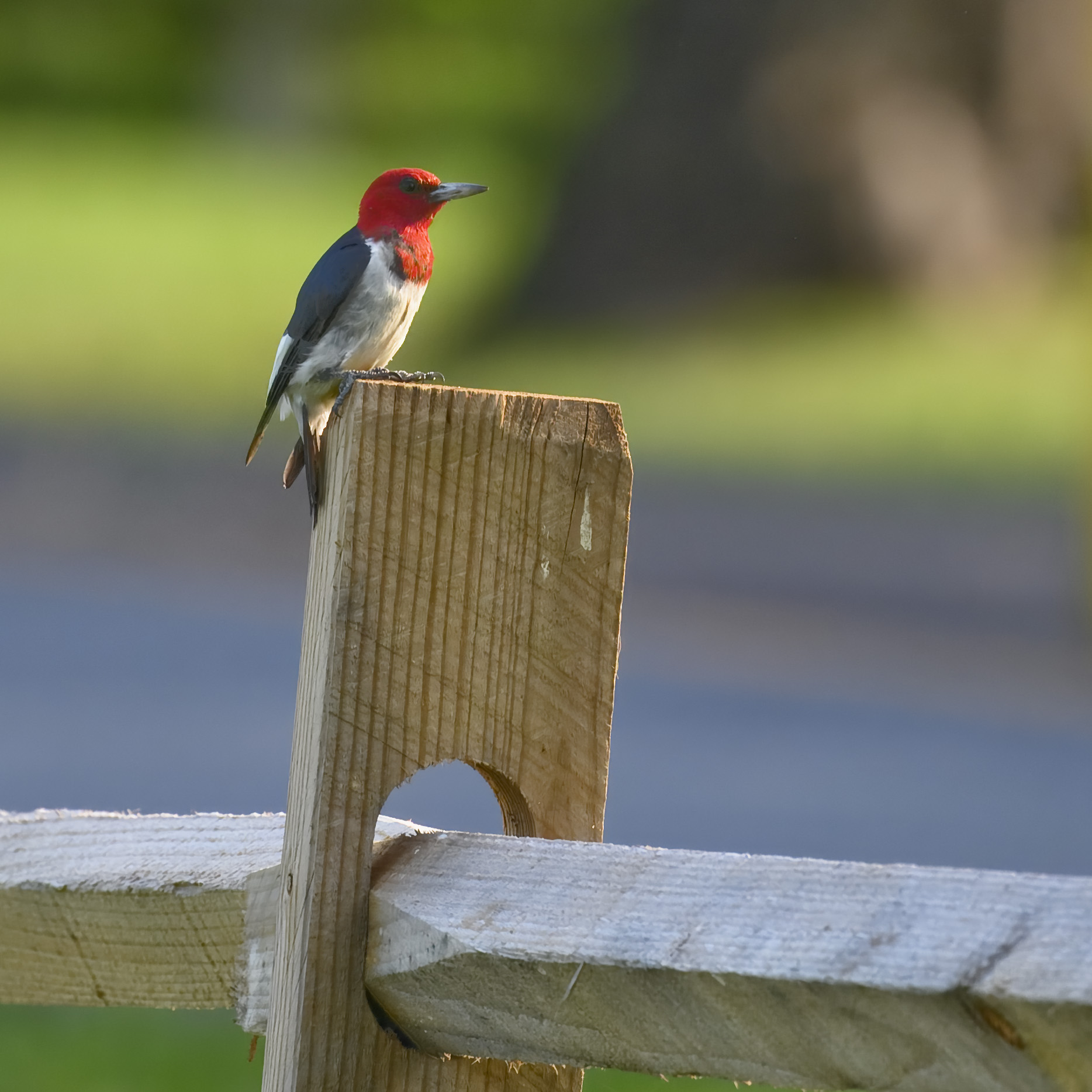
Red-headed woodpeckers returned to nest in North Park in 2024 after an absence of more than three decades.

=== Flora ===
Reforestation in North Park began as early as 1927, using native species such as maple, oak, and beech alongside ornamental trees like dogwood, pear, and cherry to provide seasonal color and fragrance. These early plantings shaped much of the park's modern woodland character. The park contains several high-quality woodlands and diverse habitats, including the Hemlock Grove and Rocky Dell areas, where many trees, such as white oak, sycamore, and catalpa, are over 200 years old.

In 1938, the Works Progress Administration planted 590 pine trees on a hillside near Pearce Mill Road in the shape of a giant five-pointed star, visible only from above. The feature was rediscovered in recent years through aerial imagery.

Since 2009, the nonprofit Pittsburgh Sakura Project has planted more than 280 flowering cherry trees in groves throughout North Park, promoting Japanese–American friendship through the traditional custom of hanami (flower viewing). Annual celebrations are held each spring when the trees bloom, and the groves are maintained by volunteers.

The Latodami Grasslands, a designated habitat restoration area within the park, support a variety of native prairie species, including blanket flower and wild bergamot.

=== Fauna ===
From its inception, North Park has supported a wide array of animal species, both native and introduced. Today the forests, meadows, lakes, and wetlands of the park continue to attract a diversity of bird and mammal life. Over 270 bird species have been recorded on park grounds. Notably, the Latodami Grasslands host with birds such as the American goldfinch and the bobolink.

In July 2025, the return of red-headed woodpeckers to North Park marked the first confirmed nesting of the species in Allegheny County in at least 35 years. The birds, known for their striking plumage and acorn-rich diets, require specialized habitat conditions such as open oak woodlands near water and have been observed frequenting the fields near the North Park swimming pool.

Earlier in 2025, a Ross's goose was recorded at North Park during the 2024 Pittsburgh Christmas Bird Count, marking its third appearance on record. Other waterfowl such as common mergansers and pied-billed grebes were also observed in unusually high numbers due to warmer weather and open water conditions. Bald eagles are frequently sighted in North Park. A nesting pair was first observed in 2018 and constructed a nest near the skating rink and the Rachel Carson Trail the following year, though no eggs were laid in their initial attempt. The lake also supports wetland birds such as the green heron, which has been documented along its shoreline, along with the great blue heron and osprey.

Among amphibians and reptiles, the park is home to species such as salamanders, the northern spring peeper, and the midland painted turtle.

Since 1997, bowhunting has been permitted in a specified area of North Park in the winter to cull the deer herd.

== "Blue Mist Road" ==
Persistent urban legends in the North Hills center on Blue Mist Road, the local name for a remote and unlit stretch of Irwin Road that runs through North Park. Its isolation, dense tree cover, and lack of lighting have contributed to a longstanding reputation for paranormal activity. The road is associated with ghost stories which have been passed down across generations.

Accounts commonly describe a bluish mist that appears at dusk, as well as reports of unusual lights, sounds, and apparitions. Popular tales include the alleged murder of a family and burial of their remains in a septic tank; a nearby cemetery where two leaning headstones, said to represent a bride and groom, are rumored to inch closer together over time; and the sound of distant drumming attributed to Native American spirits. Other stories reference sightings of orbs, bodies hanging from trees, and an animal-human hybrid. Some versions claim the road was once the site of Ku Klux Klan activity, or that occult rituals were held near the ruins of old foundations in the woods.

The stories surrounding Blue Mist Road follow a trajectory common in 20th-century American urban legends, with themes evolving from ghost stories involving young couples in the 1960s to more sensational accounts of cult activity and hidden violence during the "Satanic Panic" era of the 1980s.

According to folklore, honking one's car horn three times at a specific location is said to provoke a paranormal response. Some accounts also describe a "gravity hill" effect, in which parked cars are said to roll uphill when left in neutral, a phenomenon typically attributed to optical illusion—though in the case of Blue Mist Road, the motion is popularly ascribed to the actions of spirits.

A similar phenomenon occurs at a stop sign on nearby McKinney Road, where vehicles placed in neutral appear to roll uphill against gravity. Known locally as a Gravity Hill or Magnetic Hill, the site is a popular curiosity among park visitors. The effect, however, is the result of an optical illusion caused by the surrounding landscape rather than any supernatural force.
