= List of elections in 1913 =

The following elections occurred in the year 1913.

- 1913 Bolivian presidential election
- 1913 Costa Rican general election
- 1913 Danish Folketing election
- 1913 Danish local elections
- 1913 Dutch general election
- 1913 Finnish parliamentary election
- 1913 Italian general election
- 1913 Newfoundland general election
- 1913 Uruguayan parliamentary election

== Europe ==
- 1913 Bulgarian parliamentary election
- 1913 Croatian parliamentary election
- 1913 Portuguese legislative election

=== United Kingdom ===
- 1913 Altrincham by-election
- 1913 Chesterfield by-election
- 1913 Chorley by-election
- 1913 Dover by-election
- 1913 East Antrim by-election
- 1913 East Waterford by-election
- 1913 Flint Boroughs by-election
- 1913 Houghton-le-Spring by-election
- 1913 Keighley by-election
- 1913 Kendal by-election
- 1913 Leicester by-election
- 1913 Leix by-election
- 1913 Linlithgowshire by-election
- 1913 Londonderry City by-election
- 1913 Newmarket by-election
- 1913 North Cork by-election
- 1913 Reading by-election
- 1913 Shrewsbury by-election
- 1913 South Lanarkshire by-election
- 1913 St George's, Hanover Square by-election
- 1913 Wandsworth by-election
- 1913 Whitechapel by-election
- 1913 Wick Burghs by-election

== North America ==
=== Canada ===
- 1913 Alberta general election
- 1913 Edmonton municipal election
- 1913 Newfoundland general election
- 1913 Toronto municipal election

=== United States ===
- 1913 New York state election

==== United States gubernatorial ====
- 1913 Arkansas gubernatorial special election
- 1913 Massachusetts gubernatorial election
- 1913 New Jersey gubernatorial election
- 1913 United States gubernatorial elections
- 1913 Virginia gubernatorial election

==== United States House of Representatives ====
- 1913 United States House of Representatives elections

==== United States Senate ====
- 1912–13 United States Senate elections
- 1913 United States Senate election in Georgia
- 1913 United States Senate election in Idaho
- 1913 United States Senate special election in Idaho
- 1913 United States Senate elections in Illinois
- 1913 United States Senate election in Iowa
- 1913 United States Senate special election in Maryland
- 1913 United States Senate election in Massachusetts
- 1913 United States Senate election in New Jersey
- 1913 United States Senate election in South Carolina

==== United States mayoral elections ====
- 1913 Los Angeles mayoral election
- 1913 New York City mayoral election
- 1913 Pittsburgh mayoral election
- 1913 San Diego mayoral election

== Oceania ==
=== Australia ===
- 1913 Australian Senate election
- 1913 Australian federal election
- 1913 Australian referendum
- 1913 Blayney state by-election
- 1913 Kalgoorlie by-election
- 1913 New South Wales state election
- 1913 Tasmanian state election
- 1913 Wollondilly state by-election
- 1913 Yass state by-election

=== New Zealand ===
- 1913 Grey by-election
- 1913 Lyttelton by-election

== See also ==
- Category:1913 elections
