= 1909 Pittsburgh mayoral election =

- February 16, 1909
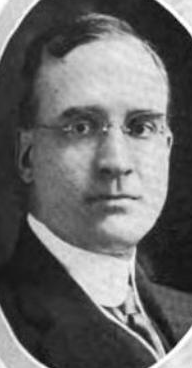
Nominee	William A. Magee	William H. Stevenson	George R. Herst
Party	Republican	Civic / Prohibition	Democratic
Popular vote	48,065	17,008	3,075
Percentage	69.6%	24.6%	4.5%
Mayor before election
George W. Guthrie
Democratic
Elected Mayor
William A. Magee
Republican

The 1909 Pittsburgh mayoral election was held on Tuesday, February 16, 1909. Republican nominee William A. Magee was elected mayor of Pittsburgh over Civic Party and Prohibition candidate W.H. Stevenson and Democratic candidate George R. Herst.

== Campaign ==
Former city councilman and state senator William A. Magee, an unsuccessful candidate in the 1906 Republican mayoral primary, decided to run again for mayor in 1909. His campaign emphasized potential civic improvement projects including the removal of a hill ("the hump") in the area around Grant Street, the widening of certain streets, and improvement of riverfronts. Although opposed by some of the Republican leadership, Magee won the Republican primary over city treasurer John F. Steel by a vote of 41,917 to 22,210.

The strongest opposition to the Republicans came from the Civic Party, an organization of anti-corruption reformers. Its nominee was city councilman William H. Stevenson, whose candidacy was also supported by the Prohibition Party.

Dr. George R. Herst won the Democratic primary with no close competitors.

== General election results ==
Pittsburgh mayoral election, 1909
Party	Candidate	Votes	%
Republican	William A. Magee	48,065	69.6
Civic / Prohibition	William H. Stevenson	17,008*	24.6
Democratic	George R. Herst	3,075	4.5
Socialist	J.W. Slayton	792	1.1
Socialist Labor	Edward R. Markley	155	0.2
—	other	5	0.0
Total votes		69,100	100.0

*Stevenson received 13,151 votes on the Civic Party ticket, 3,823 on the Prohibition ticket, and 34 other votes.

Preceded by 1906	Pittsburgh mayoral election 1909	Succeeded by 1913
