= 1929 Pittsburgh mayoral election =

- November 5, 1929
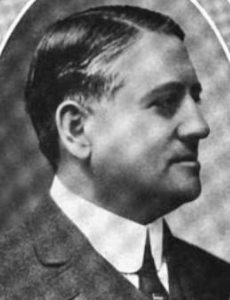

Nominee	Charles H. Kline	Thomas A. Dunn
Party	Republican	Democratic
Popular vote	82,395	38,292
Percentage	67.6%	31.4%
Mayor before election
Charles H. Kline
Republican
Elected Mayor
Charles H. Kline
Republican

The Mayoral election of 1929 in Pittsburgh, Pennsylvania was held on Tuesday, November 5, 1929. Incumbent Republican mayor Charles H. Kline was re-elected over Thomas A. Dunn, who ran on the Democratic and Good Government party tickets. Until this election, no mayor of Pittsburgh had won consecutive terms since Henry A. Weaver in 1858, owing in part to a prior long-standing law prohibiting a mayor from succeeding himself. To date this was the last time a Republican was elected mayor of Pittsburgh.

== Primary elections ==
Prior to the Great Depression, Republicans dominated city politics. In this party's primary, Kline won a plurality of votes over Allegheny County Court of Common Pleas Judge Richard W. Martin and City Council President James F. Malone. Pittsburgh Chamber of Commerce president and future city police chief Dunn, although a registered Republican, entered the race as a Democrat and won that party's primary. Dunn also ran on a "Good Government" ticket, hoping to attract support from independents as well as disgruntled Republicans upset over corruption in the Kline government.

== General election ==
Dunn failed to pull in enough independents to compensate for the anemic Democratic vote as Kline won easily, taking 28 of 30 wards.

Pittsburgh mayoral election, 1929
Party	Candidate	Votes	%
Republican	Charles H. Kline (incumbent)	82,395	67.6
Democratic	Thomas A. Dunn	38,292*	31.4
Socialist	William J. Van Essen	592	0.5
Prohibition	H. Rea Garber	522	0.4
Communist	Emmett Patrick Cush	149	0.1
Total votes		121,950	100.0

*Dunn received 29,838 votes on the Democratic ticket and 8,454 votes on the Good Government slate.

Preceded by 1925	Pittsburgh mayoral election 1929	Succeeded by 1933
