= 1913 Pittsburgh mayoral election =

- November 4, 1913
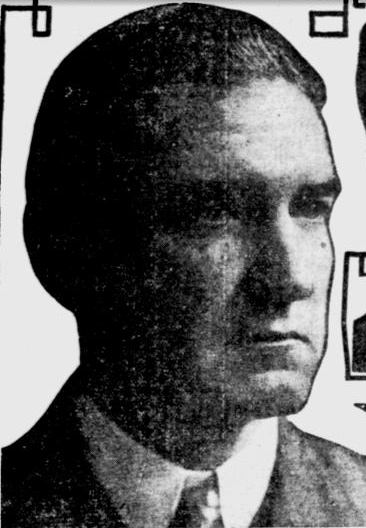

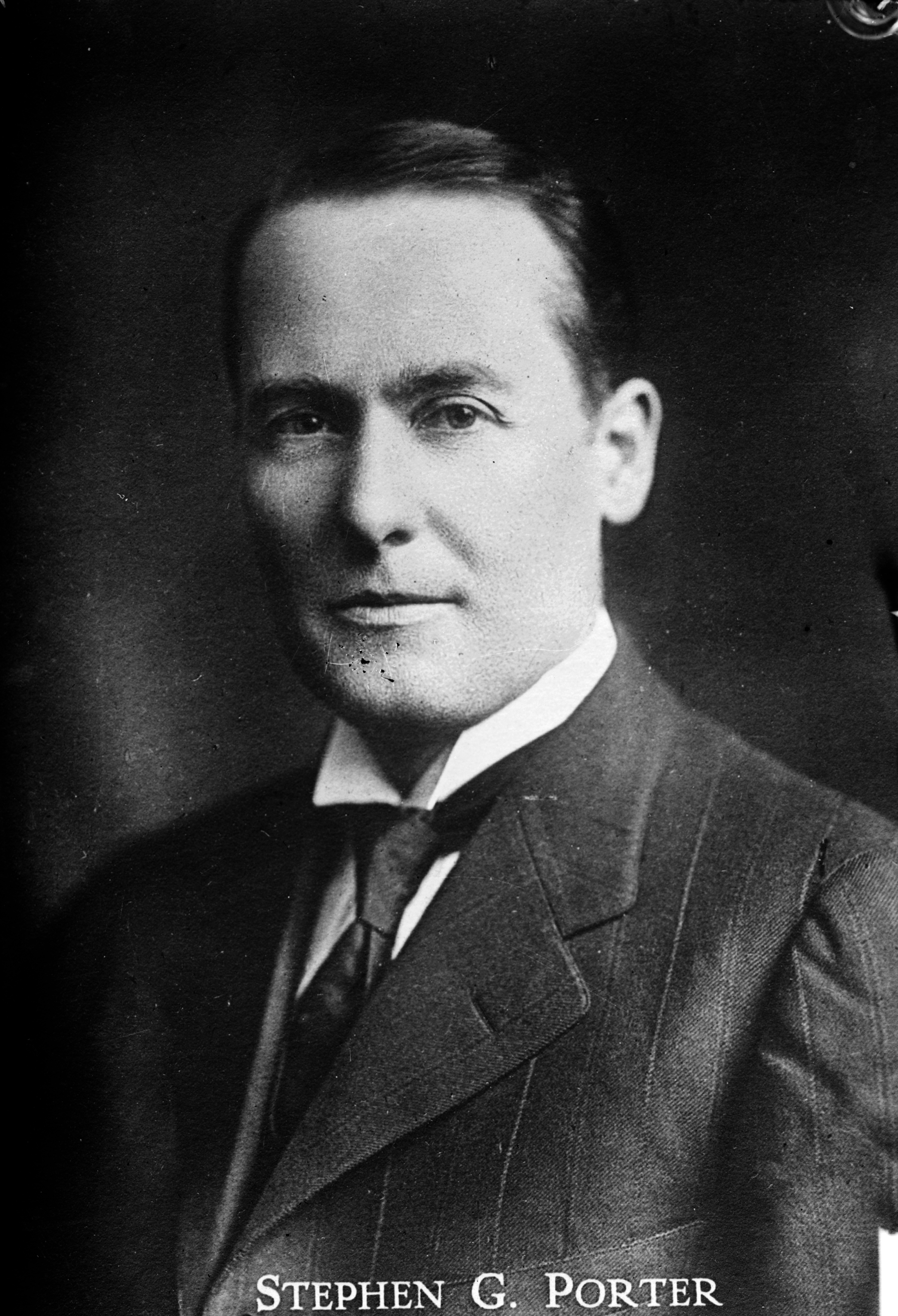
Nominee	Joseph G. Armstrong	Stephen G. Porter
Popular vote	39,912	37,472
Percentage	51.6%	48.4%
Mayor before election
William A. Magee
Republican
Elected Mayor
Joseph G. Armstrong

The 1913 Pittsburgh mayoral election was held on Tuesday, November 4, 1913, in Pittsburgh, Pennsylvania. Joseph G. Armstrong was elected mayor of Pittsburgh over Stephen G. Porter in a nonpartisan election.

== Background ==
The election in 1913 was the first Pittsburgh mayoral contest to be conducted under a new nonpartisan ballot law that eliminated party labels from ballots and replaced the party primaries with a nonpartisan blanket primary.

In the early stages of the campaign, support formed around two candidates, public works director Joseph G. Armstrong and U.S. Representative Stephen G. Porter. Incumbent mayor William A. Magee, who by law was ineligible to run for a consecutive term, gave his support to Porter, as did longtime political boss William Flinn. U.S. Senators George T. Oliver and Boies Penrose and local Republican leader Max G. Leslie backed Armstrong.

== Primary election ==
There were six official candidates in the primary. Although the candidates were officially non-partisan, the press identified Armstrong and Porter as Republicans, Frank I. Gosser as a Democrat, William J. Van Essen as a Socialist, and Robert S. Glass as a Prohibitionist. Victor Breitenstein styled himself as "the workingmen's independent candidate" but rejected a socialist label.

Porter was the top vote-getter, edging second-place Armstrong by 302 votes. The rest of the candidates together captured less than 10 percent of the vote, but this was enough to keep either Porter or Armstrong from attaining a majority.

Pittsburgh mayoral primary election, 1913
Candidate	Votes	%
Stephen G. Porter	35,206	45.6
Joseph G. Armstrong	34,904	45.2
Frank I. Gosser	5,418	7.0
William J. Van Essen	1,464	1.9
Robert S. Glass	152	0.2
Victor Breitenstein	96	0.1
M.W. Clair	1	0.0
Total votes	77,241	100.0

== Runoff ==
As no candidate received a majority of votes in the primary, a runoff election was held between the top two finishers, Porter and Armstrong. This time Armstrong came out ahead of Porter, by a margin of 2,440 votes.

Pittsburgh mayoral runoff election, 1913
Candidate	Votes	%
Joseph G. Armstrong	39,912	51.6
Stephen G. Porter	37,472	48.4
Total votes	77,384	100.0

Preceded by 1909	Pittsburgh mayoral election 1913	Succeeded by 1917
