= Pittsburgh City-County Building =

Seat of government for the City of Pittsburgh

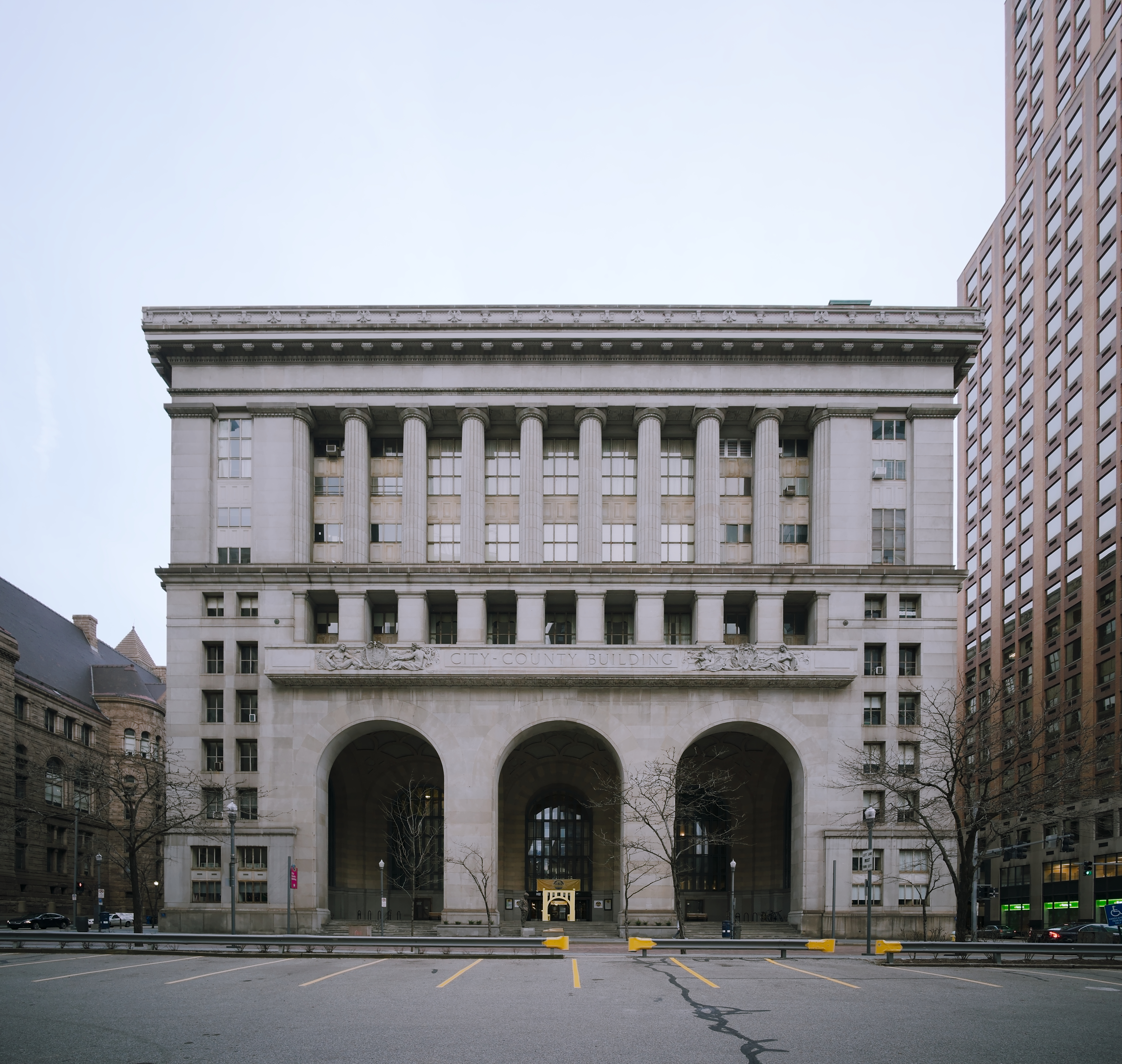

- Location within Pittsburgh
- 40°26′18.12″N 79°59′49.73″W
- Location: 414 Grant Street, Pittsburgh, Pennsylvania

History
- Built: 1914–1917

Site notes
- Area: Downtown
- Architect: Henry Hornbostel
- Governing body: The City of Pittsburgh & Allegheny County

The Pittsburgh City-County Building is the seat of government for the City of Pittsburgh, and houses both city and Allegheny County offices. It is located in Downtown Pittsburgh at 414 Grant Street. Built from 1915 to 1917 it is the third seat of government of Pittsburgh. Today the building is occupied mostly by Pittsburgh offices with Allegheny County located in adjacent county facilities. It also contains a courtroom used for the Pittsburgh sessions of the Supreme Court of Pennsylvania.

== History ==
At the start of the 20th century, city and county officials began to realize that the current structure which housed the city and county government offices was insufficient for the city's rapid growth. The offices at that time were located in the Smithfield Street City Hall building, which was built in 1868-1872. The demand for new offices grew exponentially with the incorporation of Allegheny City into the City of Pittsburgh in 1907, which added 130,000 new residents to the city. In 1909 plans for a new City Hall began. Mayor William A. McGee proposed selling the current offices in the Smithfield Street City Hall and the Public Safety building, and using these funds to buy the Allegheny County Courthouse and use it as the space for construction of a new City Hall. By 1912 the plans moved forward substantially with both the City of Pittsburgh and Allegheny County approving a joint venture to purchase the land and both occupy the new building. The architect for the new building was to be chosen through a competition, only accepting architects residing and doing business within Allegheny County. Regional favoritism was used in the building's construction as well, as in 1914 Mayor Joseph Armstrong claimed that all material for the building should come from manufactures who produce and are located in Pittsburgh, and that all labor employed should be obtained or taken from Allegheny County. The plans for the development of the new building even extended to some of the prominent organization within Pittsburgh such as the Carnegie Library, and the Civic Club of Allegheny County who both had plans for space in the new building. Construction was postponed for more than a year though as the general contracting firm of W. F. Trimble & Sons filed an injunction claiming that the selection of James L. Stuart as consulting and supervising engineer was done through an improper bidding process. The case was eventually decided by the Pennsylvania Supreme Court and resolved by a legislative act, and development on the building was allowed to continue. The groundbreaking on the building occurred with a ceremony on July 6, 1915, with County Commissioner I. K. Campbell striking the first blow with a pick and Joseph G. Armstrong Jr. lifting the first shovel of dirt. Both the pick and the shovel were later silver plated and preserved as mementos in the office of the Mayor. Following significant progress in construction a cornerstone laying ceremony was planned to coincide with the celebration of Pittsburgh's Centennial. On March 18, 1916, the celebration of the 100th anniversary of incorporation was held in Pittsburgh and a parade wound through downtown Pittsburgh ending at a steel-framework of what would become the new City-Council Building. Three cornerstones were laid during the celebration, including one for the City, one for the County, and one for the workers, each of which contained time capsules. The construction on the new building finished in 1917, and was completed under budget. In April 1917, the City Law Department was the first to switch into the new building, with the rest of the remaining offices allocated by June. The building was nominated in January 2016 to become a City Historic Site by Preservation Pittsburgh.

== Architecture ==
In 1914, a competition was held for a new Pittsburgh City Hall. The 16-entry competition led to the commissioning of Edward B. Lee, a respected Pittsburgh architect, with Palmer, Hornbostel, & Jones as associated architects. The completed design was done by Henry Hornbostel.

The building was designed in the Beaux Arts style, with elements of the City Beautiful Movement. The City-County building is a representation of a distinctly American extrapolation of the Beaux Arts mode. Hornbostel was known for this architectural style, and architectural historian James Van Trump has stated that Hornbostel kept the principles of the Beaux Arts central with his designs, but also frequently departed from the precepts, and integrated elements of other styles akin to industrially-inspired brutalism. The design of the building was also influenced by the City Beautiful Movement. This movement featured urban planning with soaring Neoclassical buildings, clean and orderly designs, and included the concept of the "White City". The City-County Building was one of Pittsburgh's first attempts at incorporating the City Beautiful Movement into its urban design.

Some of the most significant design elements of the building include the Grand Lobby, which is a naturally lit atrium with a 47-foot high barrel-vaulted ceiling. The ceiling is held up by bronze columns crafted by Louis Tiffany Studios. They feature at their bases, the Seals of Pittsburgh and Allegheny County, frontiersman Guyasuta, and Pittsburgh's oldest surviving building, the Fort Pitt Blockhouse. The room's ornate elevator doors feature a series of reliefs detailing the previous homes of municipal government. The reliefs age with the buildings they clutch, reaching adulthood with the present City-County Building and Allegheny County Courthouse.

The building is also unique in that most of the furniture was designed by the building's architect, Hornbostel. The Office of the Mayor, Council Chamber, and Supreme Court Room all feature 1917 furniture still in use today.

On the seventh floor of the building is a massive mural completed in 1940 entitled "Justice" by award-winning artist Harry Scheuch.

== Gallery ==
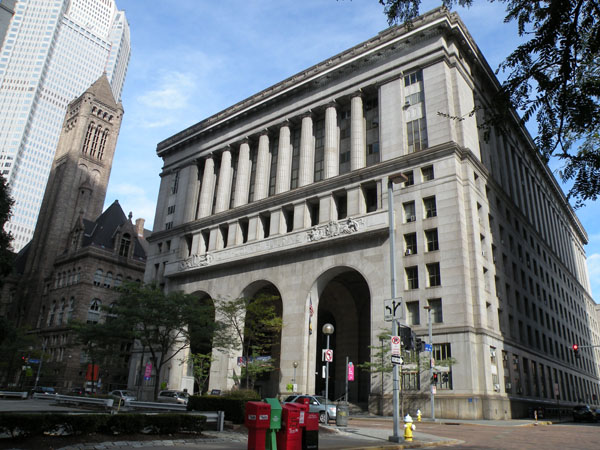
City-Council Building from an angled view

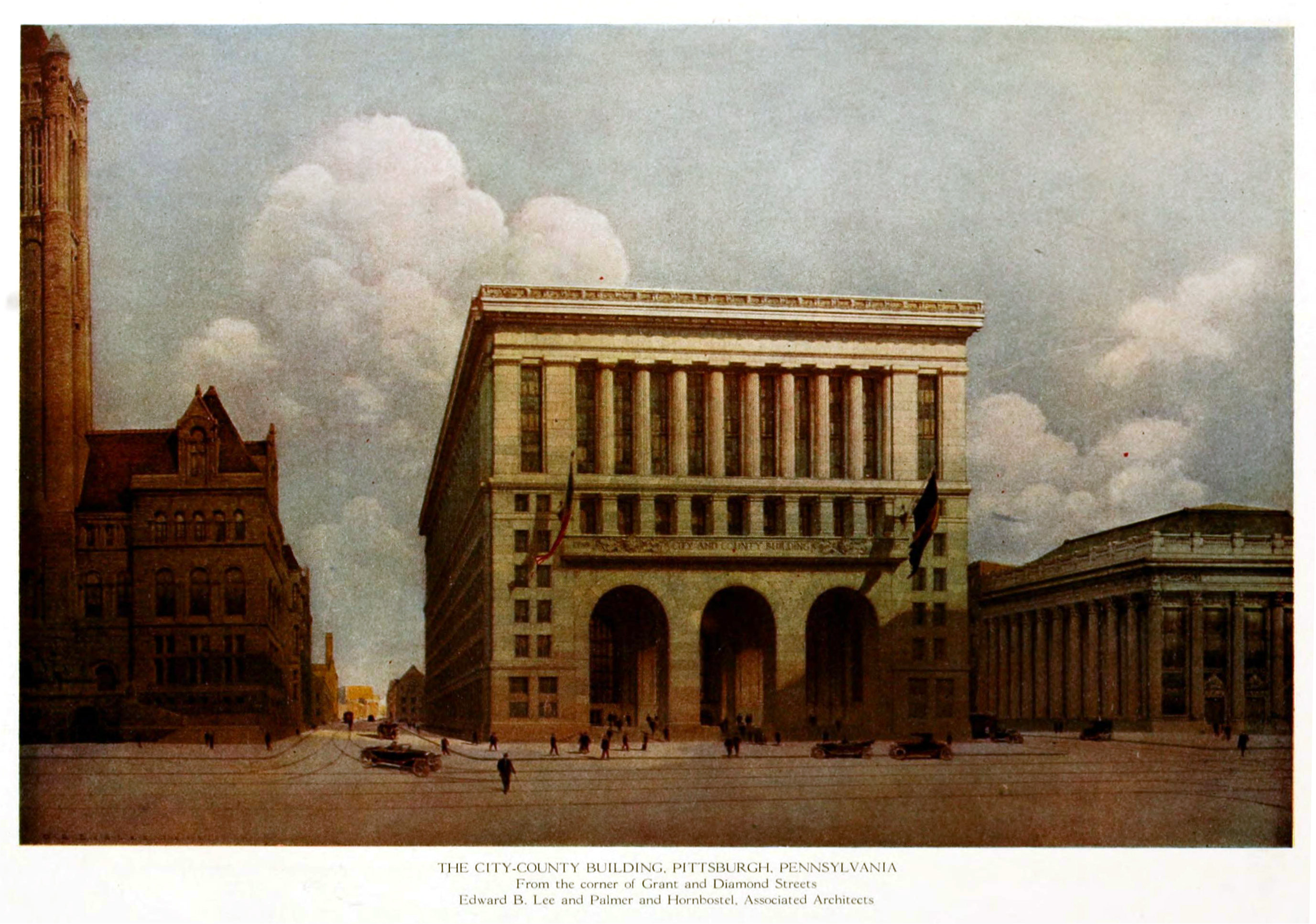
Older photo of Pittsburgh City-Council Building

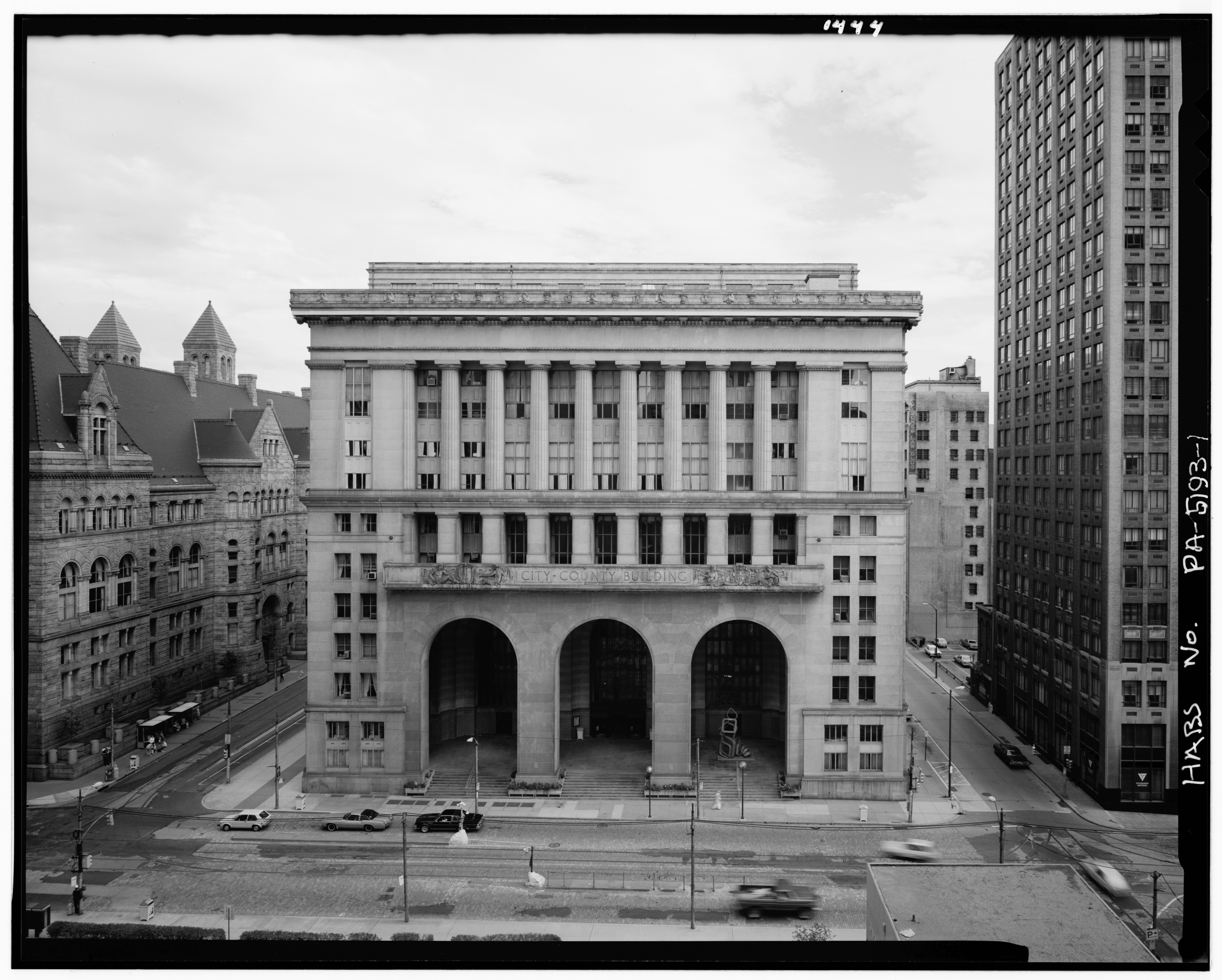
Old photo of the main elevation of the City-Council Building

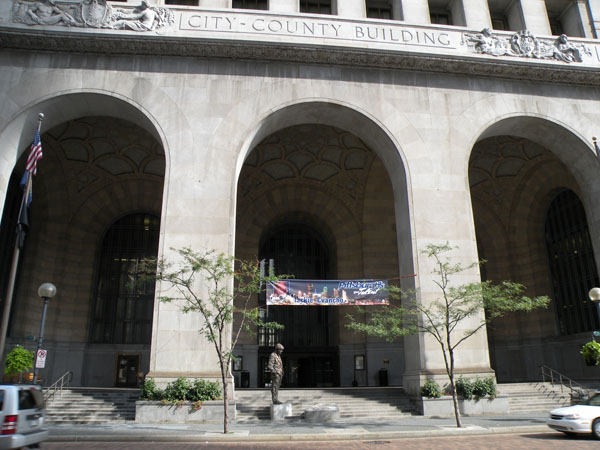
Close-up of the City-Council Building

== Popular culture ==
Pittsburgh Pirates great and future Hall of Famer Honus Wagner helped promote the 1922 film In the Name of the Law by catching baseballs thrown off the roof of City Hall.

Mayor Magee and the City Hall were featured in 1924's Fording the Lincoln Highway.

1992's Lorenzo's Oil used the building to shoot scenes depicting Johns Hopkins Hospital.

Many scenes of the Bruce Willis and Sarah Jessica Parker 1993 police drama Striking Distance were filmed both inside and on the Grant Street entrance to the building. Most notable is the nighttime scene of Dennis Farina's supervisor character arguing with Willis' "Tom Hardy" over the "Polish Hill" documents.

Scenes of the 1997–98 Superman remake Superman Lives were slated to be filmed in the building's "crystal palace" grand mezzanine and serving as Daily Planet offices but production was delayed by Warner Brothers.

== Trivia ==
- The downtown branch of the Carnegie Library of Pittsburgh occupied space in the structure until November, 1930.

== See also ==
- List of state and county courthouses in Pennsylvania
