= Babcock Ranch, Florida =

Planned community in Florida, United States

Babcock Ranch
- Planned community
- Logo

- Location within the state of Florida
- Coordinates: 26°52′28″N 81°43′08″W
- Country: United States
- State: Florida
- Counties: Charlotte, Lee

Area
  - Total: 27 sq mi (69 km^{2})
- Elevation: 33 ft (10 m)

Population (2020)
  - Estimate (2025): 12,500
- Time zone: UTC−05:00 (Eastern (EST))
  - Summer (DST): UTC−04:00 (EDT)
- ZIP codes: 33917, 33982
- Area codes: 239, 941
- GNIS feature ID: 278018
- Website: babcockranch.com

Babcock Ranch is a planned community located in southeastern Charlotte County and northeastern Lee County, Florida, consisting of approximately 17,000 acres (6,900 ha). The community was named after Edward Vose Babcock, a lumber baron and former mayor of Pittsburgh, who purchased the land in 1914. The planned community was approved as part of a public–private partnership with the state and local governments. The deal established the neighboring Babcock Ranch Preserve.

== History ==
=== Origins ===
The land was initially bought in the late 1800s by Perry Wadsworth McAdov from Fergus County, Montana. The land was named Crescent B Ranch. In 1914, Edward Vose Babcock, a lumber baron and mayor of Pittsburgh (1918–1922), purchased the 91,000-acre (37,000 ha) land and it was renamed to Babock Ranch. The land's primary use was logging and agriculture, and those uses continue to generate funds for the maintenance and operation of the Babcock Ranch Preserve. The Babcock Ranch Preserve Act, enacted by the Florida Legislature in 2006, made it the first Florida preserve responsible for generating its funding under a public–private management partnership that includes the Florida Fish and Wildlife Conservation Commission and the Florida Forest Service.

Charlotte County established Babcock Ranch as a development of regional impact (DRI), as defined in Section 380.06 of the Florida Statutes, on April 4, 2006. The District was established on June 27, 2007, by the Florida legislature.

In 2009, Kitson & Partners, a real estate development firm, joined with Florida Power & Light (FPL) to announce plans to make Babcock Ranch the first solar-powered city in the United States. A large photovoltaic power station and a network of rooftop solar panels on commercial buildings, planned to be expanded over time, had been set up to send more renewable power into the Florida electrical grid than the city consumes.

=== State ownership ===
In the late 1990s, the Babcock family sought to sell the ranch to the state. The property was considered a priority for purchase by conservation leaders who saw it as the final section needed to establish an environmental corridor stretching from Lake Okeechobee in the center of Florida to the Charlotte Harbor Estuary on Florida's Gulf Coast.

The state offered $455 million for 91,000 acres (37,000 ha) in 2005, but negotiations broke down over the structure of the transaction and tax issues. A sale of the real estate would have triggered significant tax liabilities that could have been avoided if ownership had been transferred by selling all corporate stock. The state was barred from meeting the family's terms by a provision in the state constitution prohibiting the use of land acquisition funds to purchase a private company's stock.

Florida real estate development firm Kitson & Partners, led by former professional American football player Syd Kitson, signed a contract for the purchase of the Babcock Florida Company, including the ranch, in July 2005 and laid out a plan to sell over 74,000 acres (30,000 ha) to the state for the preservation of the most environmentally sensitive areas. The contract was contingent on a series of local and state approvals for development on the property to be retained by Kitson & Partners and a land management agreement that would provide for continued ranching operations and employment of the ranch staff under state ownership. Purchase from the family and sale of the preserve lands to the state and Lee County closed on July 31, 2006.

As part of the arrangement, Kitson & Partners received $350 million for the land, with approximately $310 million provided in the final budget of Governor Jeb Bush and $40 million from Lee County, Florida. According to Time, the purchase was the "largest preservation buy in Florida history".

== Development ==
The center of the planned urban development is about 10 miles (16 km) south-southwest of the former Babcock family home and barns. Plans for the proposed city of Babcock Ranch were developed through public participation in a series of meetings held in Charlotte County in early 2006 and were formally announced with the first application for development approvals.

The development plan consists of a total of 20,000 permanent jobs to sustain up to 50,000 residents in 19,000 households and 5,000,000 square feet (460,000 m^{2}) of light industry, retail, commerce, offices, and civic space. The downtown area was designed to be walkable and commutable by bike and include 8,000 homes with offices, business parks, a hospital care center, shopping, restaurants, entertainment, and lodges. Construction started in November 2015, with the ground breaking celebrated on Earth Day 2016.

All commercial buildings and homes in Babcock Ranch must be certified as energy-efficient and constructed according to Florida Green Building Coalition standards.

Florida Gulf Coast University plans to build a 125,000-square-foot (11,600 m^{2}) satellite campus in Babcock Ranch's MidTown. The university's 11th academic building will be dedicated to advancing sustainability and resiliency.

== Infrastructure ==
Babcock Ranch was planned to have an interconnected system of computer networks utilizing the IBM Rational Focal Point software (now Unicom Focal Point software) running all city services from transport to energy to communications, and also linking up to local businesses; Babcock Ranch will be added to IBM's list of the world's "smarter cities". According to Smart Planet, wireless Internet connectivity will cover the whole of Babcock Ranch city.

An on-site 75-megawatt solar photovoltaic array broke ground in 2016 by Florida Power & Light Company, which combined with a network of solar rooftop arrays on commercial buildings to generate more energy than the city consumes, Babcock Ranch is the first solar-powered city in the United States.

According to Florida Power & Light chief development officer Eric Silagy, the photovoltaic solar plant to be built at Babcock Ranch will occupy rooftops throughout the city plus 400 acres (160 ha) of land. Babcock Ranch's solar power plant will connect to the main grid so a consistent energy supply can be maintained by importing power on overcast days and exporting it on sunny days. The objective of using a solar generator to power the city is a reduction in carbon emissions and dependence on oil, and to lower energy bills for residents, aided by proposed "smart home" energy efficiency technology. Residents and businesses utilize smart grid technology to monitor and control their energy consumption.

In November 2023, Tampa General Hospital announced a partnership to expand into Babcock Ranch. TGH Urgent Care opened 2025 in a 6,500-square-foot facility open 7 days per week. Tampa General Medical Group (TGMG) opened in August 2026, providing primary care and an on-site laboratory.

The PKWY, a 313-acre linear park and greenway located in MidTown officially opened March 1, 2025. It consists of six separate themed facilities connected by a paved trail and walking paths. The parks are named Bluebird, Hillcrest, Explorers, Bark, Palmetto and the Lagoon.

For the 2025-26 school year, enrollment in Babcock Neighborhood School (BNS) was 1,053, which included BNS Elementary School (K-5), BNS Middle School (6-8) and Babcock High School (9-12).

== Nature preserve ==
Approximately ninety percent of Babcock Ranch's total land remained undeveloped, including more than half of the area owned by developers Kitson & Partners, to be preserved as open space, nature reserves, or for agricultural use. The Babcock Ranch Preserve, which includes land owned by the State of Florida and by Lee County, covers eighty percent of the ranch's original approximately 91,000 acres (37,000 ha). The preserve is self-funding, with all operations supported by revenue from the publicly owned working ranch, the first and only of its type in Florida. The preserve was managed by Kitson & Partners until 2016, when a non-profit entity with board members appointed by the state took over. The state plans to continue business enterprises to maintain the publicly owned land as a nature reserve with accommodations for recreation, including hunting, camping, and hiking.
