= John S. Herron =

American politician (1872–1947)

Mayor of Pittsburgh
- In office 1933–1934
- Preceded by: Charles H. Kline
- Succeeded by: William N. McNair

Personal details
- Born: November 7, 1872; Oswego, New York, U.S.
- Died: September 13, 1947 (aged 74); Pittsburgh, Pennsylvania, U.S.
- Resting place: Homewood Cemetery
- Political party: Republican
- Spouse: Corine Wagner (m. 1903)
- Children: 1
- Occupation: Bricklayer; politician

John S. Herron (November 7, 1872 – September 13, 1947), served as the 48th Mayor of Pittsburgh from 1933 to 1934. As of 2025, he remains the last Republican mayor of Pittsburgh.

== Early life ==
John S. Herron was born on November 7, 1872, in Oswego, New York, to Margaret (née Skinner) and Hugh H. Herron. His father worked as a composing room foreman at a newspaper. Herron attended public schools in Oswego. He was a newspaper boy in Oswego and at the age of 16 he became a bricklayer. He was a baseball player.

== Career ==
In 1901, Herron moved to Pittsburgh. He worked for contractors as a brick layer for a time in Canton, Ohio. He returned to Pittsburgh and continued as a brick layer. In Pittsburgh, he worked on the Frick Building, Bessemer Building, Farmers Bank Building, the Carnegie Library of Pittsburgh, Mercy Hospital, House Building, Iroquois Apartments, Manufacturers Building, the Oliver power house, and the train shed of the Wabash Pittsburgh Terminal. He was elected secretary of the Bricklayers Union No. 2 of Pennsylvania. He was president of the Bricklayer's Union and was a delegate to the national convention in Minneapolis. Mayor William A. Magee appointed Herron as city health director. In 1913, he became a member of the Pittsburgh city council as its labor representative. He served as president of the city council from 1930 to 1933. In April 1933, following the resignation of Charles H. Kline, he became mayor of Pittsburgh. He won the Republican nomination for the next mayoral election, but lost to Democratic nominee William N. McNair. During his term, the city adopted the repeal of the commonwealth's "Sunday Blue Laws" prohibiting business and sports for 24 hours. The repeal of the Blue Laws made it possible for the future Pittsburgh Steelers to join the National Football League.

In June 1934, Herron was appointed as a member of the board of visitors. Following the death of the commissioner-elect James F. Malone, Herron was elected county commissioner in December 1935 by judges of the Common Pleas Court. He was re-elected twice and was minority member of the board for three terms. Prior to his death, he won one of two Republican nomineess for the 1947 county commissioner election.

== Personal life ==
Herron married Corine Wagner in October 1903. They had one daughter, Margaret. He was a hiker. He lived on Hamilton Avenue in Pittsburgh. He was a member of Homewood Presbyterian Church.

Herron died on September 13, 1947, at Magee Hospital. He was buried in Homewood Cemetery.

Political offices
Preceded by Charles H. Kline	Mayor of Pittsburgh; 1933–1934	Succeeded by William N. McNair
