= Paul B. Riis =

Paul Benedict Riis (October 4, 1876 – March 27, 1944) was a Swiss-born American landscape architect and conservationist who played a formative role in early 20th-century park development in the Midwest and western Pennsylvania. Noted for his integration of naturalistic design principles and his advocacy for native materials, Riis is best remembered for his directorship in the creation of North Park and South Park in Allegheny County, Pennsylvania.

== Career in Illinois ==
Riis served as the original superintendent of the Rockford, Illinois park system from 1912 to 1927, where he helped shape the city's early park infrastructure and planning initiatives. During this time, he also held a national leadership role as director of the American Institute of Park Executives from 1923 to 1926 and contributed regularly to Parks and Recreation Magazine, editing and authoring its "Conservation of Wild Life" section for sixteen years.

== Allegheny County Parks ==
Parks are primarily intended to counteract the ill effects of city life, to gratify tired eyes and minds with the grace and beauty of nature; fill strangling lungs with pure, fragrant air of grasslands, forest and growing things; delight ringing ears with the soothing music of singing waters and the lyric carol of wild birds, that mind and nerves may relax and unbend, revive and refresh themselves and gather bodily strength, assurance and fortitude of soul.

— Paul B. Riis

In 1927, Allegheny County Commissioner Edward V. Babcock recruited Riis to lead a newly established county parks department. At Babcock's recommendation, Riis was appointed director of parks and given responsibility for the design and development of North and South Parks, the first two large-scale regional parks in Allegheny County.

Riis brought to the project an aesthetic philosophy inspired by Danish-born landscape architect Jens Jensen. Like Jensen, he favored the use of native species, natural materials, and designs that emphasized the organic beauty of the land. Under Riis's direction, both parks were shaped to provide what he called "Poetic Park Trails," a term that reflected his desire to integrate artistry and nature. Roads, bridle paths, stone shelters, golf courses, and water features were carefully placed to create a sense of harmony with the surrounding hills and woodlands.

In South Park, Riis oversaw the construction of prominent features such as the Corrigan Drive swimming pool, waterfalls, council rings, decorative pools and channels (the "Vale of Cashmere"), and numerous scenic walking trails. His work emphasized year-round use and accessibility, reflecting his belief that parks were a public necessity rather than a luxury.

== Departure and later work ==
Riis's tenure in Allegheny County lasted from 1927 to 1932. In October 1932, his employment was terminated by the county commissioners during a period of heightened scrutiny regarding county expenditures and operations. His name appeared in contemporaneous reporting related to a broader investigation into alleged inefficiencies and the use of county labor and materials in the parks department.

After his departure, Riis returned to the Midwest where he resumed private landscape work. One of his most notable post-county projects was the design of the Howard Colman estate in Rockford. He also collaborated with conservationist Aldo Leopold on early deer-browse studies, contributing to ecological research in the region.

== Personal life and legacy ==
Riis was a prolific photographer, author, and advocate for public recreation. He was known for hiking, bird watching, and cultivating irises.

He died at his home in Rockford, Illinois, on March 27, 1944, at the age of 67.

== Bibliography ==
- Riis, Paul B. (1928). Birds of the Mississippi Watershed.
