= Council of Three Rivers American Indian Center =

The Council of Three Rivers is a Pittsburgh, Pennsylvania Native American intertribal organization that was organized in the early 1970s. The organization owns land that is used for the site of an annual, intertribal pow-wow. The center also conducts meetings for its members. The Center remodeled former military structures to house their organization. The center assists its members with childcare, senior care and other forms of assistance. The site is maintained by Fred Deer who initiated its renovation in 1986. He is also a member of the advisory council of the Council of Three Rivers. Activities include the preservation of Native American art forms such as bone and wood carving, bead-work and pow-wows. The council's annual Pow-Wow hosts Native American artists, dancers, singers, and drummers from a variety of indigenous groups such as Cuban Taino and Alaskan Tlingit.
