= 1913 Uruguayan parliamentary election =

Parliamentary elections were held in Uruguay on 27 November 1913 to elect all members of the Chamber of Representatives.

== Electoral system ==
Suffrage was limited to literate men. Voting was not secret, as voters had to sign their ballot paper.

== Results ==
Party	Votes	%	Seats	+/–
Colorado Party	32,742	59.59	76	–9
National Party	14,792	26.92	17	New
Anti-Collegiate	5,269	9.59	0	New
Coalition	843	1.53	2	New
Socialist Party	793	1.44	0	–5
Civic Union	510	0.93	0	0
Total	54,949	100.00	95	+5
Source: Bottinelli et al.
