= William N. McNair =

American politician

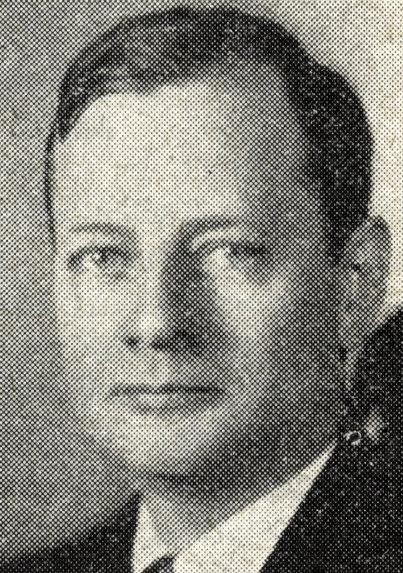

49th Mayor of Pittsburgh
- In office 1934–1936
- Preceded by: John S. Herron
- Succeeded by: Cornelius D. Scully

Personal details
- Born: November 7, 1880
- Died: September 13, 1948 (aged 67)
- Party: Democratic
- Education: University of Michigan Law School

William N. McNair (November 7, 1880 – September 13, 1948), served as the 49th mayor of Pittsburgh, Pennsylvania from 1934 to 1936.

== Early life ==
Originally from Middletown, Pennsylvania, McNair graduated from Gettysburg College in 1900, earned a law degree from the University of Michigan in 1903, and became an attorney in Pittsburgh in 1904. He tried his hand at politics several times, losing successive elections before finally winning office.

== Pittsburgh politics ==
At the city's highest office in 1934, it was soon apparent though why McNair had never won a public office before. McNair almost from the beginning had a confrontational relationship with City Council. At first much of his antics were viewed as the actions of a man that cared about the "little guy"; soon though much of his actions just ground the city's ability to govern to a halt in heated, endless and dramatic debate over the most nuanced issues. During his fractious leadership McNair even set up his office in the ornate lobby of the City-County Building to display his "independence" from council and the city bureaucracy.

He continued to be a lightning rod during his administration, being arrested at one point for refusing to return what a judge found to be an unlawful fine he had assessed a citizen. On November 27, 1935 Governor George Earle cut off funds to the city after continued difficulty dealing with McNair. Later when he received word that the governor was considering impeachment proceedings against him he installed a bed in the mayor's office and conducted press conferences from it. In 1936, he traveled to Washington, D.C., and took part in congressional hearings on taxes. His position of repealing all federal taxes at the time was voiced so zealously that a New York Times report recounts a Capitol Police Officer was called before McNair voluntarily left the hearing.

The most fateful event for his political career took the city by force on Saint Patrick's Day 1936 when it suffered from the worst flooding in its history. The event and the chaotic nature that McNair had plunged the city into sealed his fate. Political opponents accused him of impropriety in various dealings, and he was jailed for three days in April on charges of operating a numbers game.

He resigned on a whim on October 6, 1936, promptly rescinded his resignation then demanded to once again be sworn in as mayor, but by that time the city council and the rest of the city had grown tired of his controversial leadership, choosing instead to validate his earlier resignation and let Cornelius Scully assume the mayor's office.

== Later life ==
McNair became a sort of political sideshow after he left office, continuing to run for offices unsuccessfully and giving political speeches and rallies for various causes. He died in St. Louis, Missouri in 1948 during a political rally and is buried in Allegheny Cemetery in Pittsburgh.

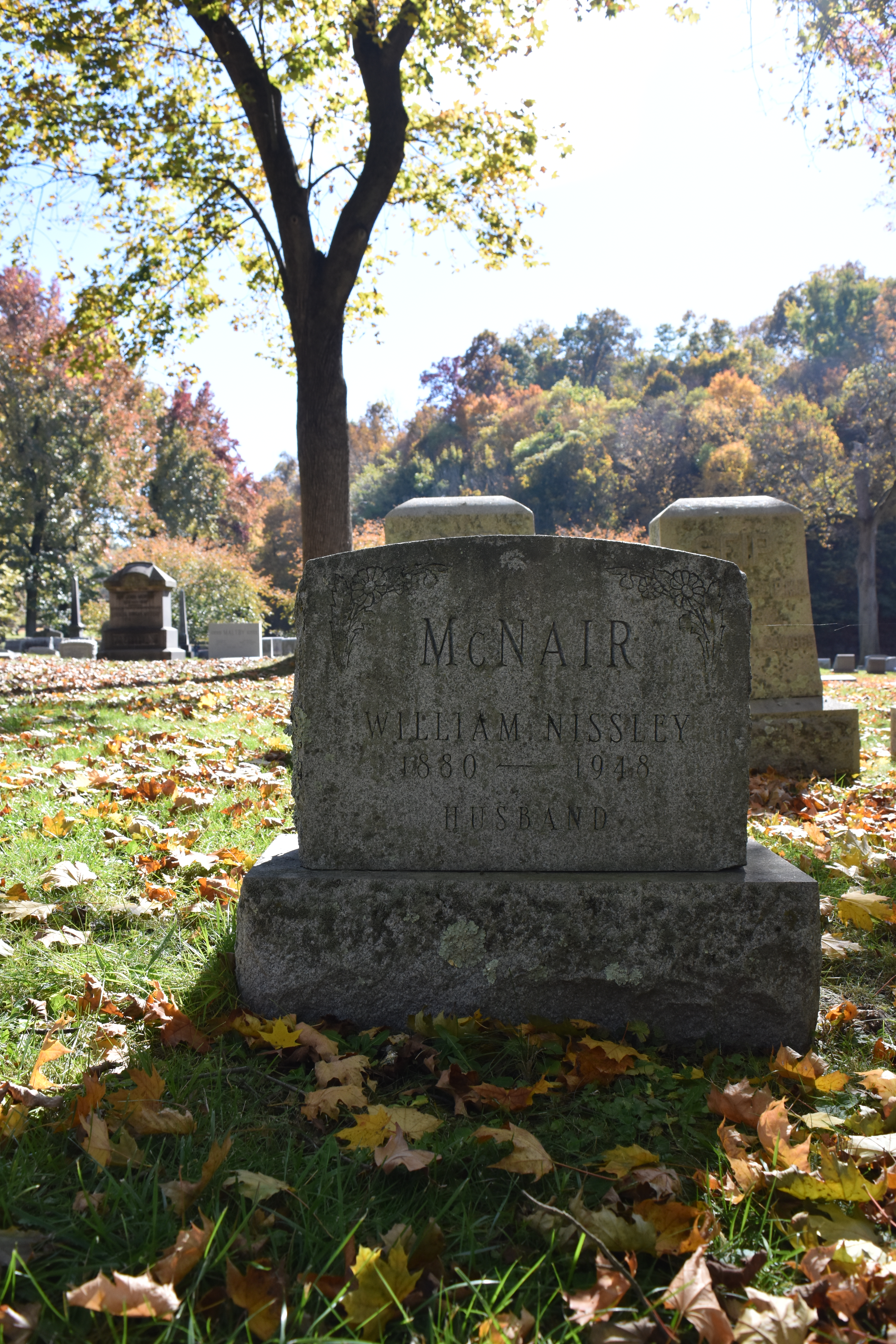
William McNair's grave in Allegheny Cemetery, Pittsburgh, PA. Taken October 23, 2022.

Political offices
Preceded by John Herron	Mayor of Pittsburgh; 1934–1936	Succeeded by Cornelius Scully
Party political offices
Preceded by Samuel Schull	Democratic nominee for U.S. Senator from Pennsylvania (Class 1); 1928	Succeeded by Joe Guffey
