= Edward V. Babcock =

American lumber industrialist (1864–1948)

45th Mayor of Pittsburgh
- In office January 7, 1918 – January 2, 1922
- Preceded by: Joseph G. Armstrong
- Succeeded by: William A. Magee

Personal details
- Born: Edward Vose Babcock; January 31, 1864
- Died: September 2, 1948 (aged 84)

Edward Vose Babcock (January 31, 1864 – September 2, 1948) was a lumber industrialist who served as Mayor of Pittsburgh from 1918 to 1922.

== Biography ==
=== Early life ===
Edward Vose Babcock entered the lumber business from an early age. He ran successfully for City Council in 1911 and began making a political name for himself.

=== Pittsburgh politics ===
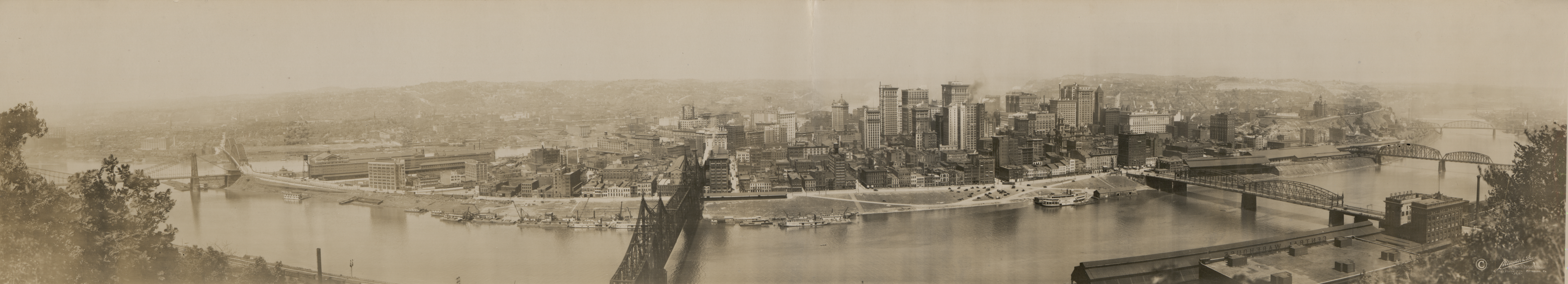
Pittsburgh in 1920

Unlike his predecessor "Joe the builder", Babcock's administration had little time to implement much policy, they were too busy dealing with the triple threat of a massive steel strike that created much social dissension and unrest, the 1918-1919 flu pandemic that hit Pittsburgh especially hard, all this while at the family dinner tables and company lunch rooms around the city the women's suffrage movement tested the strength of families and employers.

=== Creation of North and South Parks ===
In 1925, Babcock was elected Allegheny County Commissioner. Concerned about the rapid transformation of large areas of rural land into suburbs, Babcock wanted to set aside protected areas of land for recreation. To achieve this, he personally purchased two huge tracts of land, totaling around 4,000 acres. He sold the land to the county at cost to create North and South Parks. Although some were skeptical at first, the public quickly came to love the "people's country clubs," and the County soon acquired another 500 acres. North and South Parks provided the foundation for the county-wide system, which expanded to a total of nine parks and over 12,000 acres from 1958 to 1979.

Babcock hired Paul B. Riis, a nationally prominent landscape architect, as the first director of the new Allegheny County Bureau of Parks in 1927. Riis laid the groundwork for North and South Parks, including major landscaping and road systems. He was inspired by the "Prairie Style" of landscape architect Jens Jensen, which used native plants and materials to construct naturalistic landscapes.

The hallmark of Riis's design included familiar features of the Western Pennsylvania landscape. He used layered stones, a rich palette of native plants, and winding waterways to define the park's character and create spaces "suitable for human play." Riis worked for six years to develop the North Park Lake and Boathouse as the park's signature features as well as park roads, trails, picnic groves, sports fields, pool, and golf course.

In 1932, new County Commissioners hired architect Henry Hornbostel, who had designed many of Pittsburgh's greatest buildings, as Bureau of Parks director. Thanks to his leadership, North Park was completed during the Great Depression using New Deal programs. In 1933, he established a Civilian Conservation Corps camp in the park housing 200 men to carry out his plan.

=== Later life ===
In response to the suffrage movement, Babcock became the first mayor to appoint a woman to a cabinet-level position within the city.

After leaving the mayor's office Babcock continued his political career at the county level, becoming a commissioner in 1927. During his rule of Allegheny County he was successful in pushing through the opening of the Allegheny County Airport in West Mifflin, he also was instrumental in providing county help to the city for the opening of the triplet bridges (6th, 7th and 9th Street Bridges).

He was also extremely generous, purchasing at personal expense 4,000 acres (16 km^{2}) of land for the expansive "North Park" and "South Park" in the county. He retired in 1931 and died in 1948, being buried in Homewood Cemetery.

== Legacy ==
- Babcock Boulevard in the North Hills of Pittsburgh is named for him.
- Babcock State Park in West Virginia.
- Babcock Ranch and Babcock Preserve in Florida.
- The highly profitable Babcock Lumber and Boom Company, operating out of Davis, West Virginia from 1907, was responsible for devastating environmental damage to much of surrounding Tucker County, including Canaan Valley, Dolly Sods and the Blackwater Canyon. These areas were clear-cut and the landscape converted into a tinderbox by the residual slashings. By 1910, fires swept over the wasteland, often burning continuously from spring until the first snows. In 1914, with the county virtually denuded of standing trees, the ground burned continually for 6 months. When the fires subsided, thin mineral soil and bare rock were all that remained. Uncontrollable soil erosion and flooding further degraded and depopulated the region, which bears the scars of the conflagration to the present day.
- E.V.Babcock's residence at 5135 Ellsworth Ave in Pittsburgh's Shadyside neighborhood was first completed in 1900 for Pittsburgh steel and coal magnate William P. Snyder, and later bought by Babcock, hence termed "Babcock Mansion". It was said to have hosted at least 2 US presidents, Grace Kelly, Charles Lindbergh, and other celebrities. It was saved from demolition in 1975, and switched hands twice, and finally up for sale since about Jan 2020, and by Jun 2023, the sale price was over $2.8 million.

Political offices
Preceded by Joseph G. Armstrong	Mayor of Pittsburgh; 1918–1922	Succeeded by William A. Magee
