= Charles H. Kline =

American politician

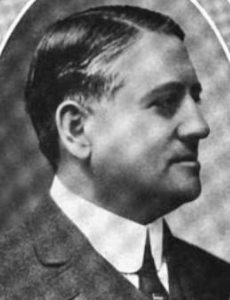

47th Mayor of Pittsburgh
- In office January 4, 1926 – March 31, 1933
- Preceded by: William A. Magee
- Succeeded by: John Herron

Member of the Pennsylvania State Senate
- In office 1906–1918

Member of the Pennsylvania House of Representatives
- In office 1904–1906

Personal details
- Born: Charles Howard Kline; December 25, 1870 Indiana County, Pennsylvania
- Died: July 22, 1933 (aged 62) Pittsburgh, Pennsylvania
- Resting place: Allegheny Cemetery
- Party: Republican
- Spouse: Katherine Whitesell Johnson (m. 1900)
- Education: University of Pennsylvania
- Occupation: Lawyer, politician

Charles Howard Kline (December 25, 1870 – July 22, 1933) served as the 47th Mayor of Pittsburgh from 1926 to 1933.

== Early life ==
Charles H. Kline was born in 1870 in Indiana County, Pennsylvania. He attended the University of Pennsylvania and became a lawyer in 1898. He married Katherine Whitesell Johnson in 1900.

Kline was elected to the Pennsylvania House of Representatives in 1904, and to the State Senate in 1907. He served three terms in the latter, and was the President pro tempore during the 1915 session. He was a judge in state courts from 1919 to 1925, and was elected Mayor of Pittsburgh in 1926.

== Pittsburgh politics ==
During Kline's administration the city was plunged into the national Great Depression. Despite these newfound hardships, Pittsburgh's corporate community continued to expand, adding several new skyscrapers to the region's horizon. Among these were the Gulf Oil Tower, Grant Building, and Koppers Tower. Kline is, to date, the last Republican to be elected Mayor of Pittsburgh.

Mayor Kline expanded the city's borders annexing the neighborhood of Carrick to the city's tax rolls. His administration ended on a bad note however, Kline was forced to fight charges of malfeasance and political wrongdoing regarding the purchase of an oriental rug.

He was indicted on 48 counts of malfeasance, and on conviction in 1932 ordered to resign and sentenced to six months imprisonment. He died at St. Francis Hospital in Pittsburgh on July 22, 1933. He was buried in Allegheny Cemetery.

== See also ==
- Eliza Kennedy Smith
- List of mayors of Pittsburgh

Political offices
Preceded by William A. Magee	Mayor of Pittsburgh; 1926–1933	Succeeded by John S. Herron
