= Joseph G. Armstrong =

American politician

Joseph Gray Armstrong
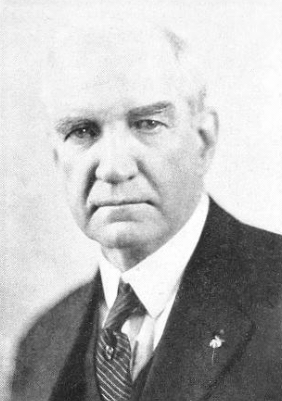

44th Mayor of Pittsburgh
- In office January 5, 1914 – January 5, 1918
- Preceded by: William A. Magee
- Succeeded by: Edward V. Babcock

Personal details
- Born: February 2, 1867; Pittsburgh, Pennsylvania, U.S.
- Died: November 19, 1931 (aged 64); Pittsburgh, Pennsylvania, U.S.
- Political party: Republican
- Spouse: Clara B. Smith

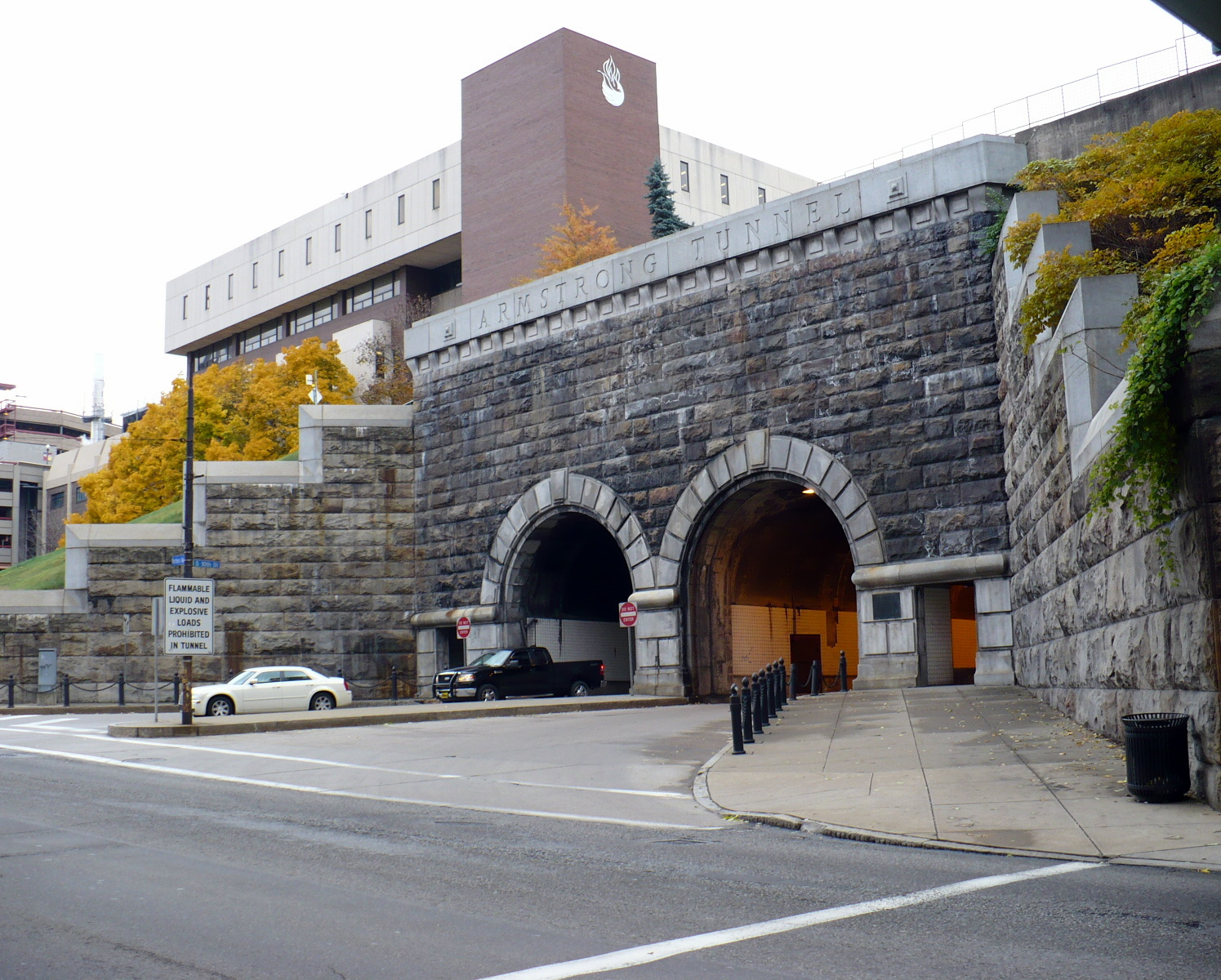
The Armstrong Tunnel

Joseph Gray Armstrong (1867–1931) was an American politician who served as Mayor of Pittsburgh from 1914 to 1918.

== Biography ==
Joseph G. Armstrong was born in Allegheny City, what is today the Northside neighborhood of the U.S. city of Pittsburgh. He became a glassmaker and eventually participated in the glass union and labor movement. From his labor connections he was elected to City Council and then ran successfully for County Coroner in 1904. He was coroner during the Pressed Steel Car Strike of 1909. He died of pneumonia in Pittsburgh on November 19, 1931, and is interred in South Side Cemetery, Pittsburgh.

== Pittsburgh politics ==
After being seated mayor in 1914, Armstrong went on an unprecedented building spree in the city, earning him the affectionate nickname "Joe the builder" among voters. His classical structures still grace the city today, including the massive 10 story City-County Building taking up an entire city block. His rule as mayor was also responsible for massive construction projects that are not so easily visible such as the Armstrong Tunnel which for the first time allowed easy access from the Grant & Liberty section of downtown to the Southside neighborhood under the steep hill that Duquesne University sits on in the Bluff neighborhood.

Political offices
Preceded by William A. Magee	Mayor of Pittsburgh; 1914–1918	Succeeded by Edward V. Babcock
