= William A. Magee =

American politician

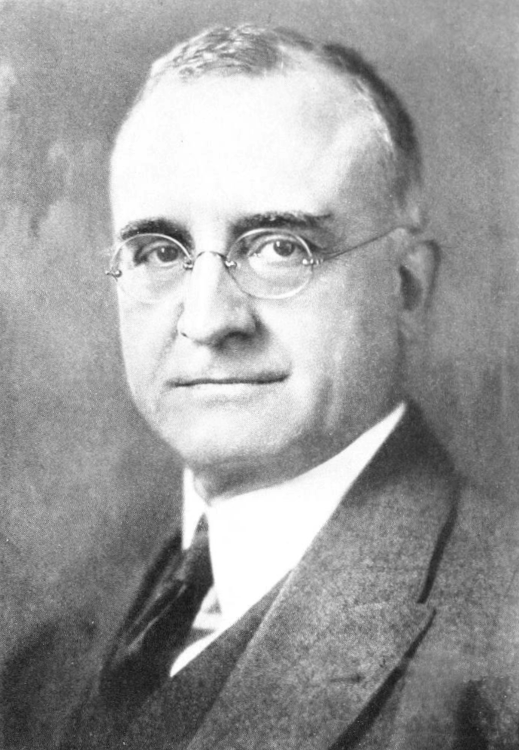

43rd and 46th Mayor of Pittsburgh
- In office January 2, 1922 – January 4, 1926
- Preceded by: Edward V. Babcock
- Succeeded by: Charles H. Kline
- In office April 5, 1909 – January 5, 1914
- Preceded by: George W. Guthrie
- Succeeded by: Joseph G. Armstrong

Member of the Pennsylvania State Senate
- In office 1901–1904

Personal details
- Born: William Addison Magee; May 4, 1873 Pittsburgh, Pennsylvania, U.S.
- Died: March 25, 1938 (aged 64) Pittsburgh, Pennsylvania, U.S.
- Party: Republican
- Education: Franklin and Marshall College
- Occupation: Lawyer, politician

William Addison Magee (May 4, 1873 – March 25, 1938) was born in Pittsburgh's Hill District neighborhood near the site of the former Mellon Arena. Before becoming mayor, he gained his reputation by serving as Assistant District Attorney for Allegheny County of which Pittsburgh is the county seat. He twice served as Mayor of Pittsburgh, from 1909 to 1914, and again from 1922 to 1926. He was a member of the Pennsylvania State Senate from 1901 to 1904.

== Pittsburgh politics ==
Magee oversaw several developments in the city, the most notable of which were the opening of the first National League concrete baseball park Forbes Field in the city's Oakland neighborhood. To top that achievement the Pittsburgh Pirates won their first World Series in their first season in the park.

On policy the Magee administration instituted a motorized police force for the first time in the city. He also oversaw the local institution of the national prohibition laws during his second term in office. He was the first man to serve the new expanded four-year term for the Mayor's office.

He died at Western Pennsylvania Hospital in Pittsburgh on March 25, 1938.

== Legacy and popular culture ==
Magee and the Magee political family, including Magee's uncle, Christopher Lyman Magee, are the namesake of both Magee-Women's Hospital and Magee Street in the city.

Magee was featured in the 1924 film Fording the Lincoln Highway.

Magee also wrote an informative article about what he considered to be the inefficiencies of city government. Magee wrote that city governments should be more centralized and focused to be effective.

== See also ==
- List of mayors of Pittsburgh

Political offices
Preceded by George W. Guthrie	Mayor of Pittsburgh; 1909–1914	Succeeded by Joseph G. Armstrong
Preceded by Edward V. Babcock	Mayor of Pittsburgh; 1922–1926	Succeeded by Charles H. Kline
