= Federal Reserve Bank of Chicago Detroit Branch =

Current bank in Detroit, Michigan, US

Agency overview
- Formed: 1927
- Jurisdiction: Seventh Federal Reserve District
- Headquarters: 1600 East Warren Avenue; Detroit, Michigan
- Parent agency: Federal Reserve Bank of Chicago

The Federal Reserve Bank of Chicago Detroit Branch Office is the only branch office of the Federal Reserve Bank of Chicago. It is part of the 7th district and its code is 7-G. It is currently located at 1600 East Warren Avenue, near I-75 in Detroit's Eastern Market Historic District. The office occupies 17 acres (6.9 ha) and cost $80 million to build. The Detroit branch was founded in 1927 and is currently headed by Robert Wiley. Each branch of the Federal Reserve Banks has a board of either seven or five directors, a majority of whom are appointed by the parent Federal Reserve Bank; the others are appointed by the Board of Governors. Branch directors serve staggered three-year terms (two-year terms if the Branch has five directors). One of the members appointed by the Federal Reserve Board is designated annually as chairman of the board of that Branch in a manner prescribed by the parent Federal Reserve Bank.

== Current board of directors ==
The following people are on the board of directors as of April 2019:

=== Appointed by the Federal Reserve Bank ===
Appointed by the Federal Reserve Bank
Name	Title	Term Expires
Michael L. Seneski	Chief Financial Officer; Credibly; Troy, Michigan	2019
Sandra E. Pierce	Chairman & Senior Executive Vice President, Private Client Group and Regional Banking Director; Huntington Michigan; Southfield, Michigan	2020
Sandy K. Baruah	President and Chief Executive Officer; Detroit Regional Chamber; Detroit, Michigan	2020
Rip Rapson	President and Chief Executive Officer; The Kresge Foundation; Troy, Michigan	2021

=== Appointed by the Board of Governors ===
Appointed by the Board of Governors
Name	Title	Term Expires
Linda P. Hubbard	President and Chief Operating Officer; Carhartt, Inc. Dearborn, Michigan	2019
Joseph B. Anderson Jr. (chair)	Chairman and Chief Executive Officer; TAG Holdings, LLC; Wixom, Michigan	2020
James M. Nicholson	Co-Chairman; PVS Chemicals, Inc. Detroit, Michigan	2021

== Historic building ==
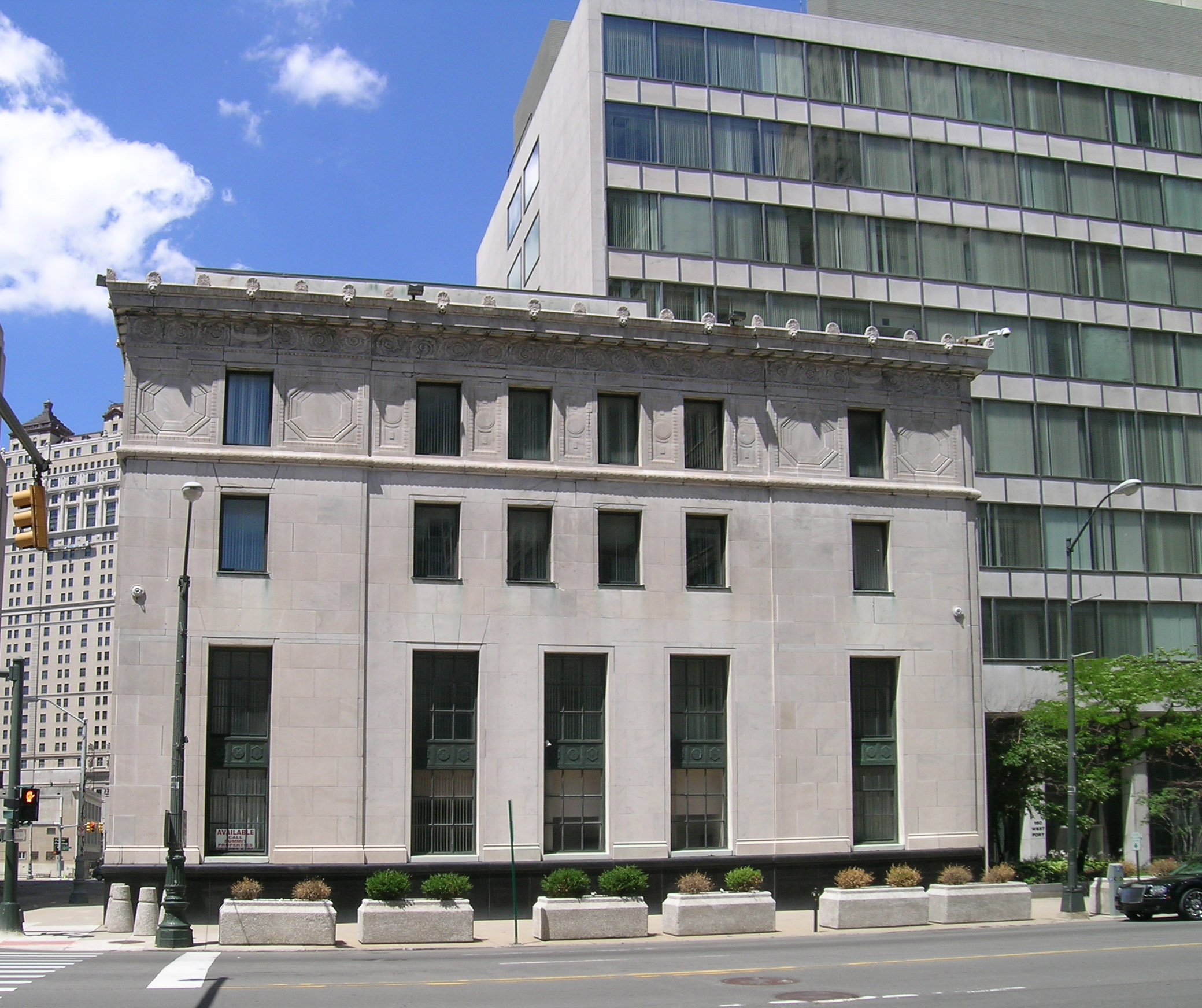
Federal Reserve Bank of Chicago Detroit Branch Historic Building

The Federal Reserve Bank of Chicago Detroit Branch Building is a bank building located at 160 W. Fort Street in Detroit, Michigan. The building was constructed in 1927 in a Classical Revival style. In 1951, the bank added an eight-story glass-and-marble annex, designed by Minoru Yamasaki. The Modern annex is clearly designed not to mimic the original building, but to make a statement all its own.

In 2004, the Federal Reserve Bank moved to its new building on Warren Avenue, leaving the building on Fort empty. A developer purchased the building with the intention of creating loft space.

In July 2011, Quicken Loans representatives were visiting the building, leading to speculation that Dan Gilbert would purchase the space. Gilbert announced the purchase on January 30, 2012.

In February 2014, the Detroit Media Partnership, parent of the Detroit Free Press and The Detroit News, announced all three organizations would occupy six floors in both the old and new sections of the building. The partnership anticipated completing the move before September and expected to place a sign on the exterior.

== Money Smart Week ==
The Detroit Branch currently coordinates the annual Michigan Money Smart Week. Coordinated by the Detroit Branch, partner organizations and the Money Smart Advisory Council (MAC), Money Smart Week is designed to promote financial literacy and provide greater personal finance education to consumers. It provides free events which are designed to provide financial education to consumers. The events are overseen by the Money Smart Advisory Council (MAC). The main event is a gathering of several hundred educators at the Detroit Branch office where they receive educational material from various sponsors. Overall, more than 100 sponsors participate in 200 events.

== See also ==
- Federal Reserve Act
- Federal Reserve System
- Federal Reserve Districts
- Federal Reserve Branches
- Federal Reserve Bank of Chicago
- Federal Reserve Bank of Chicago Detroit Branch Building
