= Detroit Media Partnership =

Newspaper company based in Detroit, United States

Detroit Media Partnership, L.P.
- Trade name: Michigan.com (2014–2025)
- Formerly: Detroit Newspaper Agency (1989–2005); Detroit Newspaper Partnership (2005–2007)
- Type: Private
- Industry: Media
- Founded: November 27, 1989; 36 years ago
- Defunct: December 28, 2025; 8 months ago
- Headquarters: Detroit, Michigan, U.S.
- Key people: Timothy Gruber (president, CEO)
- Products: Newspapers; News websites
- Owner: USA Today Co. (95%); MediaNews Group (5%)
- Website: detroitmedia.com

The Detroit Media Partnership was a joint venture which managed the Detroit Free Press and The Detroit News, the two primary daily newspapers in Detroit, Michigan, under a joint operating agreement from 1989 to 2025. It handled the production, advertising, circulation, and other business operations of both publications, though their newsrooms and editorial departments remained separate.

At the time of its dissolution in December 2025, the Detroit Media Partnership was primarily owned and managed by Gannett (now USA Today Co.), owner of the Free Press, with Detroit News owner MediaNews Group owning a minority stake. Only a month after the dissolution, USA Today Co. announced that it would acquire The Detroit News outright.

== History ==
=== Background ===
In 1986, The Detroit News and the Detroit Free Press, longtime rival daily newspapers in Detroit, Michigan, announced plans to enter into a joint operating agreement and merge their operations. At the time, The Detroit News, recently purchased by Gannett, was the larger and more successful of the two newspapers, with an average daily circulation of 645,000; the Free Press, owned by Knight-Ridder, had a slightly smaller circulation of 634,000. Both publications were losing money in the 1980s, though the Free Press dealt with greater financial losses.

The joint operating agreement was intended to preserve the distinct editorial positions of the two papers: historically, the Free Press was generally considered editorially liberal, while The Detroit News was regarded as more conservative.

==== Antitrust case ====
The proposed operational merger of Detroit's two dominant newspapers was the subject of antitrust concerns. Under the Newspaper Preservation Act of 1970, newspapers seeking to form joint operating agreements could be granted exemptions from federal antitrust law if it could be proven that one of the newspapers involved was otherwise likely to fail. In a July 1986 report, the U.S. Department of Justice's Antitrust Division recommended to Attorney General Edwin Meese that hearings on the proposed agreement be held before an administrative law judge. Hearings were held in 1987. Ernst & Whinney audited the Free Press's finances, concluding that it was unlikely to become profitable independently. Unions representing workers at both publications opposed the agreement, as did then-Detroit mayor Coleman Young.

Meese granted the exemption in August 1988, believing that Knight-Ridder would close the Free Press if he did not. Shortly after Meese approved the agreement, a group of newspaper readers and advertisers sued his successor, Dick Thornburgh, seeking an injunction, and asserting that neither paper qualified for the antitrust exemption. An appeals court upheld Meese's decision in January 1989, as did a 4-4 tie vote of the Supreme Court on November 13, 1989.

=== Joint operations ===
Following the Supreme Court decision, the newspapers entered into the agreement, combining their business operations into the Detroit Newspaper Agency on November 27, 1989. Under the terms of the initial agreement, Gannett and Knight-Ridder retained ownership of their respective newspapers, and split the Agency's profits. Gannett controlled three of the five seats on the Detroit Newspaper Agency's board of directors, though Knight-Ridder retained veto power over certain decisions.

The two papers began to publish joint Saturday and Sunday editions under the name The Detroit News and Free Press in December 1989, alternating responsibility for individual sections of the paper.

In 1989, the Detroit Free Press was the 10th-highest-circulation paper in the United States, and the combined Detroit News and Free Press was the country's fourth-largest Sunday paper.

==== Strike ====
From July 1995 to February 1997, unionized staffers of the Detroit Newspaper Agency went on a prolonged strike. The New York Times described the strike as "the last great newspaper strike of the 20th century."

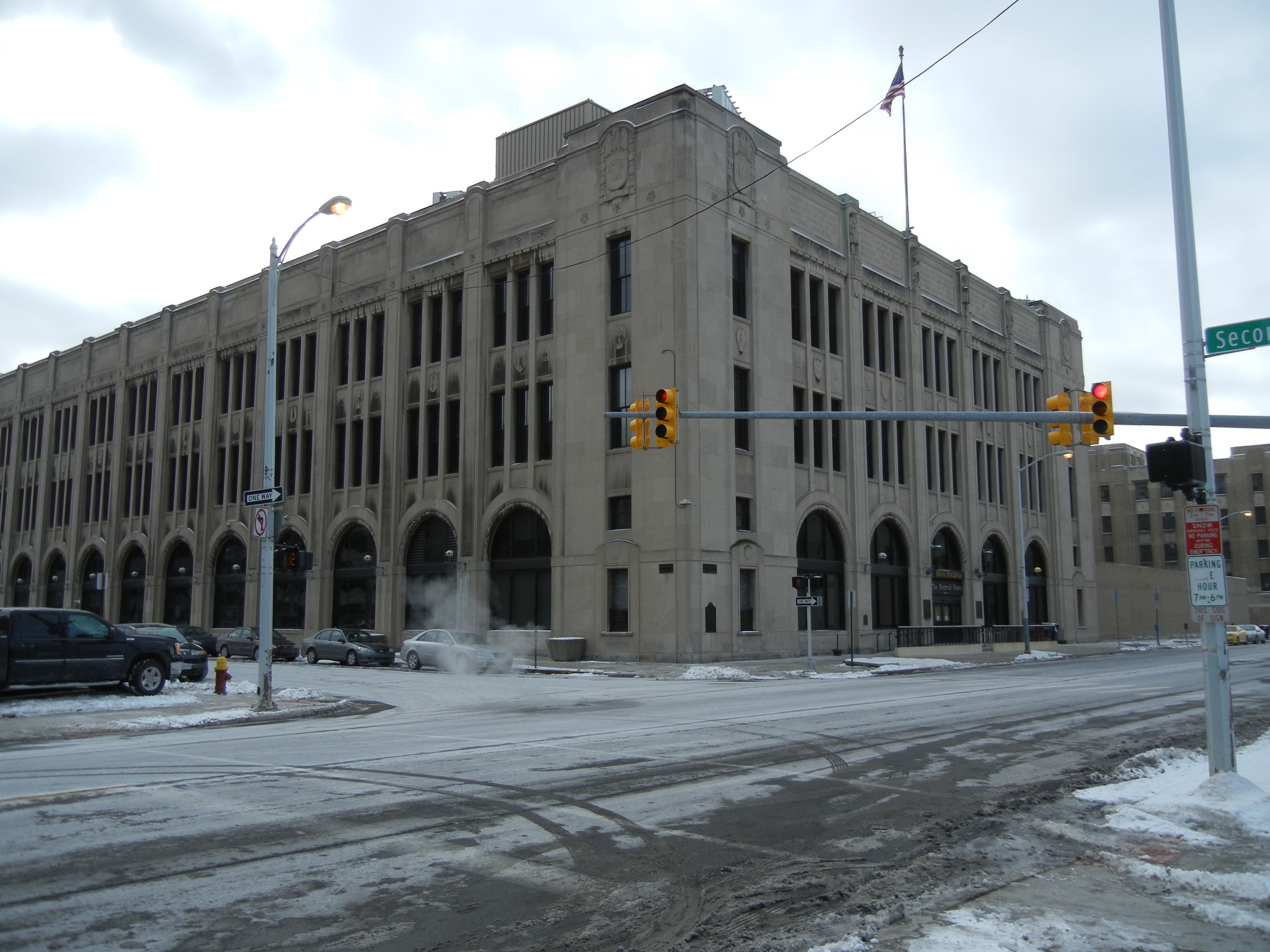
The Detroit News Complex, which housed both newspapers' offices from 1998 to 2014

In 1998, the Free Press closed its offices in the Detroit Free Press Building and moved into the Detroit News Complex.

=== Restructuring and Gannett ownership ===
On August 3, 2005, Gannett acquired the Free Press from Knight Ridder for $262 million, and sold the Detroit News to MediaNews Group for $25 million. Gannett also purchased Knight Ridder's ownership stake in the Detroit Newspaper Agency, which was restructured and renamed Detroit Newspaper Partnership, LP. Gannett retained a 95% ownership stake and operational control as the primary partner. With the restructuring of the partnership, the joint operating agreement was renewed through 2025.

Under the restructured partnership, The Detroit News became a morning newspaper. The joint Detroit News and Free Press on weekends was discontinued on April 30, 2006. Beginning in May 2006, the two newspapers began to publish independent Saturday editions, while the Free Press took over the Sunday edition entirely, producing the Sunday Free Press with a page of featured editorial content from The Detroit News.

The joint venture was renamed Detroit Media Partnership in April 2007.

In March 2009, the Detroit Media Partnership scaled back its daily home delivery of both publications to three days per week, eliminating delivery of the Monday, Tuesday, Wednesday, and Saturday print editions. Dave Hunke, then-CEO of the partnership, stated that more than 80% of its advertising revenue was sourced from the Thursday, Friday, and Sunday editions.

Until 2009, the Detroit Media Partnership also served as the local distributor of The New York Times, The Wall Street Journal, USA Today, Investor's Business Daily, and Financial Times.

In July 2010, Gannett introduced the website Michigan.com, which aggregated news from the Detroit News and the Free Press, along with other Gannett newspapers in Michigan, such as the Lansing State Journal. The Detroit Media Partnership adopted the Michigan.com brand for business-to-business marketing in October 2014.

In October 2014, the offices of both newspapers and the Partnership moved from the Detroit News Complex, which the Detroit News had occupied since 1917, to the then-newly reopened former Federal Reserve Bank of Chicago Detroit Branch Building. The Detroit News Complex was sold to Bedrock Real Estate, the former Federal Reserve building's owner.

=== Separation ===
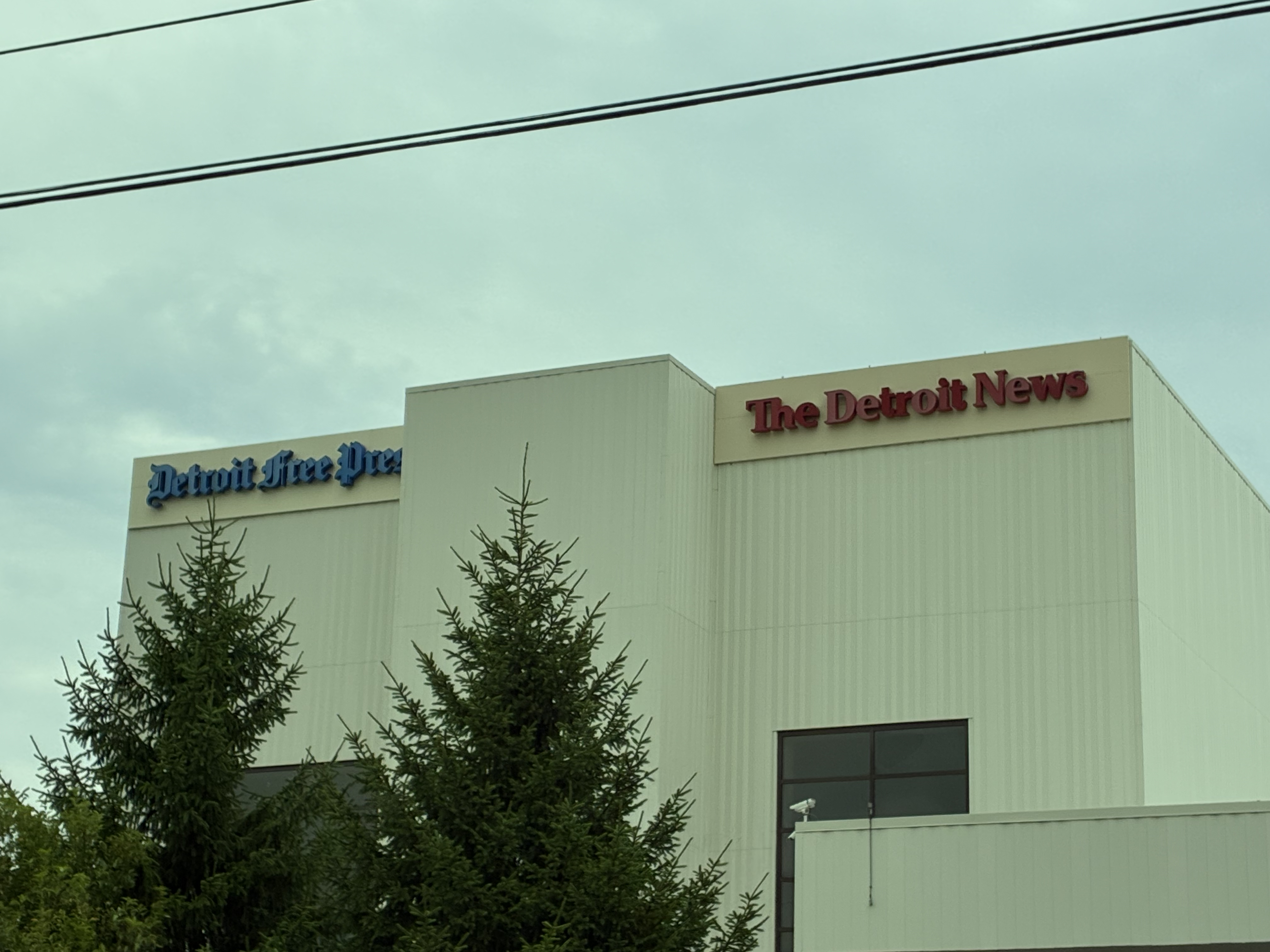
Detroit Free Press and The Detroit News signages, later removed

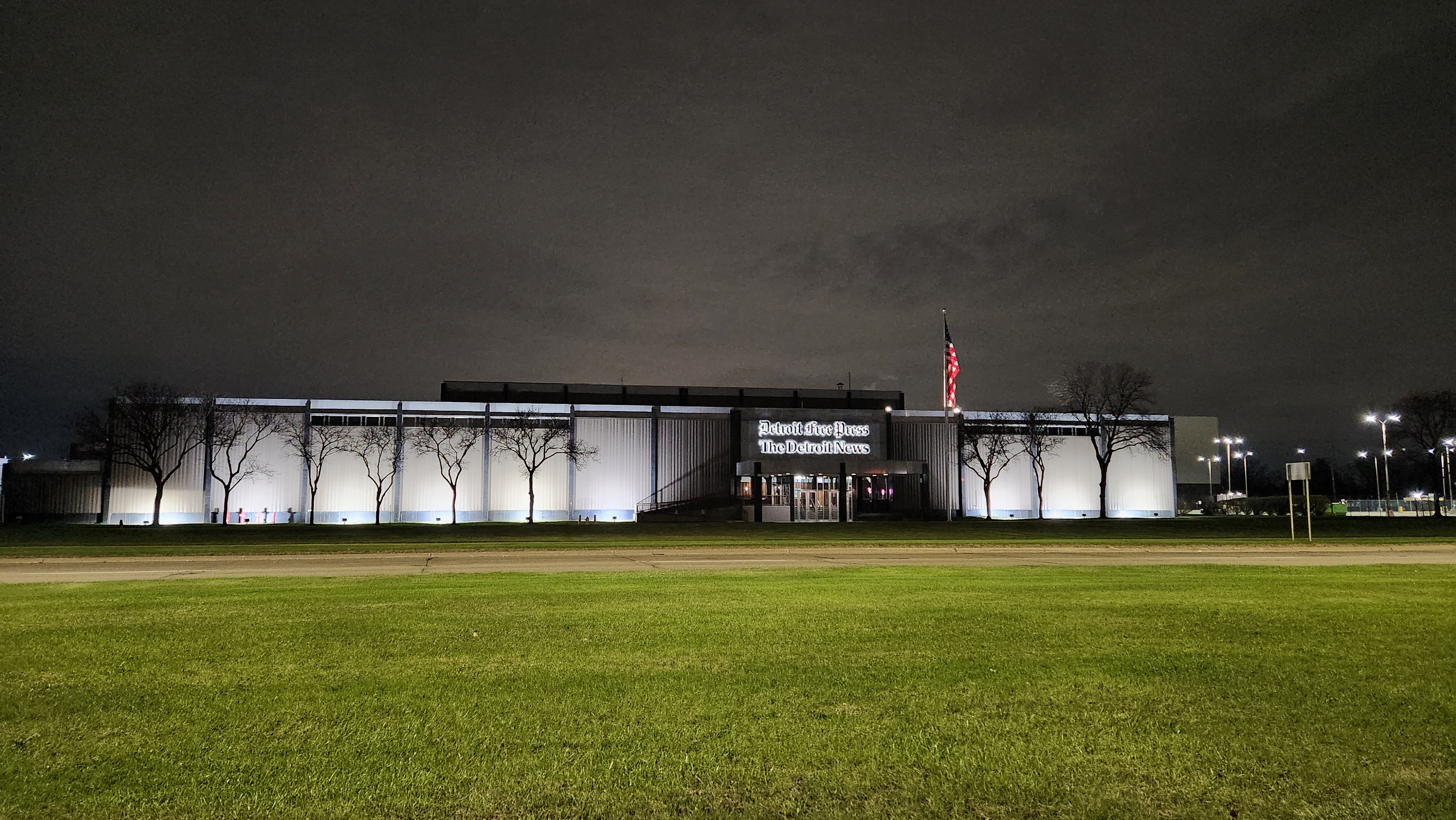
Joint printing plant in Sterling Heights, Michigan, closed in 2025

Gannett sold the partnership's printing plant in the Detroit suburb of Sterling Heights in 2023, and announced in January 2025 that it would close. The plant, which was opened by The Detroit News in 1975, printed 32 newspapers at the time of its closure. It closed on August 3, 2025, resulting in layoffs of more than 100 employees. Beginning with the August 5, 2025 editions of the Detroit News and Free Press, both have been printed at a Gannett plant in Canton, Ohio.

The two papers' newsrooms separately moved out of the Federal Reserve Building in December 2024: the Free Press moved to a nearby WeWork coworking space, and the News relocated to an office in the New Center district.

In June 2025, both newspapers announced that the joint operating agreement would not be renewed, and that the two would separate following the publication of the December 28, 2025 issue of the Free Press, dissolving the Detroit Media Partnership.

Following the dissolution, The Detroit News and the Detroit Free Press began to directly compete, as they did prior to the agreement. MediaNews Group planned to fully assume its operations by the end of January, introducing a Sunday edition on January 18, 2026, and a redesigned print edition and website. It was expected to move printing to the Chicago Tribune's plant in Illinois, and collaborate with other MediaNews Group-owned publications in the Detroit area such as The Oakland Press and Macomb Daily.

The joint operating agreement between The Detroit News and the Free Press was the first in U.S. history in which both partners survived in print form and voluntarily chose to exit; in almost all other such partnerships, one of the partnering newspapers folded or ceased print publication. According to experts interviewed by those publications, the joint operating agreement was successful in preserving the two publications and their distinct editorial voices, and as a result of the agreement, Detroit remains one of the last large cities in the U.S. with two major newspapers of similar size and prominence.

In mid-January, the new Sunday edition of the News was delayed indefinitely. On January 26, 2026, MediaNews Group announced that it would sell The Detroit News to USA Today Co., putting both papers under common ownership.
