= Detroit News Complex =

- U.S. National Register of Historic Places
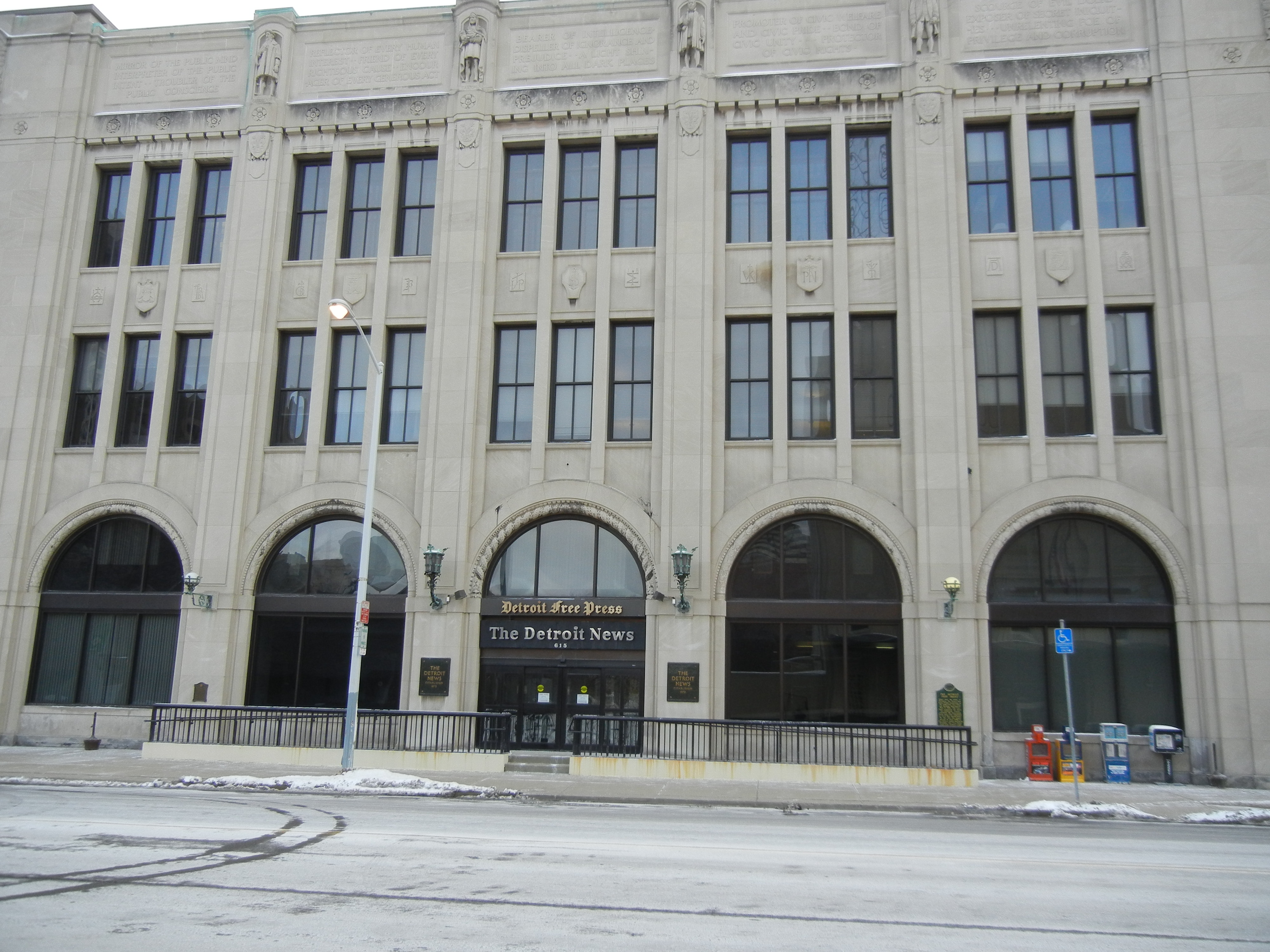
- Interactive map
- Location: 615 and 801 W. Lafayette Blvd. Detroit, Michigan
- Coordinates: 42°19′42.4″N 83°3′17.7″W
- Built: 1915
- Architect: Albert Kahn
- Architectural style: Commercial, Art Deco
- NRHP reference No.: 15000947
- Added to NRHP: December 29, 2015

The Detroit News Complex consists of two buildings: a historic office building at 615 West Lafayette Boulevard in Detroit, Michigan, and an associated parking structure, located across the street at 901 West Lafayette. The two buildings were listed on the National Register of Historic Places in 2015. The main building held the offices of The Detroit News until 2013, and was also the site of the first commercial radio broadcast (on WWJ) in the United States.

== History ==
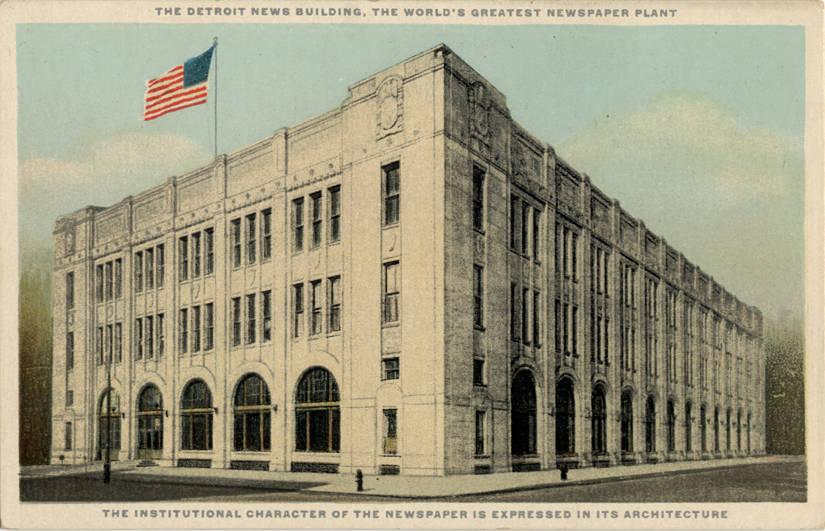
Detroit News Building, circa 1910s

The Detroit News was founded in 1873 by James E. Scripps, who controlled the paper until his death in 1906. He was succeeded by his son-in-law George Gough Booth. The paper's circulation grew rapidly in the 20th century, with over 100,000 in 1906 and over 225,000 in 1918. Booth, foreseeing this growth, planned to expand the paper's offices then on Shelby Street. However, the paper's growth exceeded the constraints of the space, and in 1913 the News acquired this block on Lafayette for $250,000. The site at the time included the 1858 home of Zachariah Chandler, a remnant of when the area had been a fashionable residential district.

Booth hired architect Albert Kahn to design the new building. The two men worked together on the design, with Booth detailing his vision of a grand, civic-minded refinement of the essentially industrial nature of the building. Ground was broken at the site in November 1915, and construction was completed by October 1917 at a cost of $2,000,000. Additions to the structure were made almost immediately: in 1918 a paper storage warehouse, also designed by Kahn, was added, and in 1920–21 a sixth floor was added to the original building. In 1924, a parking garage across Third Avenue was constructed, containing retail shops and a full-service garage in addition to parking spaces. In 1920, radio station WWJ began broadcasting from the building. WWJ was the first commercial radio broadcaster in the United States.

The Detroit News Building remained the home of The Detroit News for nearly a century. However, fortunes of the newspaper industry declined, particularly in Detroit. In 1998, as part of the Joint Operation Agreement between the News and the Detroit Free Press, Free Press staff moved into the building, vacating the Detroit Free Press Building. In 2014, the Free Press and News staff moved operations to leased space in the former Federal Reserve Bank of Chicago Detroit Branch Building, and the Detroit News Building was sold to Bedrock Real Estate, a branch of Quicken Loans.

== Description ==
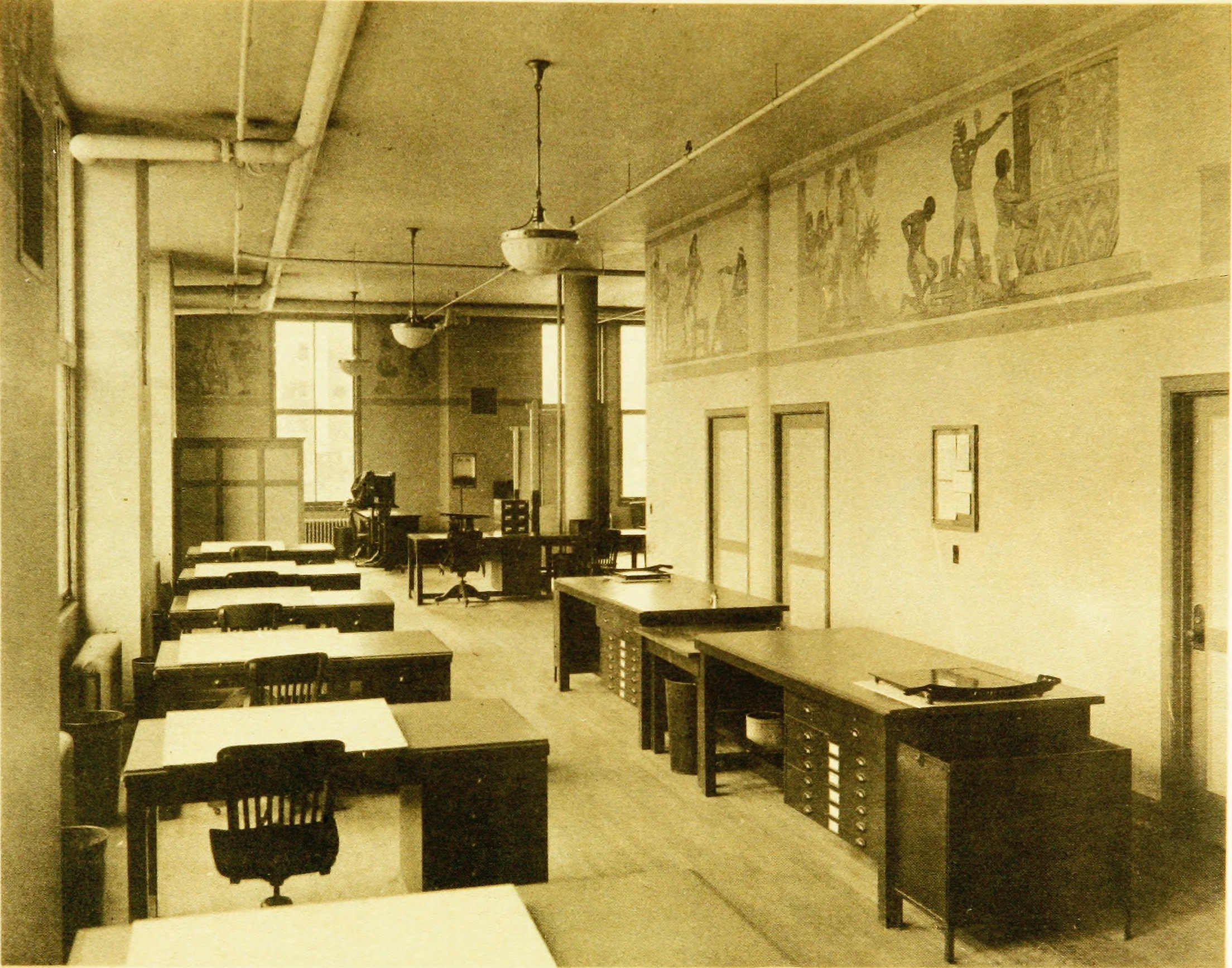
The art department featured murals painted by department employees

The Detroit News complex consists of two buildings constructed in 1915–1924: the Detroit News Building and the associated Parking Garage.

=== Detroit News Building ===
The Detroit News Building consists of three components covering an entire city block. The main section, constructed in 1915–17, occupies the east half of the block. It is a six-story, commercial-style building, constructed with a steel frame and reinforced concrete clad in limestone. Adjoining this building is the 1918–19 Paper Storage Warehouse addition. Single story additions built in 1921 and 1924 fill the remaining portion of the block. The three street-facing sides of the building are faced in buff Indiana Limestone atop a low gray granite base. The facades between the outer bays feature arches at ground level, separated by raised piers rising to the fifth floor.

=== Parking Garage ===
The 200-space parking garage was constructed across Third Avenue from the News Building in 1924. The structure is a five-story building with rooftop parking, constructed with a steel-frame and reinforced concrete. The facade is constructed in Art Deco style, using the same buff-colored brick and limestone trim materials as the Warehouse addition. The parking garage's front on Third is visually dominated by a central tower with projecting corner bays.
