= Geoffrey J. D. Hewings =

British-American regional scientist and economist

Geoffrey J.D. Hewings
- Education: University of Washington; University of Birmingham
- Scientific career
- Fields: Regional economics
- Workplaces: University of Illinois Urbana-Champaign

Geoffrey J.D. Hewings is an emeritus professor of geography, regional science, economics, and urban and regional planning at the University of Illinois at Urbana-Champaign, United States. He is the director of the Regional Economics Applications Laboratory. His research focuses on regional economic modeling, using input–output analysis and general equilibrium approaches.

== Early life and education ==
Geoffrey Hewings received his undergraduate degree from the University of Birmingham. He later moved to the United States to pursue graduate studies at the University of Washington, where he earned both his MA and PhD. Before his appointment at the University of Illinois, he held academic positions at the University of Kent in the United Kingdom and the University of Toronto in Canada.

== Academic career ==
Hewings joined the faculty of the University of Illinois at Urbana–Champaign in 1974. He was promoted to full professor in 1983 and became head of the department of geography. Over the course of his career, he also held joint appointments in the departments of economics and urban and regional planning, and later transferred part of his appointment to the Institute of Government and Public Affairs at Illinois.

== Regional Economics Applications Laboratory ==
In 1989, Hewings set up the Regional Economics Applications Laboratory (REAL) with Philip Israilevich of the Federal Reserve Bank of Chicago. REAL was established as a cooperative venture between the Federal Reserve Bank of Chicago and the University of Illinois and operated in this form until 2004.

REAL specializes in the development of comprehensive state and metropolitan economic models integrating econometric, input–output, and forecasting techniques. While its primary empirical focus has been on the economies of the Midwestern United States, REAL has contributed to model development for regions along the U.S. East Coast and internationally, including projects in Brazil and the Jakarta metropolitan region. The laboratory is a training center for doctoral students and visiting scholars in economics, geography, urban and regional planning, computer science, and mathematics.

== Research ==
Hewings's research focuses on regional economic modeling, using input–output analysis and general equilibrium approaches.

== Professional service and honors ==
Hewings has been president, director, and secretary of the Regional Science Association International (RSAI). He has been elected a fellow of RSAI, of the International Input-Output Association, and of the Western Regional Science Association. In 2007, he also served as the 48th President of the Western Regional Science Association. In 2020, he received the RSAI Founder's Medal in recognition of his contributions to regional science.

In recognition of his academic contributions and mentorship of early-career scholars, the North American Regional Science Council presents the Geoffrey J. D. Hewings Award to a recent doctoral graduate who has made distinguished contributions to regional science research.

== Selected works ==
- Kalyviotis, Nikolaos; Kallioras, Dimitris; von Behren, Sascha; Rogers, Chris D. F.; Hewings, Geoffrey J. D. (2026). "A Framework for Value-Integrated Infrastructure Business Models". Sustainability. 18 (17). doi:10.3390/su18179062.
- Kalyviotis, Nikolaos; Rogers, Chris D. F.; Hewings, Geoffrey J. D. (2025). "The economic value of transport infrastructure in the UK: an input–output analysis". Proceedings of the Institution of Civil Engineers - Engineering Sustainability. 178 (5): 369–381. arXiv:2504.15306. doi:10.1680/jensu.24.00015.
- Kalyviotis, Nikolaos; Rogers, Chris D. F.; Hewings, Geoffrey J. D. (2025). "The environmental value of transport infrastructure in the UK: an EXIOBASE analysis". Proceedings of the Institution of Civil Engineers - Engineering Sustainability. 178 (5): 382–399. arXiv:2504.20098. doi:10.1680/jensu.24.00023.
- Geoffrey Hewings, Michael Sonis, David E. Boyce (eds.): Trade, Networks and Hierarchies: Modeling Regional Interregional Economies [Advances in Spatial Science] (Springer Verlag, 2002)
- Joaquim J. M. Guilhoto, Geoffrey J. D. Hewings (eds.): Structure and Structural Change in the Brazilian Economy (Ashgate Publishing Company, 2001)
- Geoffrey Hewings, Michael Sonis, Moss Madden (eds.): Understanding and Interpreting Economic Structure [Advances in Spatial Science] (Springer Verlag, 1999)
- Moss Madden, Geoffrey J. Hewings (eds.): Social and Demographic Accounting (Cambridge University Press, 1995)
- Geoffrey J.D. Hewings and Moss Madden (eds.): Social and Demographic Accounting [Collection of original articles in honor of the 1984 Nobel Laureate in Economics] (Cambridge University Press, 1995)
- John J. Ll. Dewhurst, Geoffrey J.D. Hewings and Rodney C. Jensen (eds.): Regional Input-Output Modelling: New Developments and Interpretations (Avebury, 1991)
- Isao Orishimo, Geoffrey J.D. Hewings, Peter Nijkamp (eds.): Information Technology: Social and Spatial Perspectives: Proceedings [Lecture Notes in Economics and Mathematical Systems, Vol 315] (Springer Verlag, 1988)
- Geoffrey J.D. Hewings: Regional Input-Output Analysis [Scientific Geography Series, Vol 6] (Sage Publications, 1986)
- John Rees, Geoffrey J.D. Hewings, and Howard A. Stafford (eds.): Industrial Location and Regional Systems (Greenwood Publishing Group, 1981)
- Geoffrey J.D. Hewings: Regional Industrial Analysis and Development (Palgrave, 1977)
- Ricardo Gazel, Geoffrey J.D. Hewings and Michael Sonis, "Trade, sensitivity and feedbacks: interregional impacts of the US-Canada Free Trade Agreement," in J.C.J.M. van den Bergh, P. Nijkamp and P. Rietveld (eds) Recent Advances in Spatial Equilibrium Modeling (Springer-Verlag, 1996)
- Geoffrey J.D. Hewings and Ramamohan Mahidhara, "Economic impacts: lost income, ripple effects and recovery," in S. Changnon (ed.) The Great Flood of 1993, (Westview Press, 1996)
- Michael Sonis, Jiemin Guo and Geoffrey J.D. Hewings, "Comparative analysis of China's metropolitan economies: an input-output perspective" in M. Chatterji and Y. Kaizhong (eds) Regional Science in Developing Economies (Macmillan, 1997)
- Geoffrey J.D. Hewings, Philip R. Israilevich, Michael Sonis and Graham R. Schindler, "Structural change in a metropolitan economy: the Chicago region, 1975-2010," in S. Bertuglia, S. Lombardo and P. Nijkamp (eds) Spatial Effects of Innovative Behaviour (Springer-Verlag, 1997)
- Michael Sonis, Geoffrey J.D. Hewings and Eduardo Haddad, "The region versus the rest of the economy: the extraction method," in H. Kohno, J. Poot, P. Nijkamp (eds) Regional Cohesion and Competition in the Process of Globalization (forthcoming, Springer-Verlag, 1997)
