= Regional Economics Applications Laboratory =

Research center at University of Illinois

The Regional Economics Applications Laboratory (REAL)

The Regional Economics Applications Laboratory (REAL) at the University of Illinois at Urbana-Champaign is a regional science research center for advanced graduate students in the fields of economics, geography, urban and regional planning, computer science and mathematics. Professor Geoffrey J.D. Hewings, one of its founders, served as its director until 2016. Professor Sandy Dall'erba has been its director since 2016.

== Main goal ==
Created in 1989 by Philip Israilevich and Geoffrey J.D. Hewings, the Regional Economics Applications Laboratory (REAL) at the University of Illinois at Urbana-Champaign started as a cooperative venture between the Federal Reserve Bank of Chicago and the University of Illinois.

While analyses of economies at the national level have long been prominent in the field of economics, increasing fragmentation of the production process in conjunction with increasing regional specialization due to the reduction of transportation costs obliges us to consider economies from a sub-national or even local perspective. Further, the last decade has seen remarkable progress in techniques for spatial economic analysis – the measurement and interpretation of economic activity across geographies as small as counties to units as extensive as individual countries.

Based on these approaches and techniques, REAL’s mission is to provide timely, high quality analytical economic information for a variety of uses such as public policy decision making by public sector agencies and for strategic marketing in the private sector. REAL's capabilities revolve around comprehensive state and metropolitan models that integrate econometric and input-output analysis to provide for both impact and forecasting analyses. Current activities focus on interstate trade, forecasts for the Chicago, Illinois and other Midwest economies, housing market analysis and forecasts, demographic-economic modeling (especially the role of aging and immigration) and the development of alternative computable general equilibrium models created on the same data base.

== Sources ==
- http://www.real.uiuc.edu/
- http://www.real.uiuc.edu/news/marathon01.pdf
- http://eco.unex.es/eureal/
