= Detroit Free Press Building =

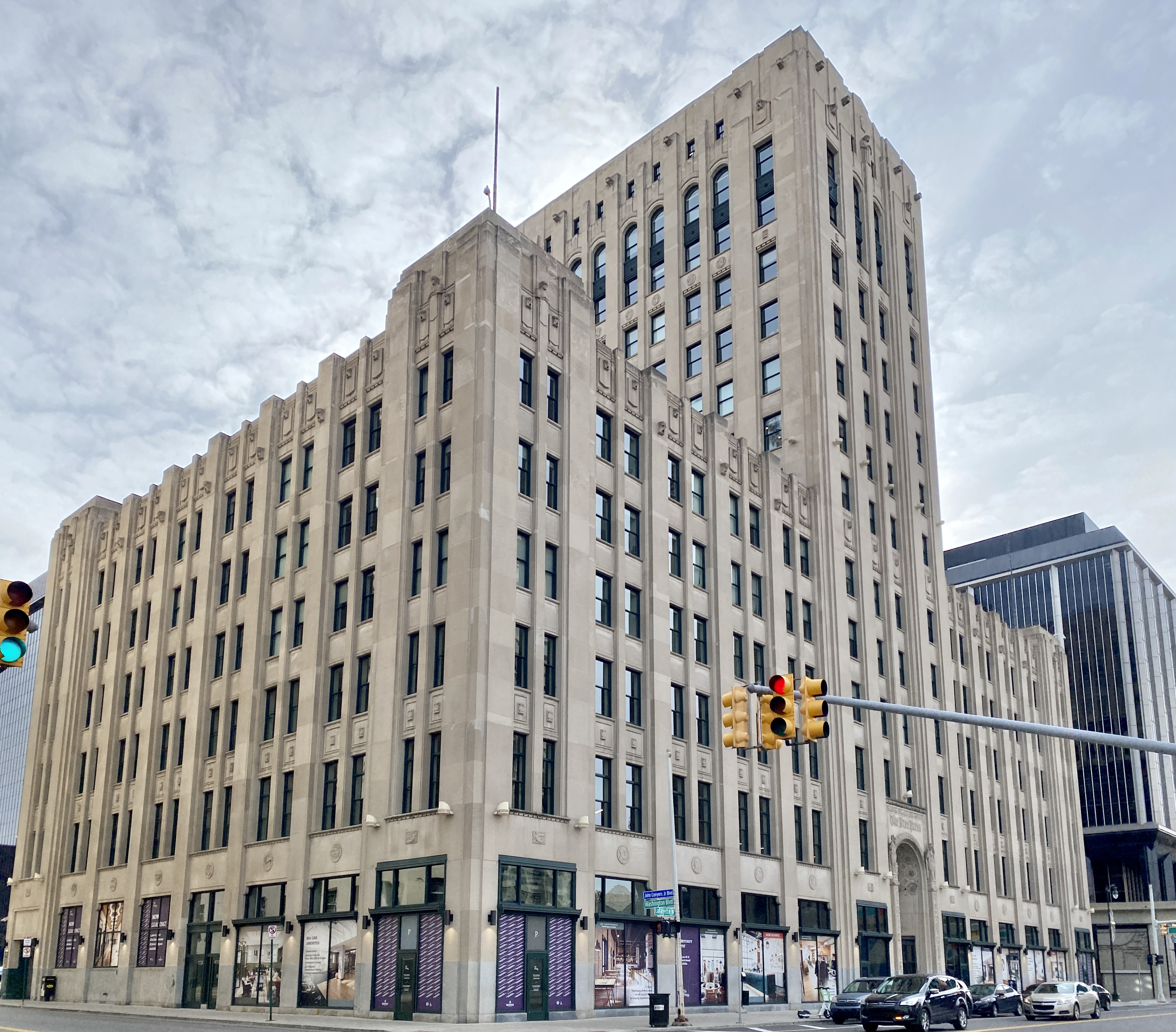
- Interactive map of the Detroit Free Press Building area

General information
- Type: Residential
- Architectural style: Art Deco / Art Moderne
- Location: 321 W. Lafayette Boulevard; Detroit, Michigan
- Coordinates: 42.33°N 83.0508°W
- Construction started: 1924
- Completed: 1925
- Renovated: 2016–2020
- Owner: Bedrock Detroit

Height
- Roof: 57.91 m (190.0 ft)

Technical details
- Floor count: 14; 2 below ground
- Lifts/elevators: 8

Design and construction
- Architect: Albert Kahn

Other information
- Public transit: Fort/Cass

Website
- thepress321detroit.com
- Detroit Free Press Building
- U.S. Historic district – Contributing property
- Michigan State Historic Site
- Part of: Detroit Financial District (ID09001067)

Significant dates
- Designated CP: December 14, 2009
- Designated MSHS: January 8, 1981

The Detroit Free Press Building is a 14-story apartment building in downtown Detroit, Michigan. The Art Deco building was designed by Albert Kahn Associates, and was constructed in the mid-1920s as the headquarters of the Detroit Free Press. The Free Press moved its printing operations out of the building in 1979, and vacated the building in 1998 after it merged its business operations with The Detroit News under a joint operating agreement.

The Free Press Building was vacant until 2016, and was the subject of multiple unsuccessful redevelopment proposals in the early 2000s. The building was redeveloped as an apartment building in the late 2010s, under the ownership of Bedrock Detroit. It reopened in 2020 as The Press/321.

== Architecture ==
The high-rise building contains 302,400 sq ft (28,090 m^{2}) on 14 above-ground and two basement levels. The building features Art Deco detailing, and is a steel-frame structure faced with limestone. Its design features stepped massing in the central tower and flanking wings. When constructed, the building housed editorial and business offices for the paper as well as printing facilities and rental space. The building is adorned with bas-relief figures, sculpted by Ulysses A. Ricci, symbolizing commerce and communication.

== History ==
The building was unoccupied from 1998, when the newspaper offices moved, to 2020, when it was redeveloped as an apartment building. It was formerly the home of the Detroit Free Press, and while occupied by the newspaper, displayed large neon signs of the newspaper logo on its roof facing north and south. Printing facilities for the newspaper occupied the lower floors of the building until 1979, when a new production facility opened approximately one-mile southwest at 1801 West Jefferson Avenue.

In 1989, the newspaper moved its offices to the building Albert Kahn designed for The Detroit News at 615 West Lafayette. Because the News Building is only three stories, it is constructed of reinforced concrete and faced with concrete fashioned to look like stone. When the Free Press offices moved into the building, they occupied the southern portion and used the address of 600 West Fort Street while The News used its long-time address of 615 West Lafayette. In February 2014, both newspapers announced their intent to move to another facility which would be more suited to their current needs.

== Redevelopment ==
Several redevelopment plans were proposed in the 2000s and 2010s, and the redeveloped building reopened in 2020.

In spring 2003, the Detroit Free Press Building was added to a short list of possible sites to replace the Detroit Police Headquarters. Another candidate was the Michigan Central Station, both of which are part of the city's efforts at urban development in Detroit.

In February 2009, owners announced that the building would be turned into a sound stage for Motor City Film Works production, but set no date for completion of the project.

In June 2010, the Detroit Brownfield Redevelopment Authority approved incentive financing for a deal to remake the Free Press Building into residential apartments with office and retail space.

In November 2012, the structure was placed for auction because the owners, Luke Investments, could not agree on a redevelopment plan. The building sold again in September 2013 for approximately $4.15 million. The new owners expected to begin renovations in late 2014 to recreate retail space on the street level and 150 apartments on the upper floors.

In September 2016, billionaire developer Dan Gilbert bought the property, through Pyramid Development Co, LLC, for a reported $8.425 million. Throughout the next four years, the building was redeveloped into a mixed-use project with 8,000 square feet of retail space, 55,000 square feet of office space, and 105 new apartments. The building, renamed "The Press/321", began leasing in September 2020.

== Gallery ==
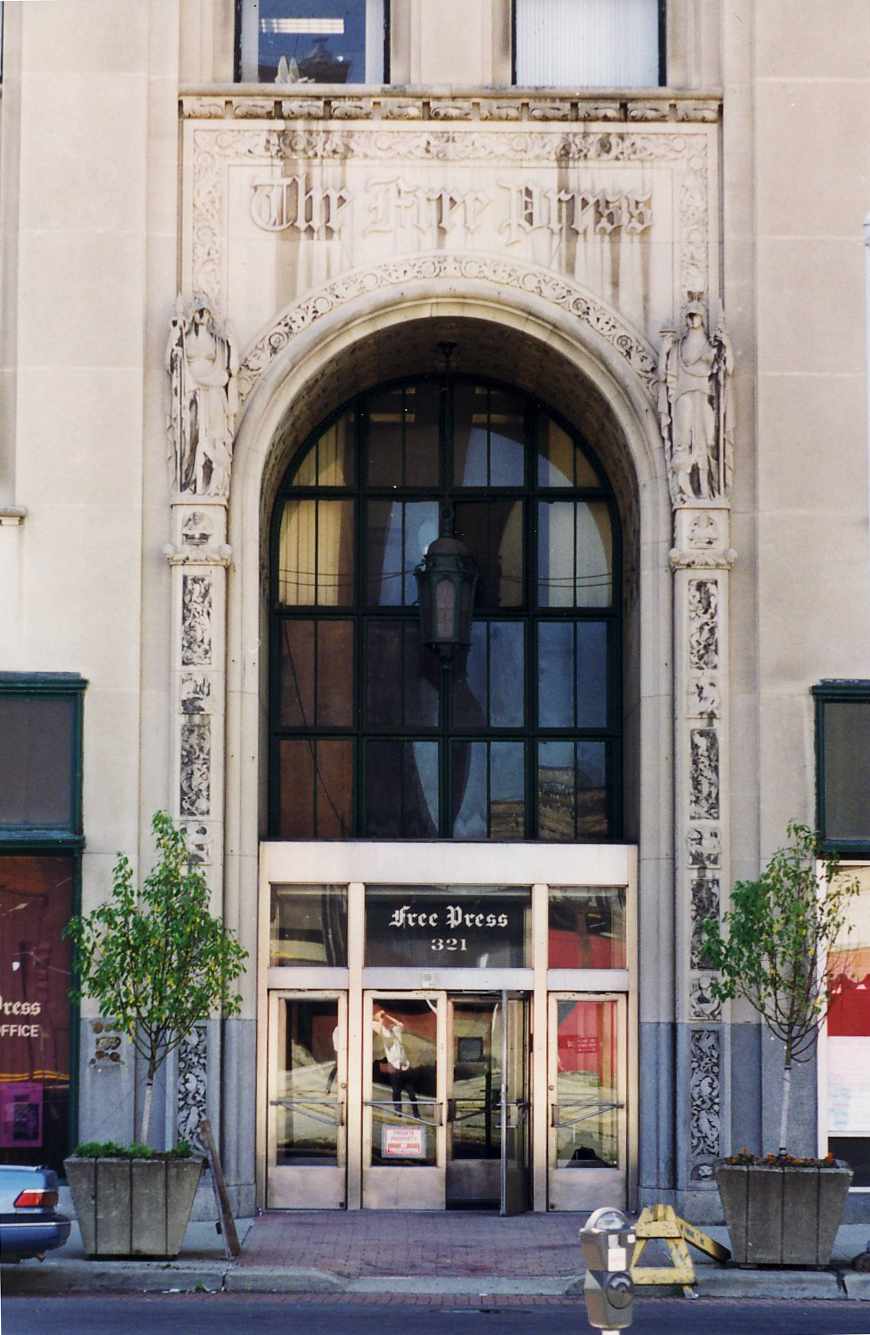
Main entrance

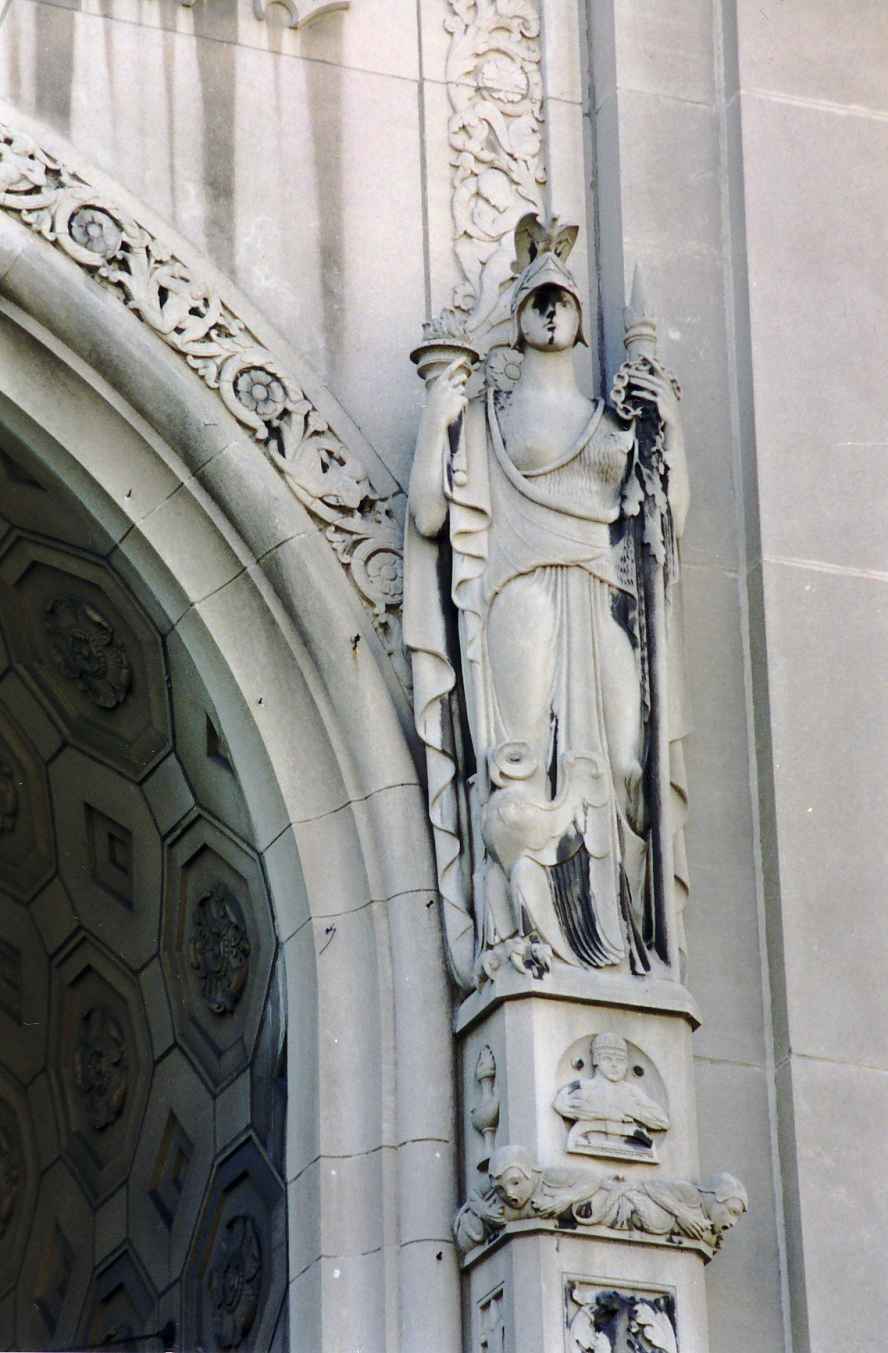
Entrance sculpture detail

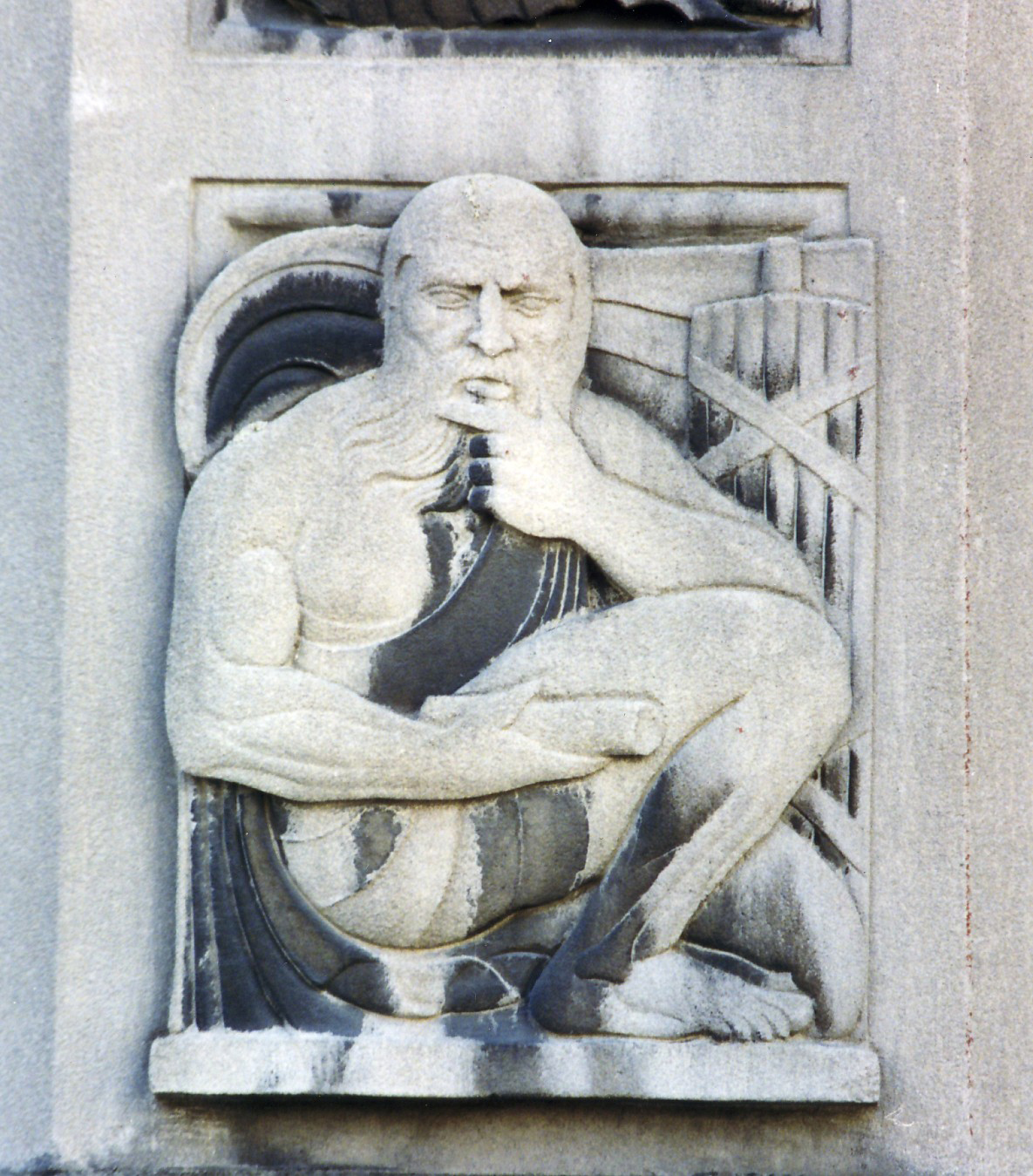
Sculptural detail
