= Anika Goss-Foster =

American nonprofit leader

Anika Goss is a nonprofit leader from Detroit, Michigan. She is the chief executive officer of the nonprofit organization Detroit Future City.

== Biography ==
Goss has a master's degree from the University of Michigan for social work in community organizing. She has a bachelor's degree from Purdue University for sociology and African-American studies. Goss is a member of Delta Sigma Theta sorority.

In 1999, Goss joined the Local Initiatives Support Corporation, a non-profit community development financial institution that supports community development initiatives across the country. Goss worked at LISC for 15 years.

In 2016, Goss joined Detroit Future City as chief executive officer. In 2017, Detroit Future City announced a focus on redeveloping or otherwise dealing with the approximately 900 vacant industrial sites in Detroit.

Goss has been honored by Crain's Detroit Business, The Michigan Chronicle, and Corps! Magazine. She serves on the board of the Federal Reserve Bank of Chicago, Brookings Institution Metropolitan Policy Program Network for Economic Inclusion, Tech Town, Connect Detroit, Michigan Future, Inc., and BMW-Herbert Quandt Responsible Leaders Network. She also serves on Governor Whitmer’s Growing Michigan Together Council, a state commission focusing on population growth.

A report by the Black Worker Initiative at the Institute for Policy Studies featured Goss for her contributions to improving Detroit. She has spoken out against modern segregation.

In 2023, Goss spoke at the TED Countdown Summit, an event seeking to change the conversation on climate change, at the Fillmore Detroit in Detroit, Michigan. Her discussion explored the link between climate vulnerability and economic inequity and offered a vision for responding to both challenges at once.
