= Federal Reserve Bank of Chicago Detroit Branch Building =

- Federal Reserve Bank of Chicago; Detroit Branch Building
- U.S. National Register of Historic Places
- U.S. Historic district – Contributing property
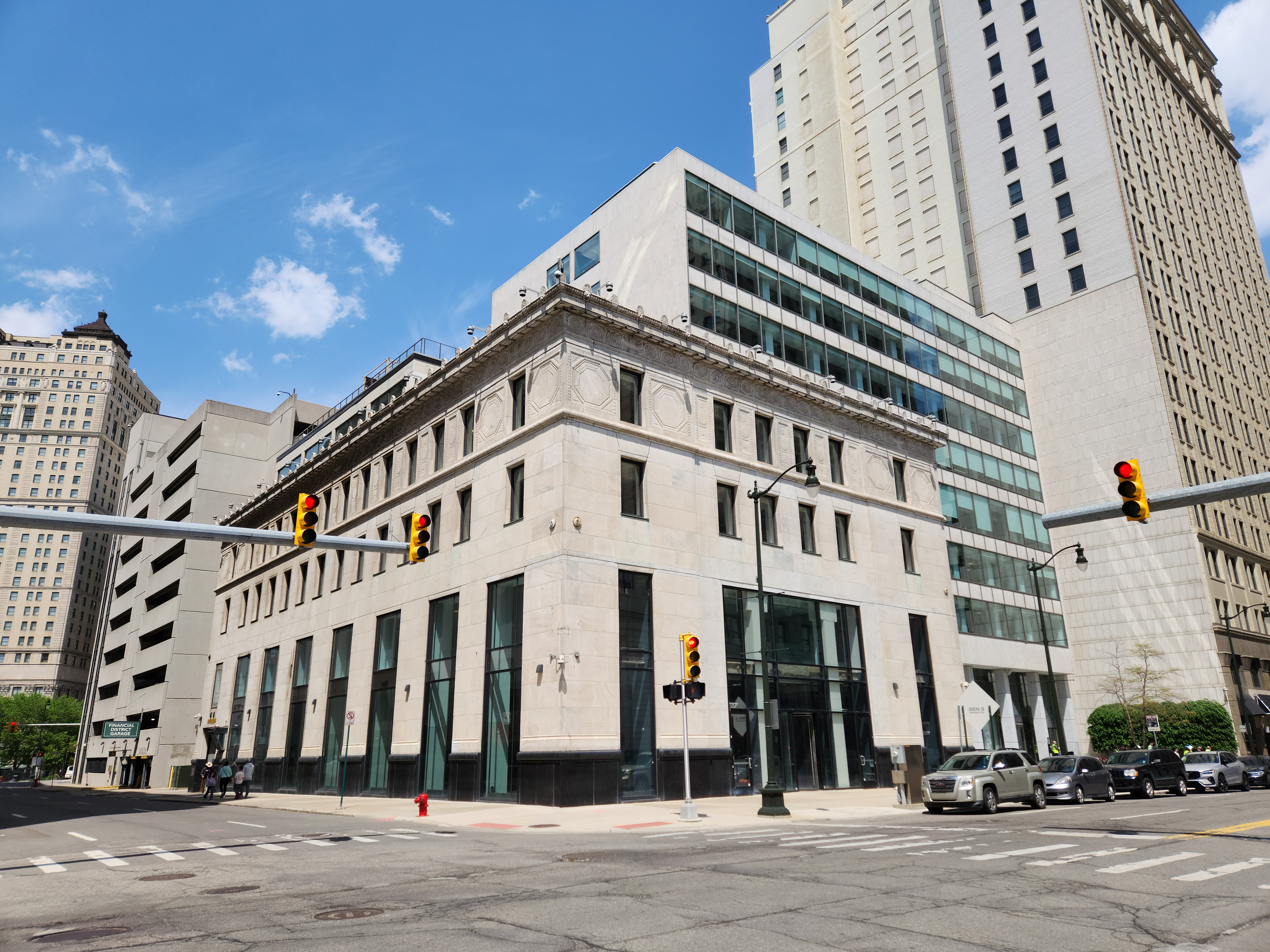
- Exterior, with original 1927 building in foreground, and 1951 annex behind
- Interactive map
- Location: 160 West Fort Street; Detroit, Michigan
- Coordinates: 42°19′51″N 83°2′56″W
- Built: 1927; 1951 (annex)
- Architect: Graham, Anderson, Probst & White; Smith, Hinchman & Grylls/Minoru Yamasaki
- Architectural style: Classical Revival, International Style
- Part of: Detroit Financial District (ID09001067)
- NRHP reference No.: 07001491
- Added to NRHP: January 29, 2008

The Federal Reserve Bank of Chicago Detroit Branch Building, commonly called the Federal Reserve Building, is a bank building located at 160 West Fort Street in downtown Detroit, Michigan. It was listed on the National Register of Historic Places in 2008.

== History ==
In 1913 the United States Congress created the Federal Reserve System, which established twelve regional Federal Reserve Banks, including the Federal Reserve Bank of Chicago. Detroit was included in the Chicago region. Regional banks had the authority to create branch offices, and in 1917 the Federal Reserve Bank of Chicago authorized the establishment of a Detroit Branch. In March 1918, the Detroit Branch opened, operating out of three local institutions. However, Detroit operations soon outgrew this operation, and in 1921 a site was chosen for a new building.

This site was within the Detroit Financial District, at a location that had once been part of Fort Shelby. After the fort was demolished, the land associated with it was divided into lots. Hiram Walker purchased several lots and constructed a house there. After Walker's death, the University Club purchased the house, and in 1916 the property was purchased by James Couzens. Couzens sold the land this building is located on to the Federal Reserve in 1921. In 1926, Congress authorized the construction of this building. The Federal Reserve hired the Chicago firm of Graham, Anderson, Probst & White to design it, and construction began in 1927.

The building officially opened in December 1927. However, by the early 1940s, the branch office had outgrown the building's capacity. In 1945, the Federal Reserve purchased lots adjacent to the building, and hired the firm of Smith, Hinchman & Grylls to design an annex. The firm's head designer, Minoru Yamasaki, planned the building. Construction began in 1949, and by 1951, the eight-story glass-and-marble annex, opened. The Modern annex is clearly designed not to mimic the original building, but to make a statement all its own. After completion of the annex, the original building was gutted and renovated, and the entire complex opened in 1953.

In 2004, the Federal Reserve Bank moved to a new building at 1600 East Warren Avenue, leaving the building on Fort empty. A developer purchased the building with the intention of creating loft space. However, Dan Gilbert purchased the building on January 30, 2012.

Gilbert began a $12 million renovation which was completed in 2013 and included a revamped mixed-use approach by Detroit-based architectural firm Rossetti.

In February 2014, the Detroit Media Partnership, parent of the Detroit Free Press and The Detroit News, announced all three organizations would occupy six floors in both the old and new sections of the building. The partnership expected to place signs on the exterior similar to those on the former headquarters. The move took place October 24–27, 2014.

== Description ==
The Federal Reserve Bank of Chicago Detroit Branch Building consists of a 1927 three-and-one-half-story marble-faced Classical Revival bank building and a 1951 eight-story International Style Annex. The Annex is set back 30 feet from the front of the original building, and a small raised plaza is sited in front of the Annex and beside the original building. The floor levels of the two buildings are aligned, and the original building was gutted with the Annex was constructed, providing a seamless transition between the structures. The fourth floor of the original building was demolished to provide space for a penthouse projecting from the Annex, and a terrace for outdoor seating.

The original 1927 building measures 75 by 130 feet (23 m × 40 m), and has a black marble base approximately four feet high, with the upper section sheathed in white marble. A heavy stringcourse above the second-story windows separates the lower floors from the third (attic) story. The first-floor windows are multi-paned six-over-six windows with a cast-iron spandrel between each pair. The second and third floors originally had one-over-one double-hung windows, but these have been replaced with a single pane. The original main entrance of the building was eliminated in the 1951 renovation.

The 1951 Annex measures 115 by 100 feet (35 m × 30 m). The curtain walls are constructed from a grid of stainless steel from which 1-1/2" marble slabs are suspended. The ground floor is divided into seven bays by marble piers. The curtain walls on the upper floors extend three feet beyond the recessed ground floor piers. The white marble used in this structure was carefully chosen to match the color of the original building, and the glass was tinted green to reduce glare.
