= Federal Reserve Bank of Chicago =

Member Bank of Federal Reserve

Coordinates: 41°52′43″N 87°37′54″W

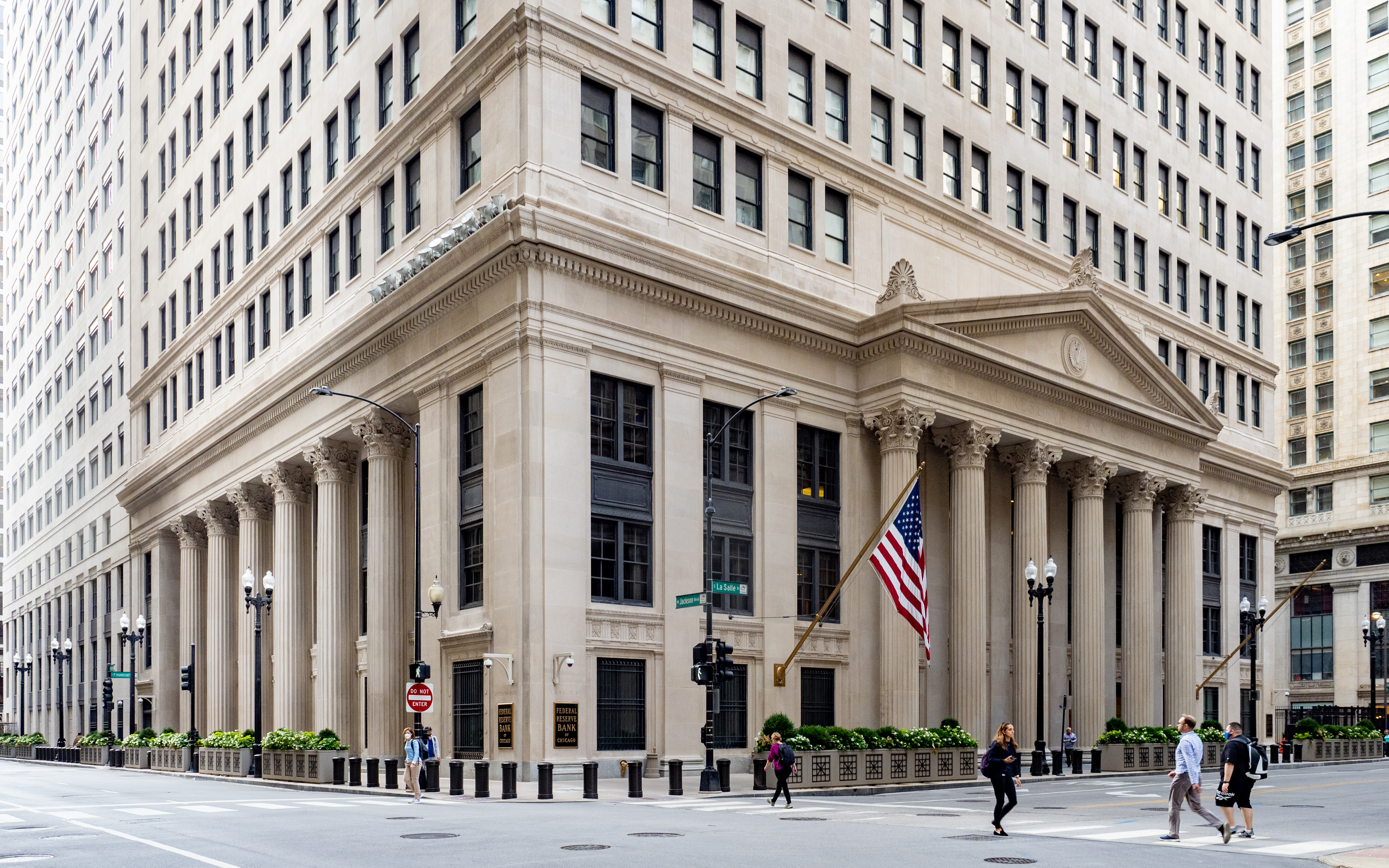
- The Federal Reserve Bank of Chicago in 2021
- Central bank of: Seventh District: Iowa Parts of: Illinois; Indiana; Michigan; Wisconsin
- Headquarters: 230 S LaSalle Street; Chicago, Illinois, U.S.
- Established: May 18, 1914 (112 years ago)
- President: Austan Goolsbee
- Website: chicagofed.org
- The Federal Reserve Bank of Chicago is one of 12 regional banks that make up the Federal Reserve System

The Federal Reserve Bank of Chicago (informally the Chicago Fed) is one of the twelve Federal Reserve Banks of the United States. It is responsible for the Seventh District of the Federal Reserve System, which encompasses the northern portions of Illinois and Indiana, southern Wisconsin, the Lower Peninsula of Michigan, and Iowa. The district is headquartered in Chicago and has a branch office in Detroit. The bank's chief executive officer and president is Austan Goolsbee.

In addition to participation in the formulation of monetary policy, each Reserve Bank supervises member banks and bank holding companies, provides financial services to depository institutions and the U.S. government, and monitors economic conditions in its district. The Chicago Fed was established on May 18, 1914, when representatives from five Seventh District banks formally signed the Chicago Fed's organization certificate. The Bank officially opened for business on Monday, November 16, 1914.

== Responsibilities ==
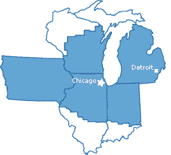
Map of the Seventh District

As one of the Reserve Banks that make up the Federal Reserve System, the Chicago Fed is responsible for:

- Helping to formulate national monetary policy. The Chicago Fed's CEO, Austan Goolsbee, helps formulate monetary policy by taking part and voting in meetings of the Federal Open Market Committee (FOMC).
- Providing financial services such as cash, check clearing and electronic payment processing. Each day the Federal Reserve System processes millions of payments in the form of both paper checks and electronic transfers. These payments services are offered to institutions in the Seventh District on a fee basis. Because of a nationwide reduction in the use of checking instruments, the Chicago Fed and most other Reserve Banks ceased processing paper checks on November 17, 2009, and electronic checks in 2010. Items previously routed to this facility are now routed to the Federal Reserve Bank of Cleveland or to the Federal Reserve Bank of Atlanta.
- Supervising and regulating state-chartered banks that are members of the Federal Reserve System, bank holding companies, and financial holding companies. These organizations are located within the Seventh District.

== Leadership ==
Austan Goolsbee is the current president of the Chicago Fed. He took office on January 9, 2023, as the tenth president and chief executive officer of the Federal Reserve Bank of Chicago.

Shonda Clay is first vice president and chief operating officer of the Chicago Fed.

Gadi Barlevy is Executive Vice President and Director of Research.

== History ==
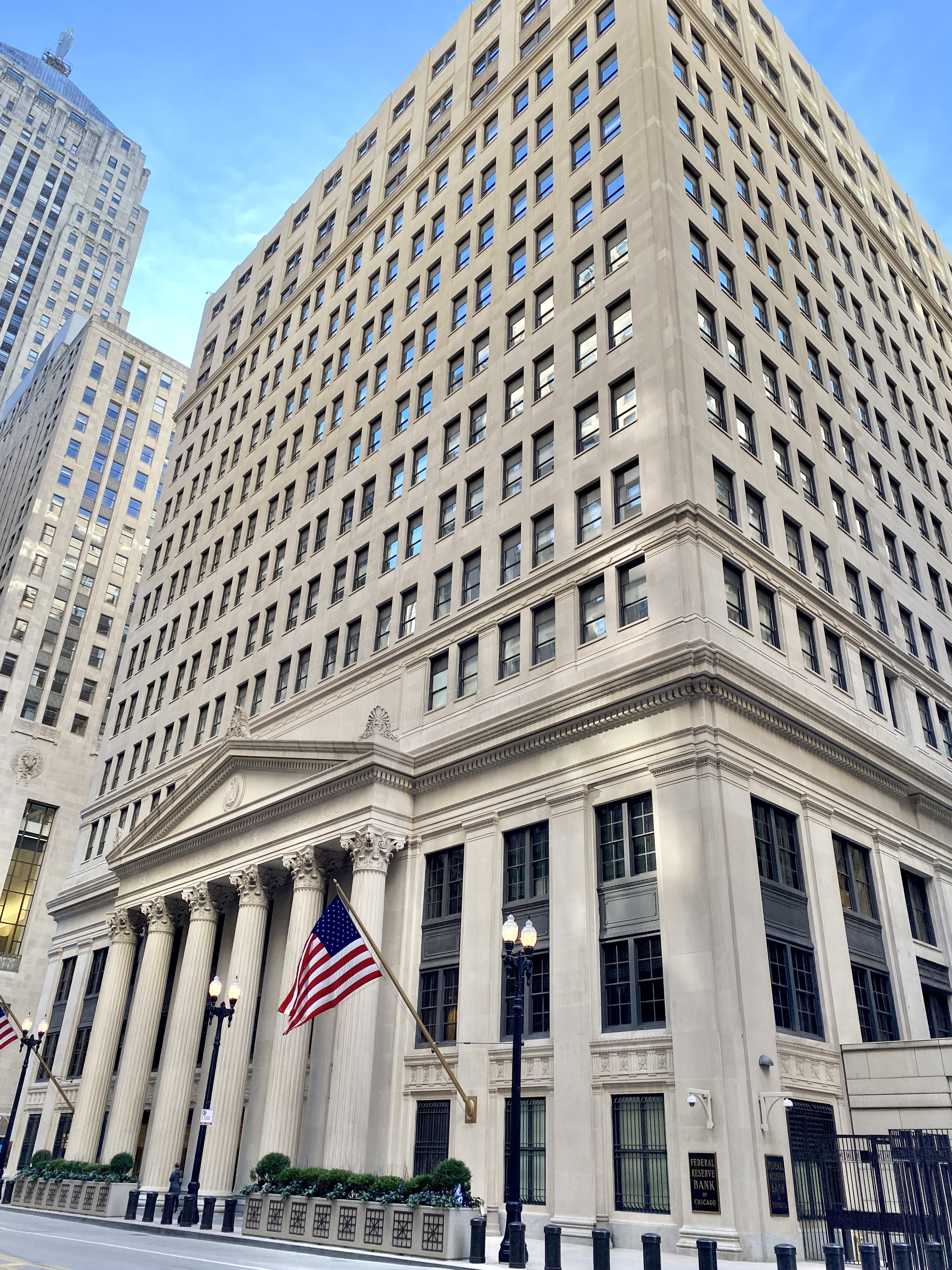
The Chicago Fed's headquarters is 17 stories high

The Chicago Fed was established on May 18, 1914, when representatives from five Seventh District banks formally signed the Chicago Fed's organization certificate. The Bank officially opened for business with 41 employees on Monday, November 16, 1914.

Bankers in Michigan, frustrated by business delays caused by travel time to Chicago, lobbied the Chicago Fed to create a branch office in Detroit (then the second largest industrial area in the Seventh District). The Bank's board of directors agreed to establish a Detroit Branch in a vote in November 1917.

By 1919, the Chicago Fed had expanded to 1,200 employees and outgrown its office spaces, which were scattered across various buildings in the Loop. The Bank purchased a lot on LaSalle Street and commissioned the architectural firm of Graham, Anderson, Probst and White—which also designed the Continental Illinois Building across the street—to design its new headquarters. The landmark Beaux-Arts building opened in 1922.

The Bank opened its Money Museum in 2001.

== Money Museum ==
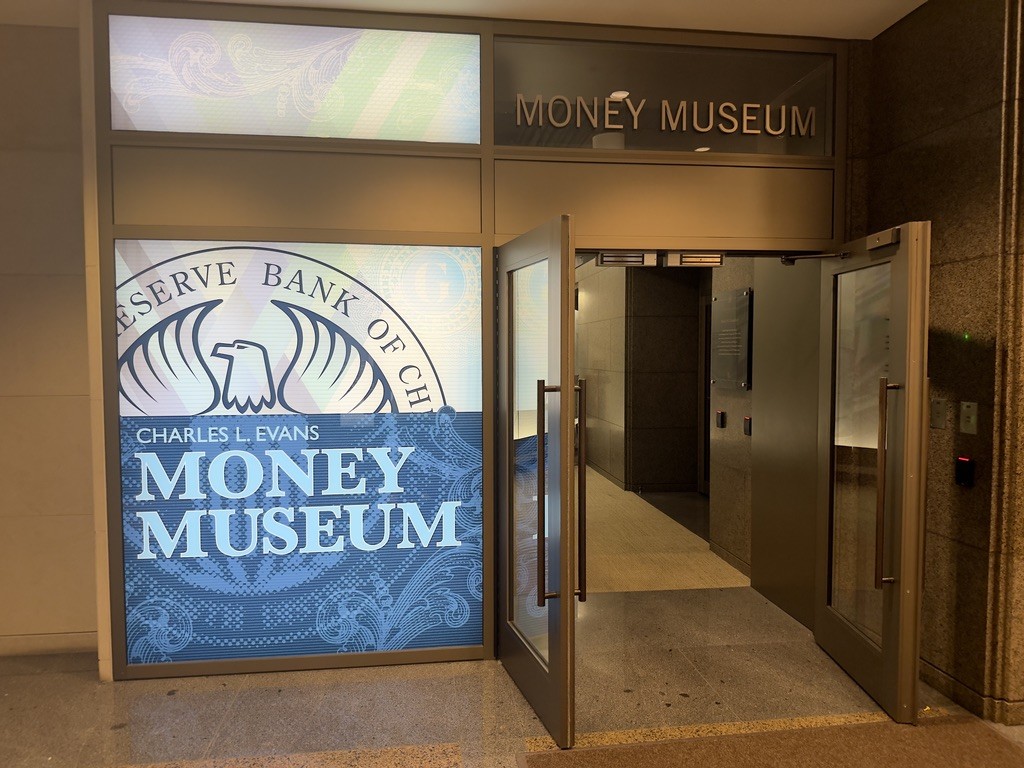
Money Museum entrance.

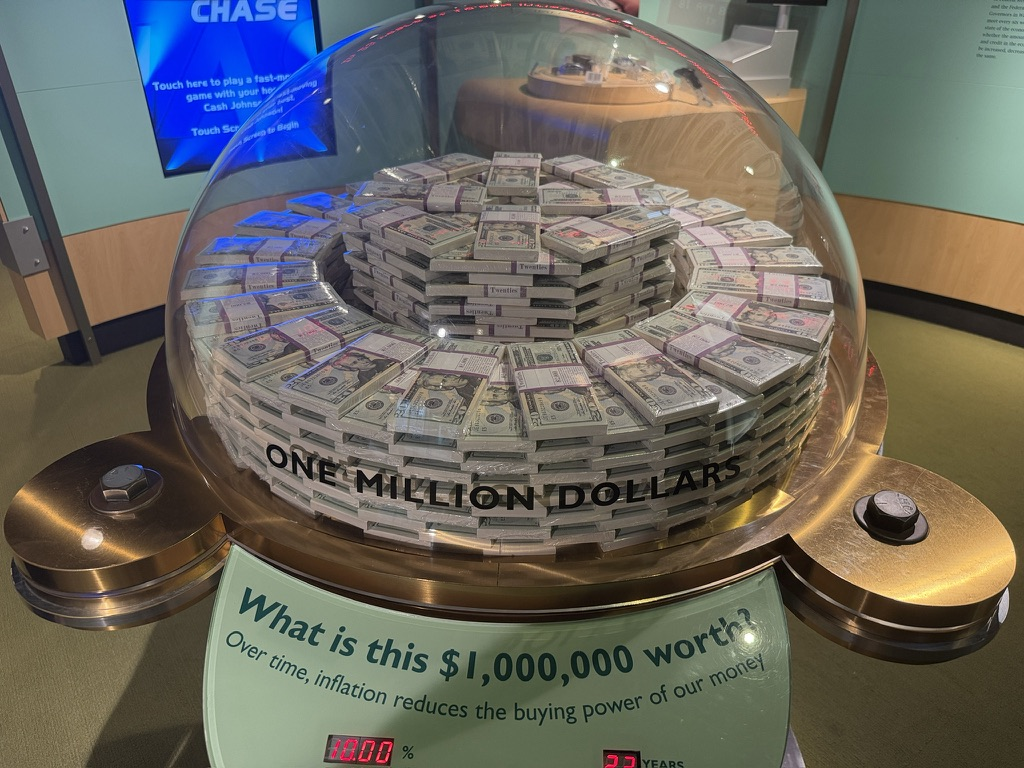
$1 million in cash on display.

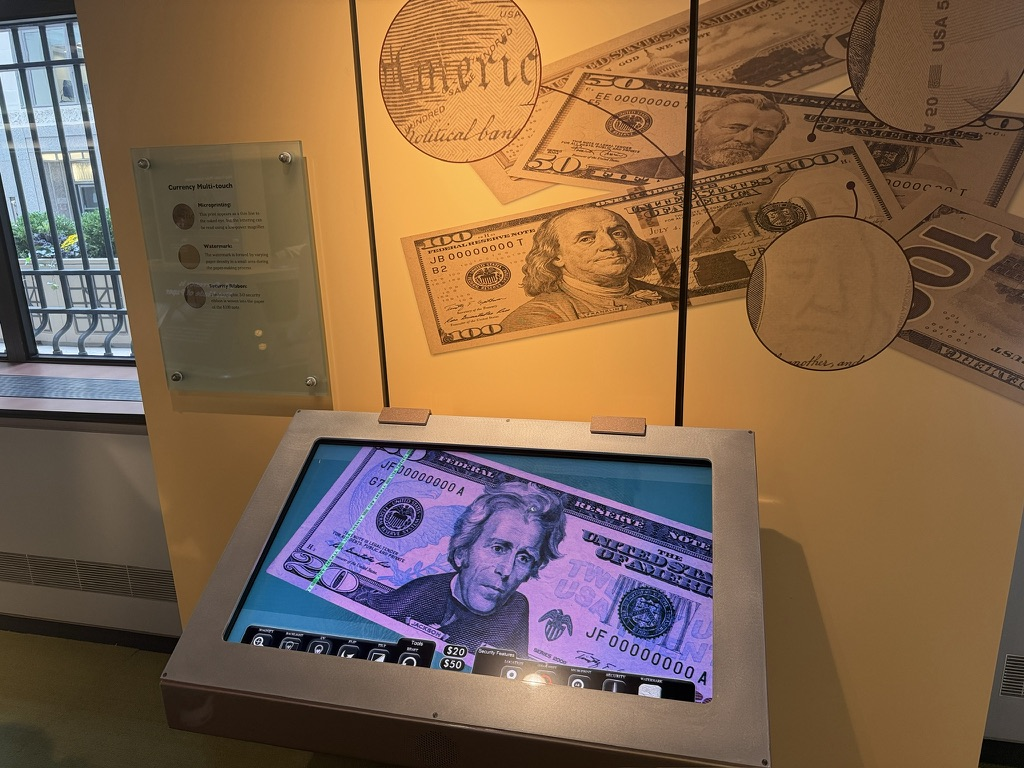
Interactive exhibit.

The bank's Charles L. Evans Money Museum is free and open to the public year-round from 10am to 5pm, Monday through Friday, except on Bank holidays. All visitors must show a photo identification, walk through a metal detector and have their bags x-rayed before entering the Money Museum. No food or drink are allowed in the museum. Group tours are available by appointment. The rest of the Money Museum is accessible at any time during open hours. The museum includes displays of a million dollars in $100 bills and a million dollars in $20 bills, as well as a cube which is described as a million dollars in $1 bills. However, one web commenter contends that the number of $1 bills in the cube is closer to 1.5 million, which some claim is due to contractors building the cube in the wrong dimensions. The museum is known for giving out bags of shredded money as souvenirs.

== Branch ==
The Federal Reserve Bank of Chicago has one branch, located in Detroit. The Detroit branch is located at 1600 East Warren Avenue, in a building that opened in 2004. The branch opened in 1927, and its former headquarters building at 160 West Fort Street was listed on the National Register of Historic Places in 2008.

== Board of directors ==
The following people are on the board of directors as of 2023. Class A directors are elected by member banks to represent member banks. Class B directors are elected by member banks to represent the public. Class C directors are appointed by the board of governors to represent the public. The current chair is Jennifer Scanlon and the current deputy chair Juan Salgado.

Members of board of directors
Director	Title	Director Class	Term Expires
Christopher J. Murphy III	Chairman and chief executive officer, 1st Source Bank, South Bend, Indiana	A	2024
Michael O'Grady	Chairman and chief executive officer, Northern Trust, Chicago, Illinois	A	2023
Susan Whitson	Chief Executive Officer, First Bank, Waverly, Iowa	A	2025
David C. Habinger	President & Chief Executive Officer, J.D. Power, Troy, Michigan	B	2023
Linda Hubbard	President and Chief Operating Officer, Carhartt, Inc., Dearborn, Michigan	B	2024
Linda Jojo	Executive Vice President, Chief Customer Officer, United Airlines, Inc., Chicago, Illinois	B	2025
Juan Salgado, Deputy Chair	Chancellor, City Colleges of Chicago, Chicago, Illinois	C	2024
Jennifer Scanlon, Chair	President & Chief Executive Officer, UL Solutions, Northbrook, Illinois	C	2024
Maurice Smith	President, CEO and Vice Chair, Health Care Service Corporation, Chicago, Illinois	C	2025

Detroit Branch Board of Directors
Director	Title	Term Expires
Kofi Bonner	Chief Executive Officer, Bedrock Management Services, Detroit, Michigan	2025
Chávez, JoAnn	Senior Vice President and Chief Legal Officer, DTE Energy, Detroit, Michigan	2023
Anika Goss	Chief Executive Officer, Detroit Future City, Detroit, Michigan	2024
Ronald E. Hall	President and chief executive officer, Bridgewater Interiors, LLC, Detroit, Michigan	2025
James M. Nicholson	Chairman, PVS Chemicals, Inc., Detroit, Michigan	2024
Kevin Nowlan	Executive Vice President and Chief Financial Officer, BorgWarner Inc., Auburn Hills, Michigan	2023
Dr. M. Roy Wilson	President, Wayne State University, Detroit, Michigan	2023

== See also ==
- Federal Reserve Act
- Federal Reserve System
- Federal Reserve Districts
- Federal Reserve Branches
- Federal Reserve Bank of Chicago Detroit Branch
- Structure of the Federal Reserve System
