= Detroit Free Press =

American newspaper

- On Guard for 195 Years

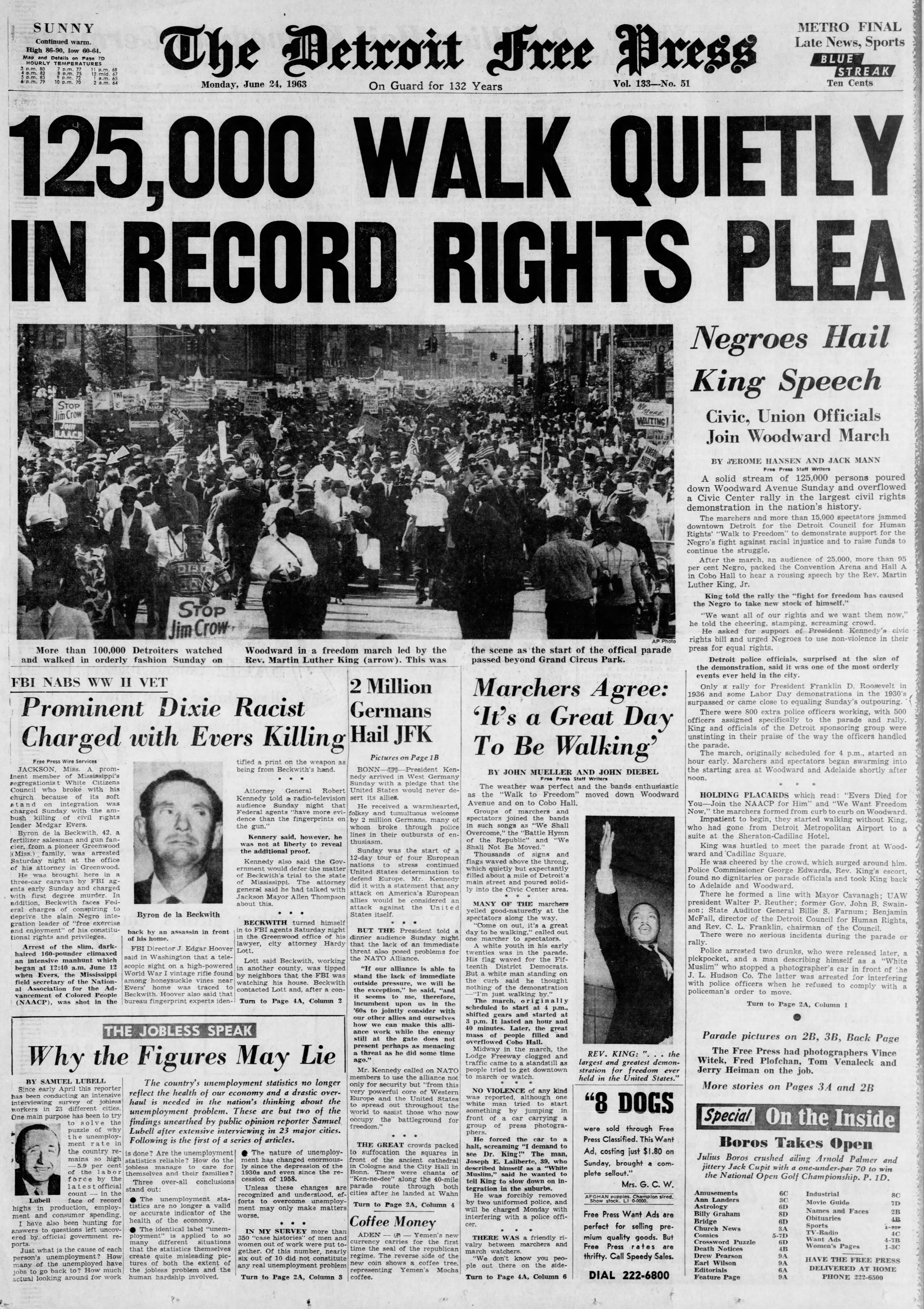
- Front page on June 24, 1963, after the Detroit Walk to Freedom
- Type: Daily newspaper
- Format: Broadsheet
- Owner: USA Today Co.
- President: Timothy Gruber
- Editor: Nicole Avery Nichols
- Founded: 1831
- Headquarters: 19 Clifford Street; Detroit, Michigan 48226; United States
- Circulation: 26,201 average print circulation 4,175 digital subscribers
- ISSN: 1055-2758
- OCLC number: 137343179
- Website: freep.com

The Detroit Free Press, commonly referred to as the Freep, is one of two major daily newspapers in Detroit, Michigan, United States. It is owned by USA Today Co., which also owns the main historical rival The Detroit News. Both newspapers operated under a joint operating agreement from 1989 until 2025. The Sunday edition is titled the Sunday Free Press. The Free Press has received ten Pulitzer Prizes, as well as four Emmy Awards. Its motto is "On Guard for 195 Years".

== History ==
=== 1831–1989: Competitive newspaper ===
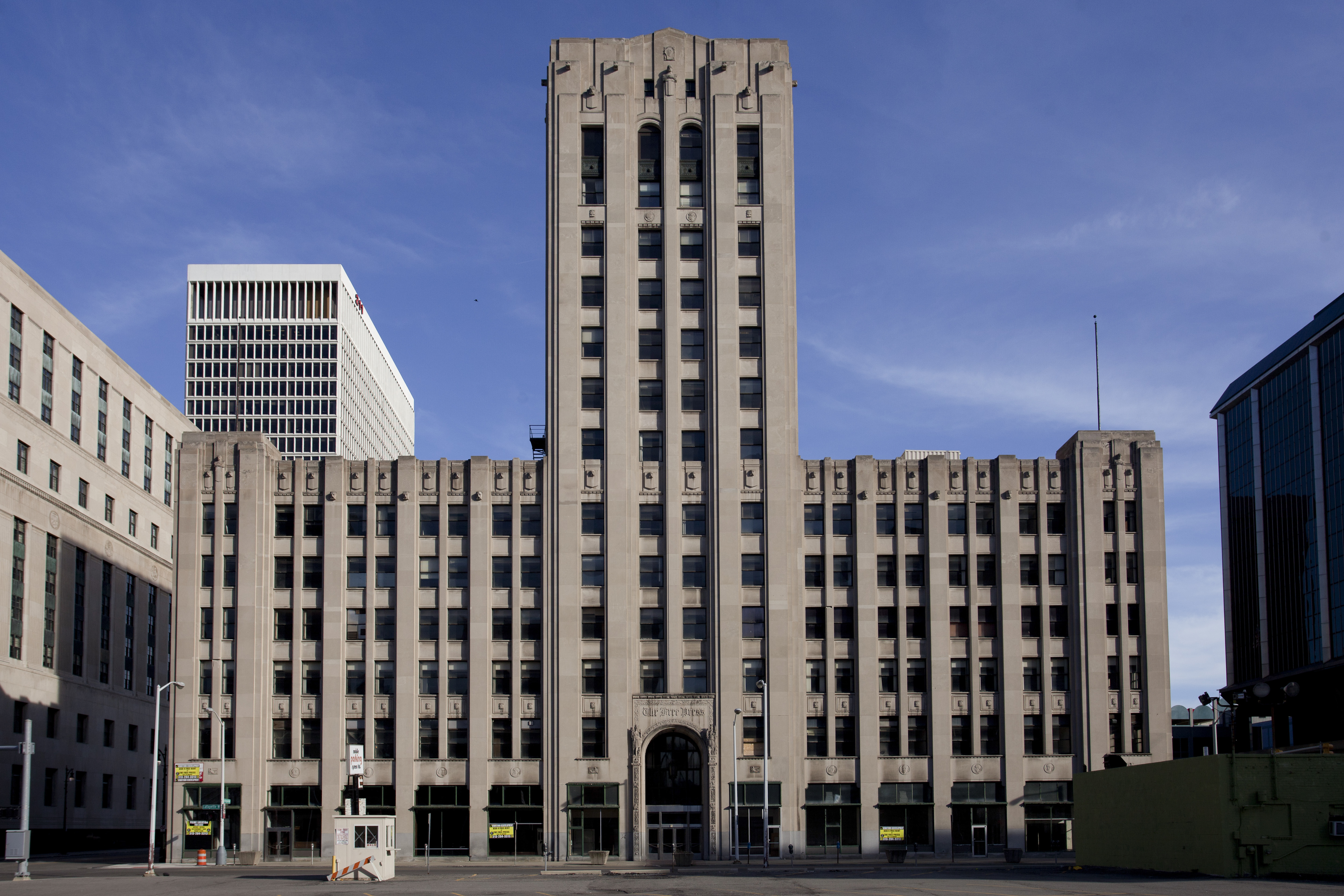
The Detroit Free Press Building was the home of the Free Press offices from 1925 to 1998.

The newspaper was launched by John R. Williams and his uncle, Joseph Campau, and was first published as the Democratic Free Press and Michigan Intelligencer on May 5, 1831. It was renamed to Detroit Daily Free Press in 1835, becoming the region's first daily newspaper. Williams printed the first issues on a Washington press he purchased from the discontinued Oakland Chronicle of Pontiac. It was hauled from Pontiac in a wagon over rough roads to a building at Bates and Woodbridge streets in Detroit. The hand-operated press required two people and could produce 250 pages per hour. The first issues were 14 by 20 inches (360 mm × 510 mm) in size, with five columns of type. Sheldon McKnight became the first publisher, with his uncle John Pitts Sheldon as the editor.

In the 1850s, the paper was developed into a leading Democratic Party-aligned publication under the ownership of Wilbur F. Storey. Storey left for the Chicago Times in 1861, taking much of the staff with him. In the 1870s ownership passed to William E. Quinby, who continued its Democratic leanings and established a London, England edition. In 1904, a group of investors (including prominent journalist Otto Carmichael of the Detroit Journal) purchased the Free Press and sold it for a substantial sum of money five years later.

In 1940, the Knight Newspapers (later Knight Ridder) purchased the Free Press. During the next 20 years, the Free Press competed in the southeastern Michigan market with The Detroit News and the Detroit Times, until the Times was purchased and closed by The News on November 7, 1960. The Free Press was delivered and sold as a night paper, with home deliveries made after 7:00 pm until around 1966. A morning "Blue Streak Edition" was available at news stands beginning around 1965, meaning the Free Press actually printed two editions per day. During that period The Detroit News was sold and delivered as an afternoon newspaper.

=== 1989–2014: Joint operating agreement ===
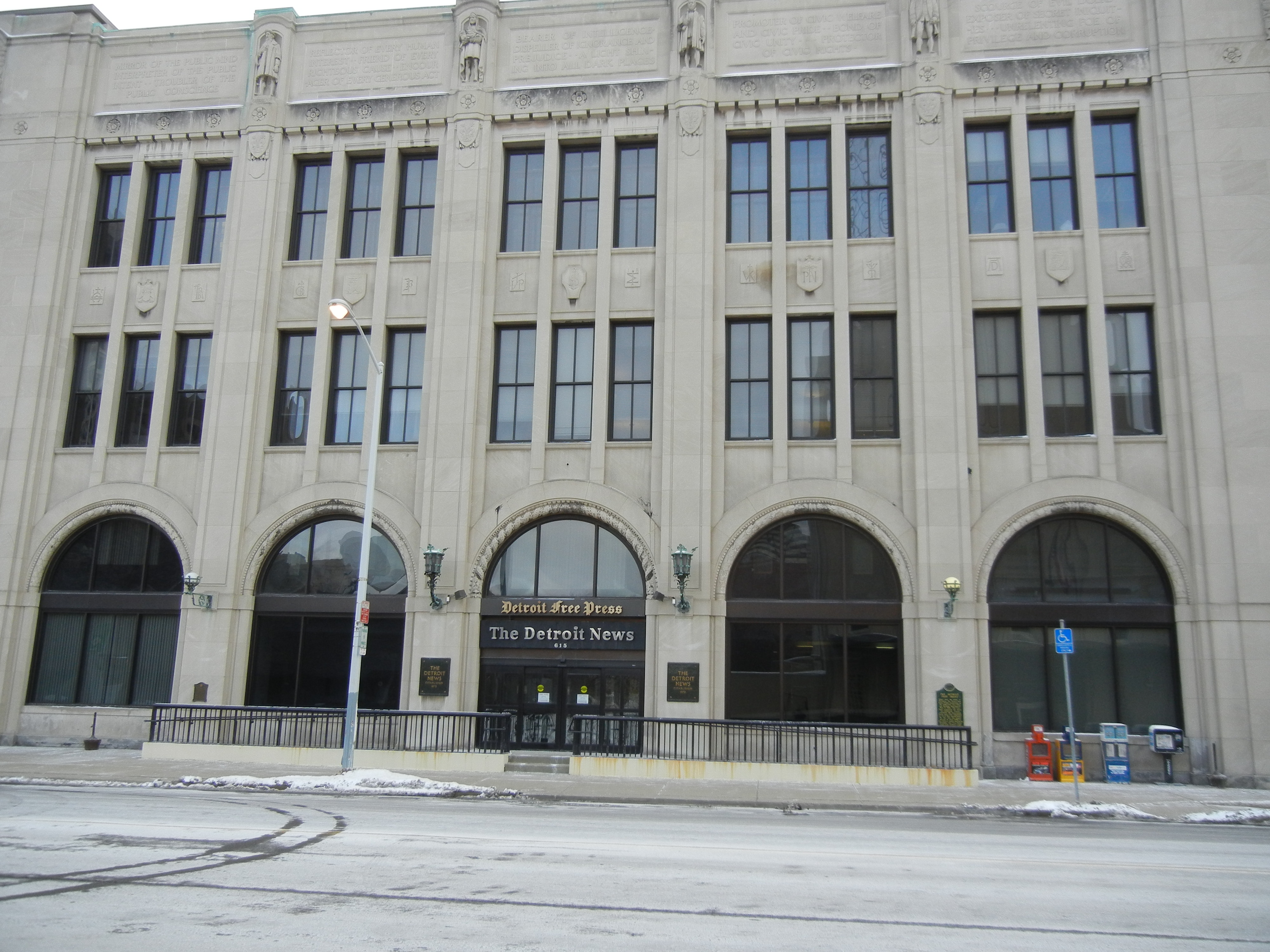
The Detroit News Complex was the home of the Detroit Free Press offices from 1998 to 2014.

The September 11, 2011 front page of the Detroit Free Press, with Eric Millikin art and Mitch Albom column about the 10th anniversary of the September 11 attacks

In 1989, the paper entered into a one hundred-year joint operating agreement with its rival, combining business operations while maintaining separate editorial staffs. The combined company is called the Detroit Media Partnership. The two papers also began to publish joint Saturday and Sunday editions, though the editorial content of each remained separate. At the time, the Detroit Free Press was the tenth-highest circulation paper in the United States, and the combined Detroit News and Free Press was the country's fourth-largest Sunday paper.

On July 13, 1995, Newspaper Guild-represented employees of the Free Press and News and the pressmen, printers and Teamsters working for the "Detroit Newspapers" distribution arm went on strike. By October, about 40% of the editorial staffers had crossed the picket line, and many trickled back over the next months while others stayed out for the two and a half years of the strike. The strike was resolved in court three years later, and the unions remain active at the paper, representing a majority of the employees under their jurisdiction.

In 1998, the Free Press vacated its former headquarters in downtown Detroit and moved to offices into The Detroit News' building and began to operate from its new offices in that building on June 26 of that year. On August 3, 2005, Knight Ridder sold the Free Press to the Gannett Company, which had previously owned and operated The Detroit News. Gannett, in turn, sold The News to MediaNews Group; Gannett continues to be the managing partner in the papers' joint operating agreement. The Free Press resumed publication of its own Sunday edition, May 7, 2006, without any content from The News, other than that The News would print its editorial page in the Sunday Free Press.

On December 16, 2008, Detroit Media Partnership (DMP) announced a plan to limit weekday home delivery for both dailies to Thursday and Friday only. On other weekdays the paper sold at newsstands would be smaller, about 32 pages, and redesigned. This arrangement went into effect March 30, 2009. The Free Press entered a news partnership with CBS owned-and-operated station WWJ-TV channel 62 in March 2009 to produce a morning news show called First Forecast Mornings. Prior to the partnership, WWJ aired absolutely no local newscast at all.

In February 2014, the DMP announced its offices along with those of the Free Press and The Detroit News would occupy six floors in both the old and new sections of the former Federal Reserve building at 160 West Fort Street. The partnership expected to place signs on the exterior similar to those on the former offices. The move took place beginning in October 2014.

=== 2015–present: Ownership changes ===
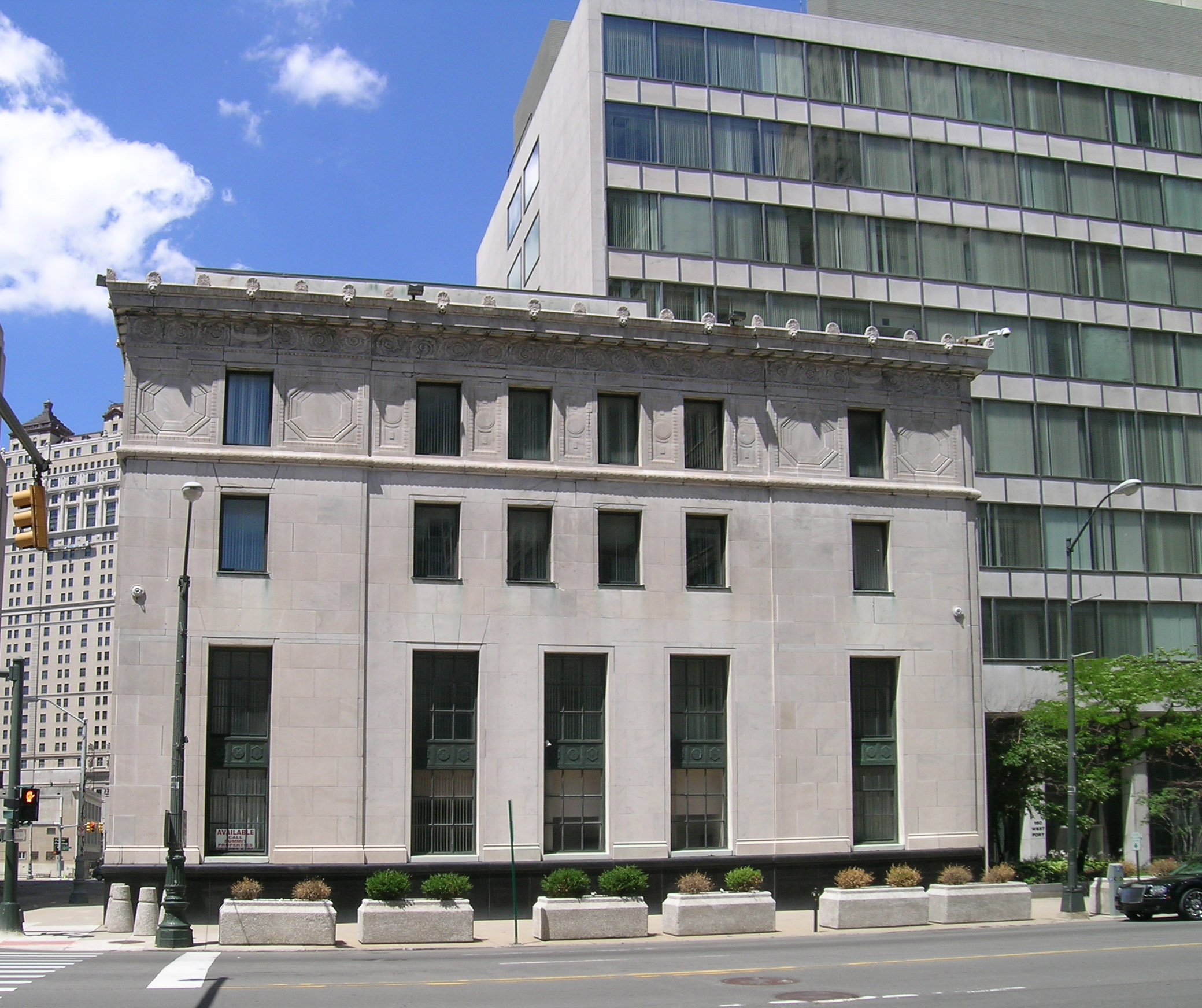
The Federal Reserve Building was the home of the Detroit Free Press and Detroit News offices from 2014 to 2024.

In June 2015, Gannett split itself into two companies. The company's television broadcasters and digital publishers became part of a new company known as Tegna Inc. while its traditional print publishers became part of a new Gannett. In 2018, the Detroit Free Press received two Salute to Excellence awards from the National Association of Black Journalists. In November 2019, the newspaper announced it would cut four staff positions ahead of the GateHouse Media conglomerate completing its purchase of Gannett. The Gannett board finalized the purchase agreement on November 19, 2019.

In December 2024, the newspaper moved from West Fort Street after receiving notice from the building owner, Dan Gilbert's Bedrock Management Services, that it was planning to redevelop the structure. Free Press offices moved to a facility on Clifford Street in the Grand Circus Park Historic District. The Detroit News moved its offices to a historic building at 6001 Cass Avenue.

In January 2025, Gannett announced it would close the paper's printing facility in Sterling Heights, Michigan with 115 jobs lost. The printing of 32 newspapers would be transferred to other plants. About six months later, Gannett announced it would not renew the joint operating agreement with The Detroit News which was set to expire at the end of the year. The joint operating agreement ended on December 28, 2025.

== Other Free Press publications ==
- Screen & Radio Weekly (1934–1940)
- McGraw, Bill; Gavrilovich, Peter, eds. (2001). The Detroit Almanac: 300 Years of Life in the Motor City. Detroit Free Press. ISBN 978-0-9372-4748-8.

== Notable people ==
- Mitch Albom
- Edward A. Batchelor
- Jack Berry
- Eva Best
- Donna Britt
- Frank Bruni
- Mike Downey
- Joe Falls
- John Gallagher
- David Gilkey
- Robin Givhan
- Susan Goldberg
- Ellen Goodman
- Gary Graff
- Sam Greene
- Edgar Guest
- Dick Guindon
- Ken Hamblin
- Stephen Henderson
- Jemele Hill
- Lee Hills
- Royce Howes
- Clark Hoyt
- Joe S. Jackson
- David Cay Johnston
- Dorothy Misener Jurney
- Michelle Kaufman
- David Lawrence Jr.
- John C. Lodge
- Kurt Luedtke
- Myra MacPherson
- Dori J. Maynard
- Eric Millikin
- Elvis Mitchell
- Al Neuharth
- Jack Ohman
- Rob Parker
- William E. Quinby
- Rochelle Riley
- James Risen
- Gene Roberts
- Neal Rubin
- Lyall Smith
- Jennie O. Starkey
- Wilbur F. Storey
- Joe Stroud
- Neely Tucker
- David Turnley
- Rob Wagner
- Lewis Walter
- Taro Yamasaki

== See also ==
- Media in Detroit
