= Newspaper Preservation Act of 1970 =

United States law

The Newspaper Preservation Act of 1970 was an Act of the United States Congress, signed by President Richard Nixon, authorizing the formation of joint operating agreements (JOAs) among competing newspaper operations within the same media market area. It exempted newspapers from certain provisions of antitrust laws. Its drafters argued that this would allow the survival of multiple daily newspapers in a given urban market where circulation was declining. This exemption stemmed from the observation that the alternative is usually for at least one of the newspapers, generally the one published in the evening, to cease operations altogether.

In practice two daily newspapers published in the same city or geographic area combine business operations while maintaining separate—and competitive—news operations.

== History ==
The first joint operating agreement was between Albuquerque Tribune (then the New Mexico State Tribune) and the Albuquerque Journal in Albuquerque, New Mexico, signed on February 20, 1933. Their agreement became typical of the type—both papers were printed on the same presses at different times of day. Classified advertising sales were consolidated, as were distribution agents. A joint entity to perform these functions was created, with equal representation on its board from both papers. Newsgathering and editorial operations remained completely separate, although located under one roof in different portions of the same building.

Arrangements similar to this allowed most medium-sized United States cities to have two daily newspapers until fairly recently. The number of joint operating agreements, as well as the number of evening-published daily newspapers, has declined considerably in recent years, due to the ongoing consolidation of the newspaper industry as a whole, and the decline in readership and interest in evening newspapers in particular, which many observers have attributed to television and the internet, of which the former seems to be magnified by the presence of several 24-hour-a-day news operations on cable television. There have been 28 Joint Operating Agreements to date. The Chattanooga Times and the Chattanooga News-Free Press's joint operating agreement became the first to be terminated on August 27, 1966.

The Newspaper Preservation Act was touted as a relief measure to allow multiple newspapers competing in the same market to cut costs, thus ensuring that no one paper could have supremacy in the market by driving the other(s) out of business. However, mounting evidence suggests the passage of the Act was less about protecting editorial diversity within community newspaper markets than about inflating the profit margins of national newspaper chains. Large newspaper chains were able to sustain high profits while driving independent newspapers out of business, or forcing them to sell their stake to a chain. In fact, President Richard M. Nixon initially opposed the passage of the act (as had his predecessor, Lyndon B. Johnson) as being antithetical to the essential practices and character of free market capitalism.

He reversed himself upon receiving a letter from Richard E. Berlin, CEO of the Hearst chain of newspapers and magazines. In the 1969 letter, Berlin intimated that failure of the law to pass would carry political consequences and hinted that support from Nixon would conversely help the President and his allies. The Nixon Administration supported the Act's passage, and in the 1972 Presidential Campaign, every Hearst newspaper endorsed Nixon for reelection.

== Cities with newspaper joint operating agreements ==
- Albuquerque, New Mexico—The Albuquerque Journal (family owned), and The Albuquerque Tribune (owned by The E. W. Scripps Company) folded in 2008
- Anchorage, Alaska—Anchorage Daily News publishing, and Anchorage Times folded in 1978
- Birmingham, Alabama—The Birmingham News (owned by Advance Publications) publishing, and Birmingham Post-Herald (owned by The E. W. Scripps Company) folded in 2005
- Charleston, West Virginia—Charleston Gazette (family owned) and Charleston Daily Mail (owned by Media News Group, minority stake) merged into the Charleston Gazette-Mail in 2015.
- Chattanooga, Tennessee—Chattanooga Free-Press (previously the Chattanooga News-Free Press) and Chattanooga Times papers dissolved JOA in 1966, restored JOA in 1980; subsequently merged in 1999. Surviving paper named Chattanooga Times Free Press, merged paper maintains separate editorial pages
- Cincinnati, Ohio—The Cincinnati Enquirer (owned by Gannett) publishing and The Cincinnati Post/Kentucky Post (owned by The E.W. Scripps Company) (expired in 2007 with cessation of paper printing of The Post and its conversion to a website only publication on December 31, 2007)
- Columbus, Ohio—Columbus Dispatch (family owned) publishing, and Columbus Citizen-Journal (owned by The E. W. Scripps Company) folded in 1985
- Denver, Colorado—Denver Post (owned by Media News Group) and the Rocky Mountain News (owned by The E. W. Scripps Company) ended in 2009.
- Detroit, Michigan—Detroit Free Press (owned by Gannett, formerly owned by Knight-Ridder) and the Detroit News (owned by Media News Group, formerly owned by Gannett): ended December 28, 2025; both partners survived and exited voluntarily
- El Paso, Texas—El Paso Times publishing, and El Paso Herald-Post folded in 1997
- Evansville, Indiana—Evansville Courier, (owned by The E. W. Scripps Company, formerly family owned) and The Evansville Press (formerly owned by The E. W. Scripps Company) folded in 1998. Surviving paper named Evansville Courier & Press
- Fort Wayne, Indiana—Fort Wayne News-Sentinel (owned by Ogden News Group, formerly owned by The McClatchy Company, formerly owned by Knight-Ridder) and the Fort Wayne Journal-Gazette (family owned): News-Sentinel shut down 2020.
- Franklin, Pennsylvania and Oil City, Pennsylvania—Franklin News-Herald merged into Oil City Derrick in 1985
- Honolulu, Hawaii—Honolulu Advertiser (owned by Gannett) and Honolulu Star Bulletin (owned by Black Press of Victoria, British Columbia, Canada, formerly owned by Liberty Newspapers of Florida, previously owned by Gannett) 2000 JOA terminated, both published until 2010 when the two papers merged into the Honolulu Star-Advertiser
- Knoxville, Tennessee—Knoxville News Sentinel publishing, and Knoxville Journal became weekly in 1991
- Las Vegas, Nevada—Las Vegas Review-Journal (owned by News + Media Capital Group) and the Las Vegas Sun (owned by Greenspun Media Group): as of November 2005, the Sun publishes as a daily insert inside the R-J. Ended in 2026 when the Review-Journal stopped printing the Sun following a legal dispute. Both partners survived
- Miami, Florida—Miami Herald (owned by The McClatchy Company, formerly owned by Knight-Ridder) publishing, and Miami News (owned by Cox Enterprises) folded in 1988
- Nashville, Tennessee—The Tennessean (owned by Gannett) publishing, and Nashville Banner (family/local ownership) folded in 1998
- Pittsburgh, Pennsylvania—Pittsburgh Post-Gazette (owned by Block Communications) publishing, and The Pittsburgh Press (owned by The E. W. Scripps Company) folded in 1992
- Richmond, Virginia—Richmond Times-Dispatch and Richmond News-Leader both owned by Media General until the afternoon paper, the News-Leader, folded in 1992
- Salt Lake City, Utah—Deseret News (owned by the Deseret Management Corporation) and The Salt Lake Tribune (owned by The Salt Lake Tribune, Inc., a non-for-profit corporation) (On Oct. 26. 2020, The Tribune and the Deseret News released their decision to end the generations-long print partnership, as they both decided to reduce print publication to once a week. The JOA had been maintained by the jointly owned Newspaper Agency Company, LLC)
- San Francisco, California—San Francisco Chronicle (then owned by Chronicle Publishing Company) and San Francisco Examiner (formerly owned by The Hearst Corporation) 1999 JOA terminated when Hearst purchased the Chronicle and sold the Examiner. Both newspapers still publish, though the Examiner is now a free tabloid.
- Seattle, Washington—Seattle Post-Intelligencer (owned by The Hearst Corporation) and The Seattle Times (family owned)—(expired in 2009 with the cessation of the Post-Intelligencer's print edition)
- Shreveport, Louisiana—Shreveport Times publishing, and Shreveport Journal folded in 1991
- St. Louis, Missouri—Post-Dispatch (owned by Lee Enterprises, formerly owned by Pulitzer, Inc.) publishing, and Globe-Democrat (owned by Newhouse) ended when the Globe-Democrat was sold to Veritas Publishing Corp. in 1983; Globe-Democrat again operated independently until folding in October 1986.
- Tucson, Arizona—Arizona Daily Star (owned by Lee Enterprises) and the Tucson Citizen (owned by Gannett) (Citizen folded in 2009)
- Tulsa, Oklahoma—Tulsa World publishing, and Tulsa Tribune folded in 1992
- York, Pennsylvania— York Daily Record (owned by Gannett, formerly owned by Buckner News Alliance) and The York Dispatch (owned by Gannett, formerly owned by Media News Group and then Buckner News Alliance) JOA expired 2024

== See also ==
- Stephen Barnett—law professor who campaigned against the Newspaper Preservation Act of 1970
