= The Detroit News =

Conservative newspaper in Detroit

- Type: Daily newspaper
- Format: Broadsheet
- Owner: USA Today Co.
- Publisher: Gary Miles
- Editor: Gary Miles
- Managing editor: Kevin J. Hardy
- Founded: 1873; 153 years ago
- Headquarters: 6001 Cass Ave. Detroit, Michigan; 48202
- Circulation: 51,595 (as of 2022)
- ISSN: 1055-2715
- OCLC number: 9611687
- Website: detroitnews.com

The Detroit News is an American conservative daily newspaper published in Detroit, Michigan, United States. It is owned by USA Today Co., which also owns the main historical rival the Detroit Free Press. The two newspapers operated under a joint operating agreement from 1989 until 2025.

The paper began in 1873, when it rented space in the rival Detroit Free Press's building. The News absorbed the Detroit Tribune on February 1, 1919, the Detroit Journal on July 21, 1922, and on November 7, 1960, it bought and closed the faltering Detroit Times. However, it retained the Times building, which it used as a printing plant until 1975, when a new facility opened in Sterling Heights. The Times building was demolished in 1978. The street in downtown Detroit where the Times building once stood is still called "Times Square." The Evening News Association, owner of The News, merged with Gannett in 1985.

In 1989, the paper entered into a one hundred year joint operating agreement with the rival Free Press, combining business operations while keeping separate editorial staffs. The combined company is called the Detroit Media Partnership (DMP). The Free Press moved into The News building in 1998 and until May 7, 2006, the two published a single joint weekend edition.

The Detroit News has won three Pulitzer Prizes.

== History ==
Former Detroit News logo, used for marketing

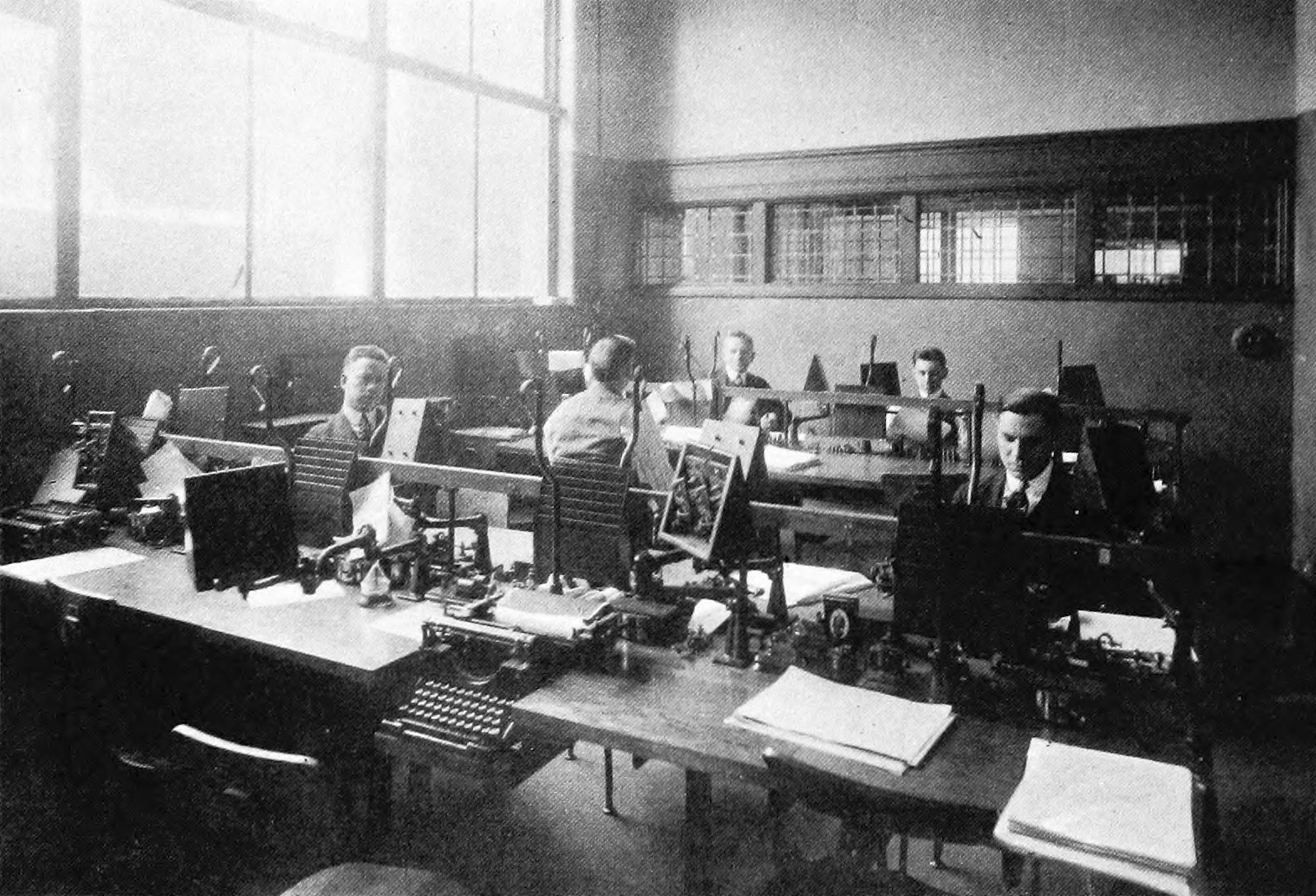
Telegraphic dispatches to the paper exceeded 75,000 words a day in 1918.

The Detroit News was founded by James E. Scripps, who, in turn, was the older half-brother and one-time partner of Edward W. Scripps. The paper's eventual success, however, is largely credited to Scripps' son-in-law, George Gough Booth, who came aboard at the request of his wife's father. Booth went on to construct Michigan's largest newspaper empire, founding the independent Booth Newspapers chain (now owned by S.I. Newhouse's Advance Publications) with his two brothers.

The Detroit News building was erected in 1917. It was designed by architect Albert Kahn, who included a faux-stone concrete building with large street-level arches to admit light. The arches along the east and south side of the building were bricked-in for protection after the 12th Street Riot in 1967. The bricked-in arches on the east and south ends of the building were reopened during renovations required when the Free Press relocated its offices there 20 years later.

In 1931, The Detroit News made history when it bought a three-place Pitcairn PCA-2 auto-gyro as a camera aircraft that could take off and land in restricted places and semi-hover for photos. It was the ancestor of today's well-known news helicopter. In 1935 a single Lockheed Model 9 Orion was purchased and modified by Lockheed as a news camera plane for The Detroit News. To work in that role, a pod was built into the frontal leading edge of the right-wing about eight feet (2.4 m) out from the fuselage. This pod had a glass dome on the front and a mounted camera. To aim the camera the pilot was provided with a primitive grid-like gun sight on his windshield.

Deb Price's column in The Detroit News, which debuted in 1992, was the first syndicated national column in American mainstream media that was specifically focused on gay life.

On July 13, 1995, Newspaper Guild employees of the Detroit Free Press and The News along with pressmen, printers and Teamsters, working for the "Detroit Newspapers" distribution arm, went on strike. Approximately half of the staffers crossed the picket line before the unions ended their strike in February 1997. The strike was resolved in court three years later, with the journalists' union losing its unfair labor practices case on appeal. Still, the weakened unions remain active at the paper, representing a majority of the employees under their jurisdiction.

On August 3, 2005, Gannett announced that it would sell The News to MediaNews Group and purchase the Free Press from the Knight Ridder company. With this move, Gannett became the managing partner in the papers' joint operating agreement. On May 7, 2006, the combined Sunday Detroit News and Free Press was replaced by a stand-alone Sunday Free Press. On December 16, 2008, Detroit Media Partnership announced a plan to limit weekday home delivery for both dailies to Thursday and Friday only. On other weekdays the paper sold at newsstands would be reduced to about 32 pages, and redesigned. This arrangement went into effect on March 30, 2009.

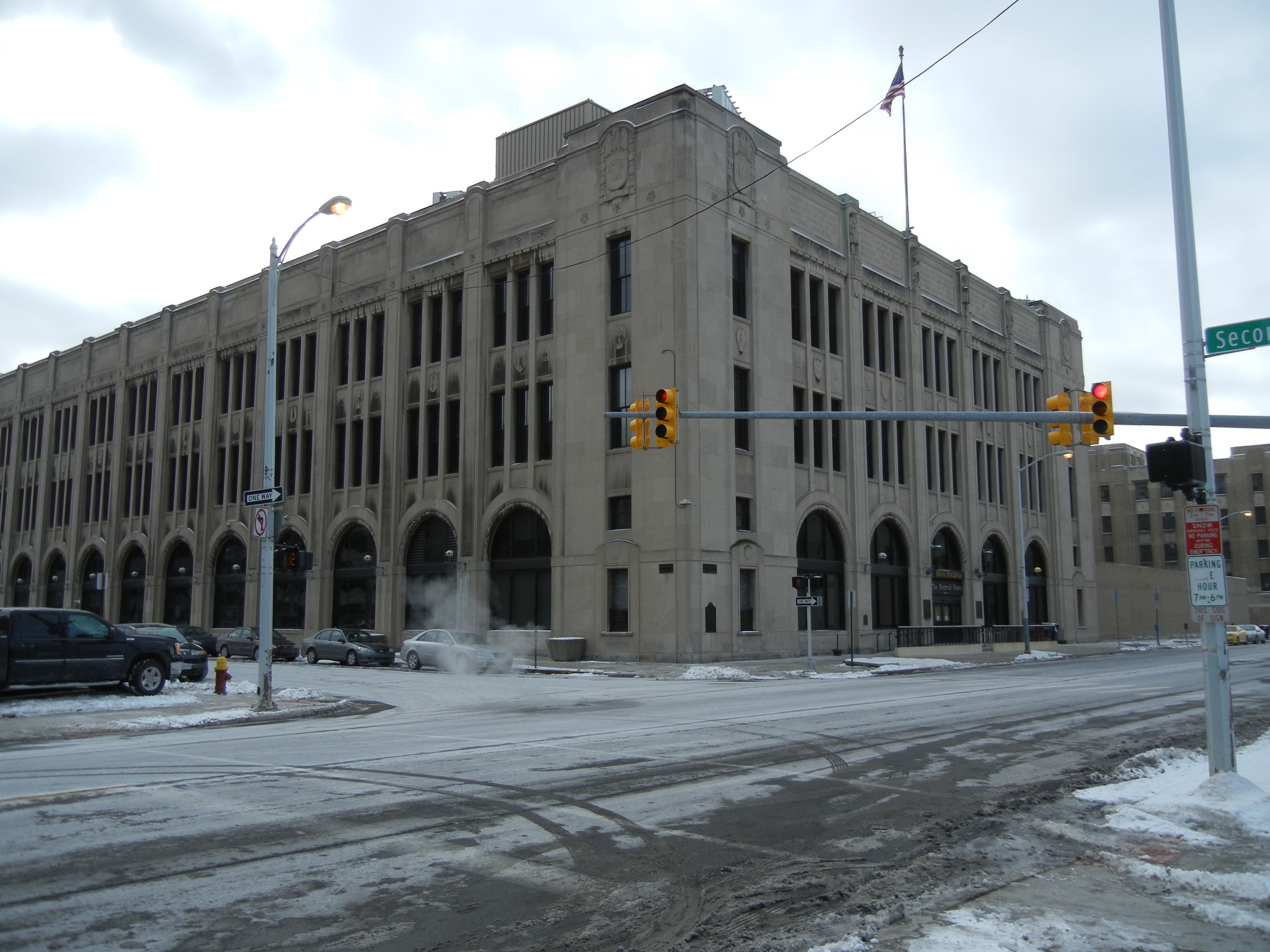
The Detroit News Complex was the newspaper's home from 1917 to 2014.

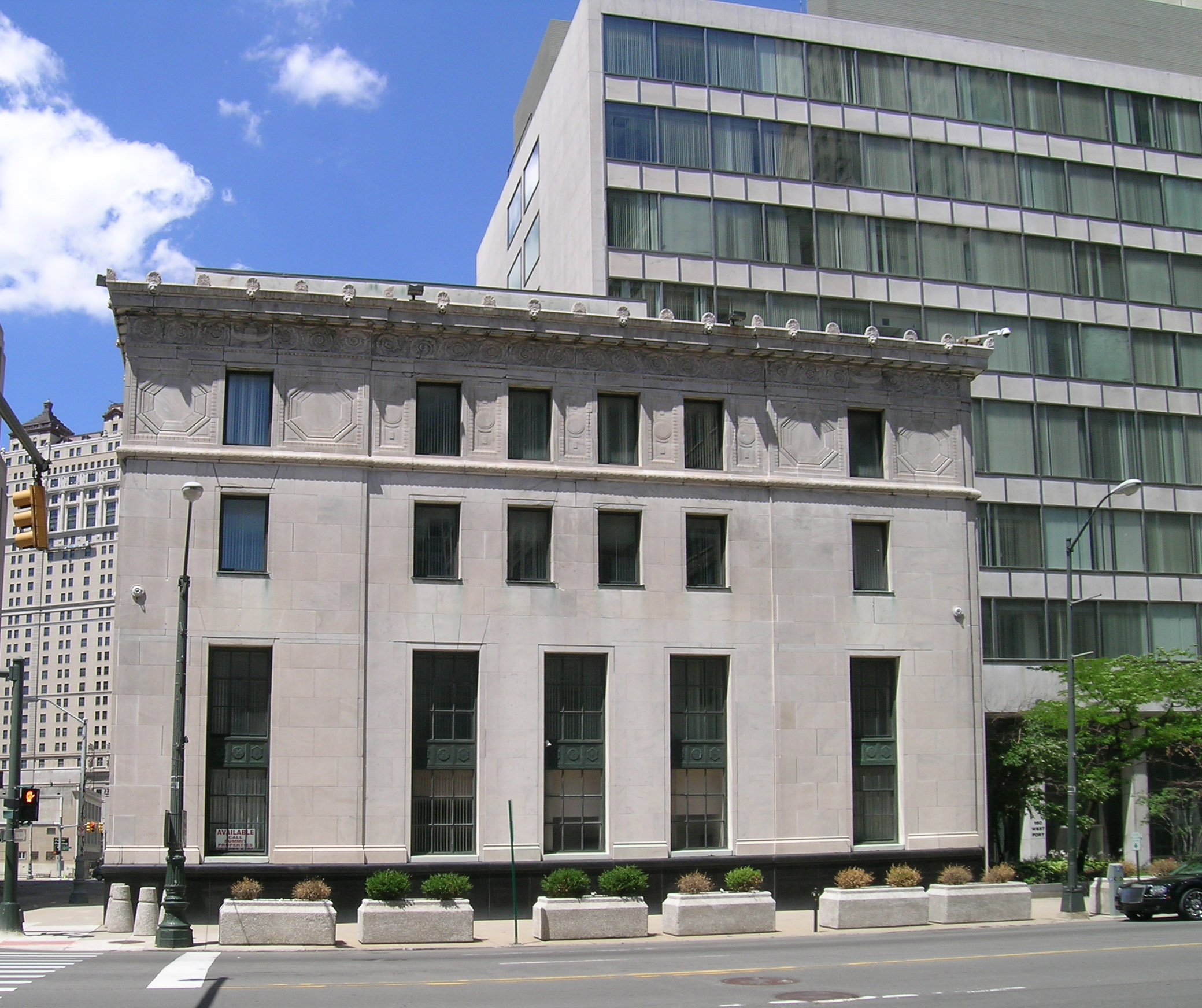
The Federal Reserve building was the home of The Detroit News as well as the Free Press offices from 2014 to 2024.

In February 2014, the DMP announced its offices along with those of The News and the Free Press would move from the West Lafayette building to six floors in both the old and new sections of the former Federal Reserve building at 160 West Fort Street. The partnership expected to place signs on the exterior similar to those on the former offices. The move took place October 24–27, 2014.

In December 2024, The Detroit News moved to the historic Albert Kahn-designed former Cadillac showroom at 6001 Cass Avenue, which was built in 1920.

In January 2025, Gannett (now USA Today Co.) announced that the Sterling Heights plant that printed The News and Free Press would close after the production run August 3, and printing would move to other Gannett facilities.

In June 2025, it was subsequently announced that the Detroit Media Partnership would be dissolved, with MediaNews Group and Gannett respectively operating the Detroit News and Free Press independently effective December 28, 2025. The Detroit News announced that it would reinstate a Sunday edition beginning January 18, 2026, and the paper also began to collaborate with its sister publications The Macomb Daily and The Oakland Press. The Sunday edition was later delayed indefinitely. On January 26, 2026, USA Today Co. announced that it would acquire The Detroit News, putting both papers under common ownership. The sale was completed on January 31.

== Politics ==
The News describes itself as "a conservative newspaper since its founding in 1873." In 1958, The News described itself as consistently conservative on economic issues and consistently liberal on civil liberties issues. It has never endorsed a Democratic candidate for president, and has only failed to endorse a Republican presidential candidate six times: twice during the Franklin D. Roosevelt era; in 2004, when it did not endorse George W. Bush for re-election; in 2016, when it endorsed Libertarian Party nominee Gary Johnson rather than Republican nominee Donald Trump, and in 2020 and 2024, when it continued to withhold its endorsement from Trump and did not endorse a candidate.

== Staff ==
The staff of The Detroit News includes editorial page columnists Nolan Finley, Kaitlyn Buss and Bankole Thompson; food critic Melody Baetens; sports columnists Bob Wojnowski and John Niyo; sportswriters Angelique Chengelis, Tony Paul, Chris McCosky, Rod Beard, Nolan Bianchi, Ted Kulfan and James Hawkins; auto critic Henry Payne and business columnist Daniel Howes. Previous staff members include sportswriter David Goricki.

The staff also includes metro reporter Robert Snell, who was named Michigan Journalist of the Year in 2014, 2018, and 2020 by the Detroit chapter of the Society of Professional Journalists.

=== Former staff ===
- Jack Berry, sportswriter from 1971 to 1993
- Jerry Green, sportswriter from 1963 to 2023
- Mike O'Hara sportswriter from 1967-2008

== Awards ==
- 2017 Sigma Delta Chi Award Christine MacDonald
- 1994 Pulitzer Prize for Beat Reporting Eric Freedman and Jim Mitzelfeld
- 1982 Pulitzer Prize for Public Service The Detroit News
- 1977 Penney-Missouri Award for General Excellence.
- 1942 Pulitzer Prize for Photography Milton Brooks (the first winner of a photojournalism Pulitzer)

== See also ==
- Media in Detroit
- Warren T. Brookes
