= Pittsburgh in the American Civil War =

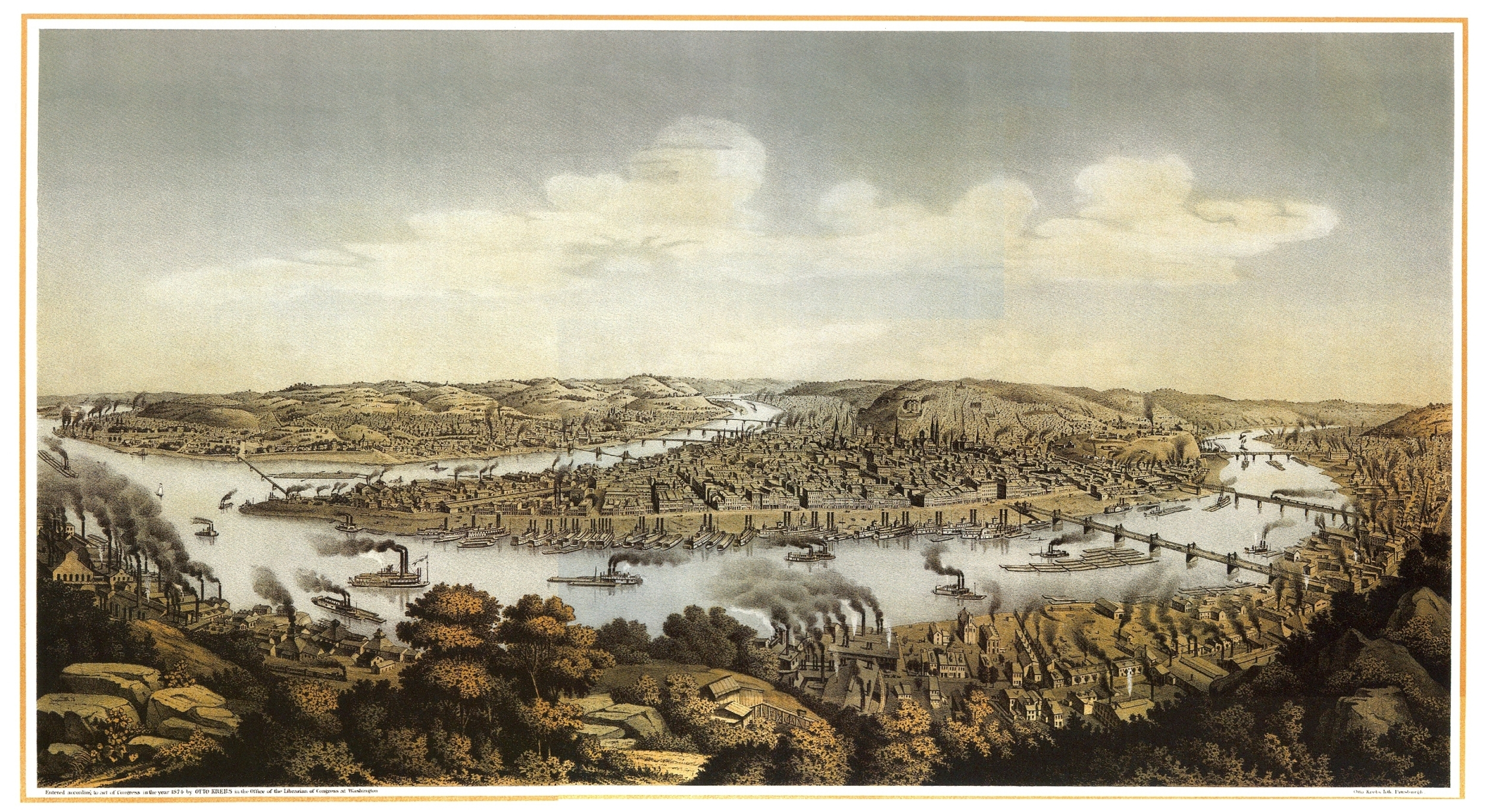
An 1874 lithograph showing Pittsburgh from Mount Washington

Pittsburgh, Pennsylvania, was a thriving and important city during the American Civil War, and provided a significant source of personnel, war materiel, armament, ammunition, and supplies to the Union Army. Situated at the confluence of the Monongahela, Allegheny and Ohio rivers, Pittsburgh was an important transportation hub for both riverine and rail transport, as well as overland via its system of roads.

== Production of material ==
The antebellum iron industry in Pittsburgh had thrived, fueled by access to coal, iron ore, and other raw materials, as well as transportation routes to get the iron to markets. In 1859, the Clinton and Soho iron furnaces introduced coke-fired smelting to the region. Within three years, the growing needs of the military effort during the Civil War had boosted the city's economy with increased production of iron and armaments, especially at the Allegheny Arsenal and the Fort Pitt Foundry. Arms manufacture included ironclad warships and the world's first 21" heavy artillery gun. By war's end, over one-half of the steel and more than one-third of all U.S. glass was produced in Pittsburgh.

During the war, Pittsburgh's heavy industry provided significant quantities of weapons and ammunition. The Fort Pitt Foundry made mammoth iron castings for giant siege howitzers and mortars, among the largest guns in the world. One of the largest was a 20-inch bore Rodman Gun, a large black powder, smoothbore, muzzle-loading coastal defense gun. The foundry produced 1,193 guns (15 percent of the total U.S. wartime artillery production) and almost 200,000 artillery projectiles. Other prominent Pittsburgh area factories included Singer, Nimick and Co. (maker of 3" Ordnance rifles) and Smith, Park and Co., which produced more than 300,000 projectiles. Pittsburgh industries collectively manufactured 10 percent of the total U.S. wartime production of artillery rounds.

The Allegheny Arsenal was the primary military manufacturing facility for U.S. Army accoutrements, as well as saddles and other cavalry equipment. In addition, the sprawling factory produced as many as 40,000 bullets and cartridges every day (more than 14 million per year), supplying between 5 and 10 percent of the Army's annual small arms ammunition requirements. A significant explosion on the afternoon of September 17, 1862 (coincidentally on the same day as the Battle of Antietam in central Maryland), killed 78 factory workers, mostly young women.

Five Ellet-class rams were converted from civilian towboats at Pittsburgh. In addition, four ironclads were built from the keel up—the USS Manayunk, Marietta, Sandusky, and Umpqua. Pittsburgh's rolling mills supplied the armor for many of the ironclads that were built in New York City and Philadelphia for the Union Navy.

The city's 110-year run of hosting a major stock exchange can be traced to the oil traded at Pittsburgh during the war with the creation of Thurston's Oil Exchange on Fourth Avenue, downtown.

== Defending Pittsburgh ==
Both Morgan's Raid from the west and Jones-Imboden Raid from the south came within a day's march of the city before being captured or forced to retreat.

Concerned that the Confederate Army might target Pittsburgh for invasion, the U.S. War Department established the Department of the Monongahela to provide a formal Federal military presence in Western Pennsylvania during the Gettysburg campaign, with departmental headquarters in Pittsburgh. The Army dispatched Maj. Gen. William T. H. Brooks to organize the defenses of Pittsburgh. Brooks authorized the construction of several miles of earthworks and a series of small forts to control access to the city. He suspended liquor sales, and put the citizenry to work digging trenches and erecting forts. Bars and saloons were asked to close but many refused.

Among these bastions was Fort Robert Smalls, a redoubt built by free blacks on McGuire's Hill at the mouth of Becks Run in Arlington Heights. Another of these emergency fortifications was the circular earthwork known as Fort Laughlin, constructed by the employees of Jones and Laughlin Steel on Ormsby's Hill, now part of Arlington Park on Arlington Avenue. It was also known as Fort McKinley or Fort Ormsby. Concurrent with Fort Laughlin, Jones and Laughlin Steel employees constructed Fort Jones, named for the mill's co-owner, Benjamin Franklin Jones . Fort Jones occupied the top of a hill in Mount Oliver. It was sometimes known as Fort Jackson, in honor of Brig. Gen. Conrad Feger Jackson, killed in the Battle of Fredericksburg, Virginia, in December 1862. There was also Fort Black, in Greenfield.

== Notable leaders from Pittsburgh ==
The greater Pittsburgh area was the birthplace or long-time residence of several Union army and navy officers, as well as some leading politicians of the era.

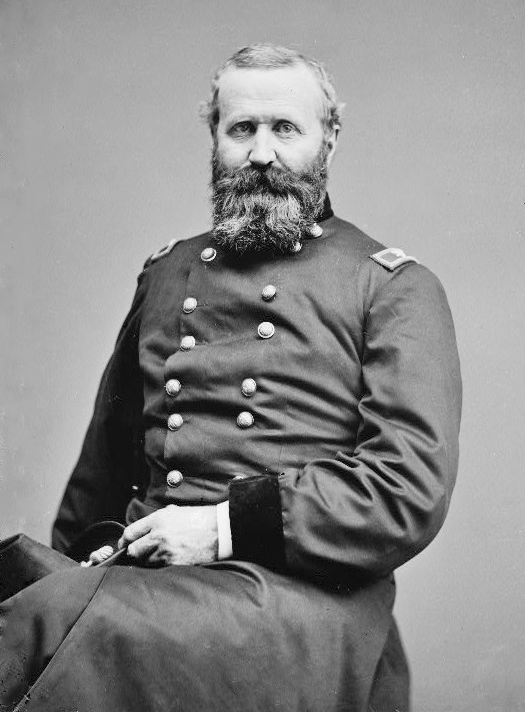
Bvt. Maj. Gen.
Alexander Hays
USA

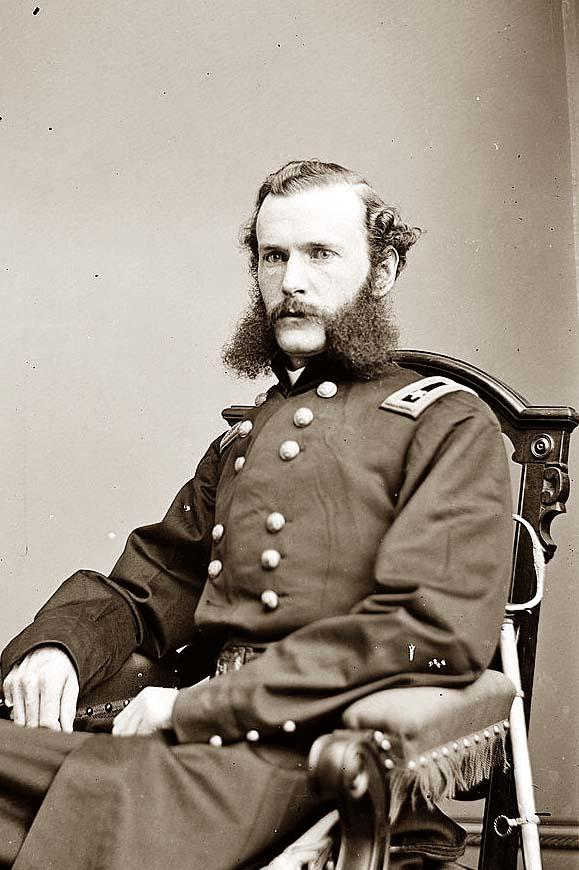
Maj. Gen.
Francis J. Herron
USA

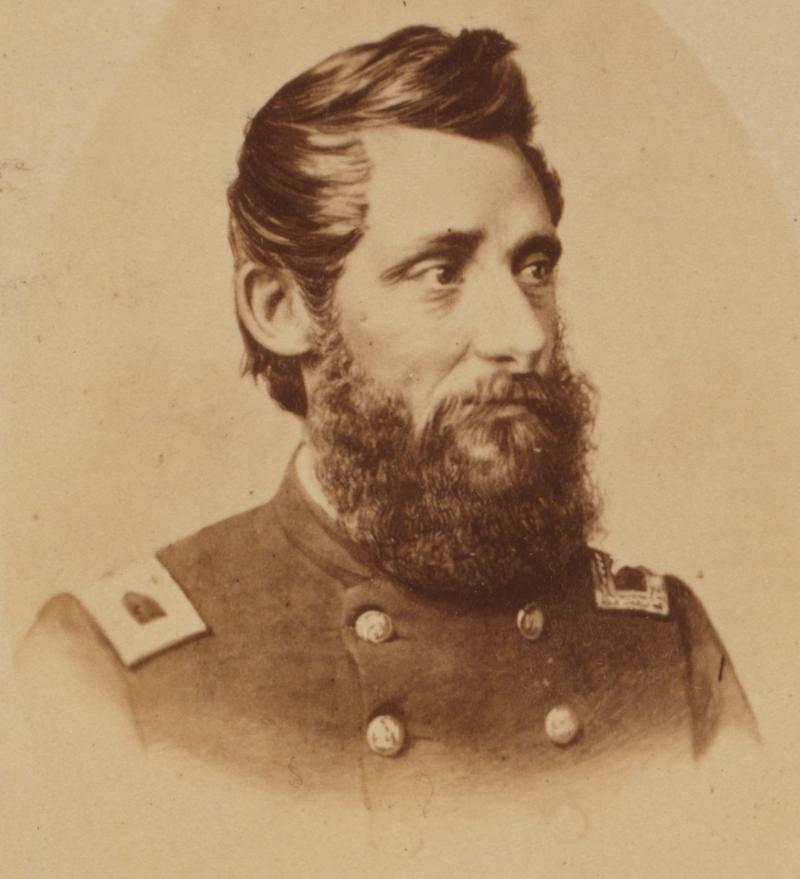
Brig. Gen.
Benjamin Grierson
USA

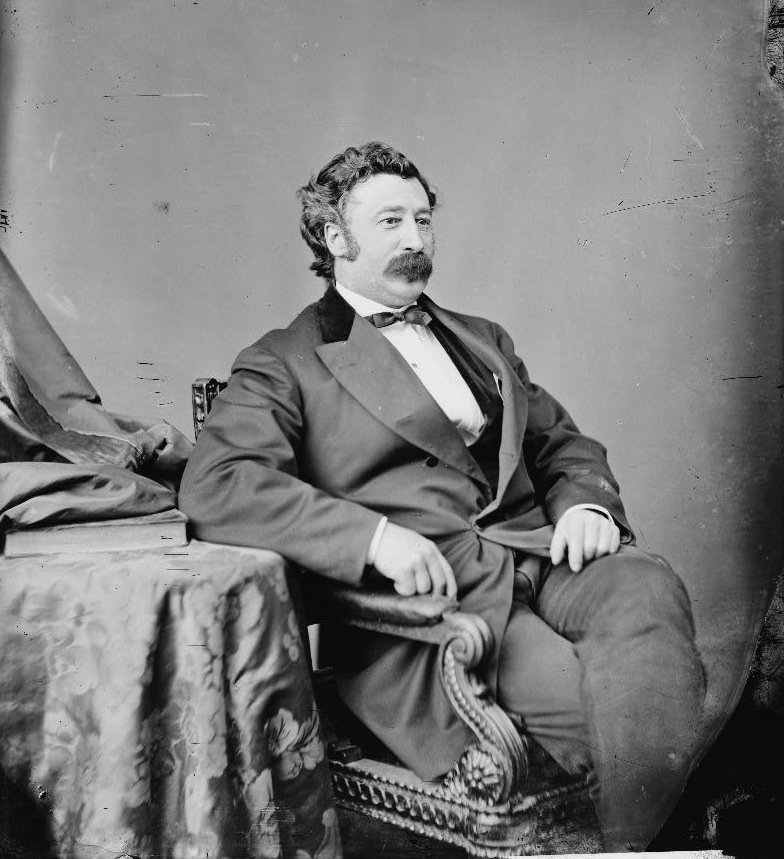
Brig. Gen.
James S. Negley
USA

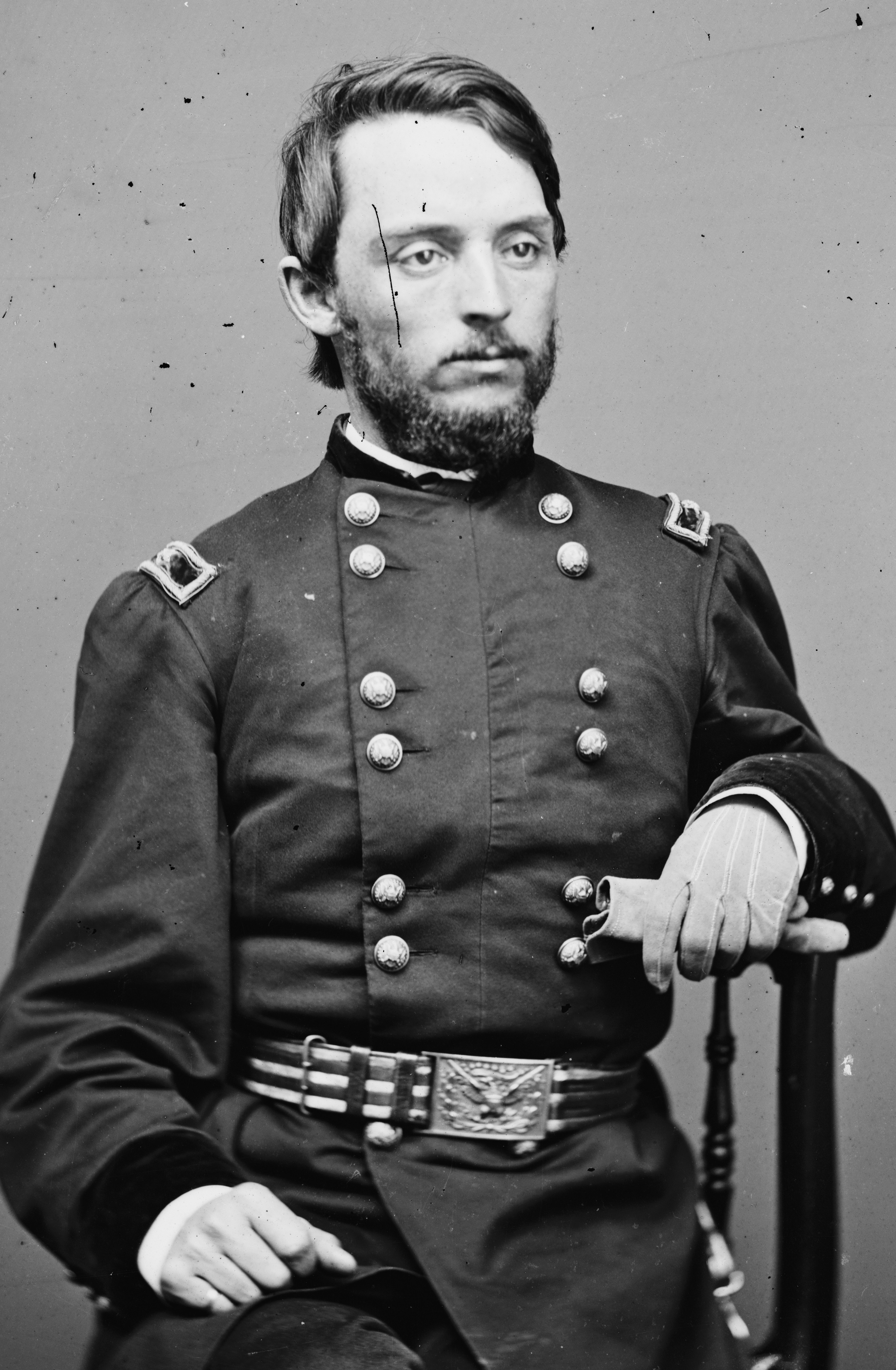
Brig. Gen.
John M. Corse
USA

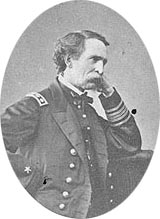
Cmdr.
Alexander Murray
USN

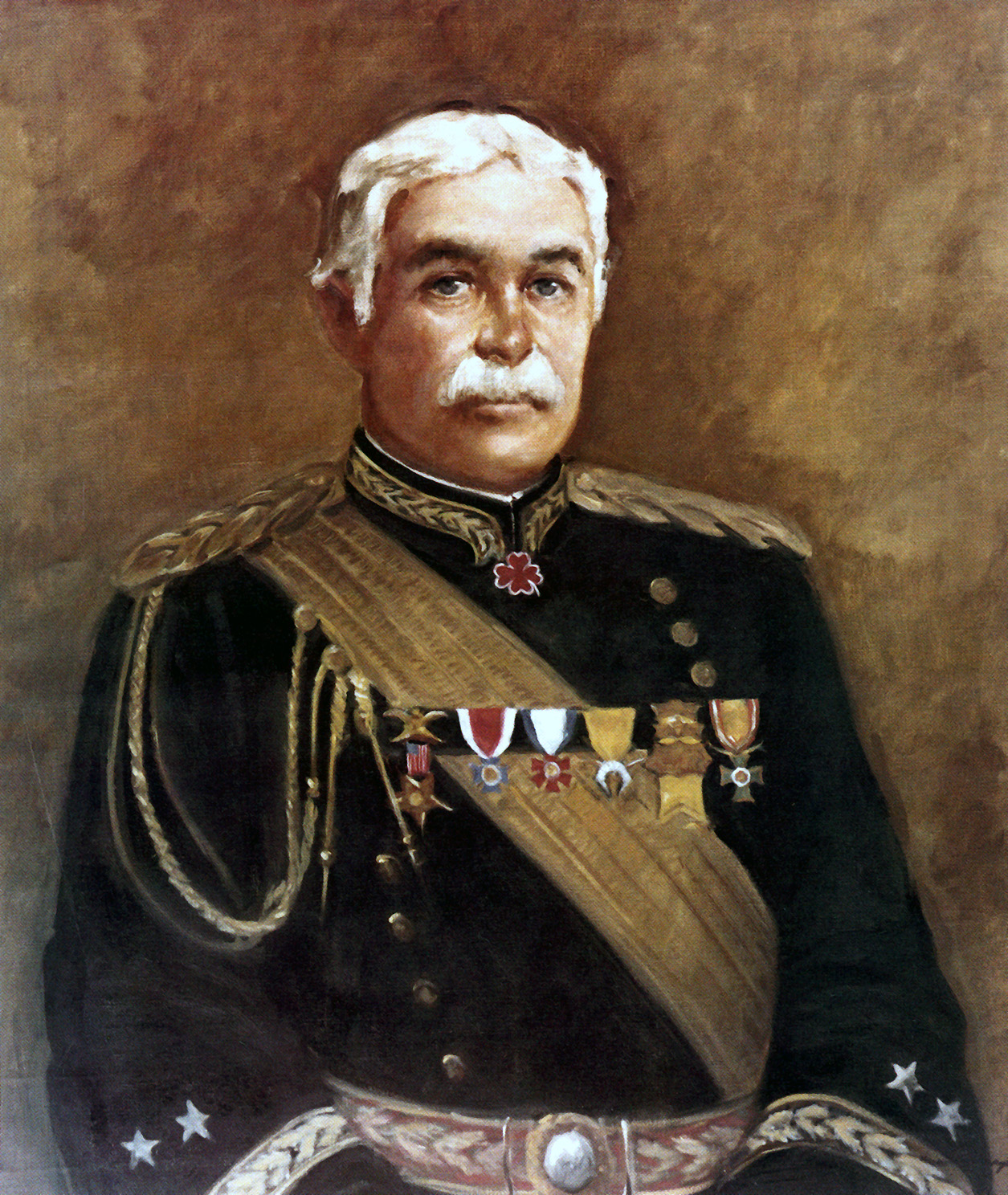
Bvt. Brig. Gen.
Samuel Young
USA

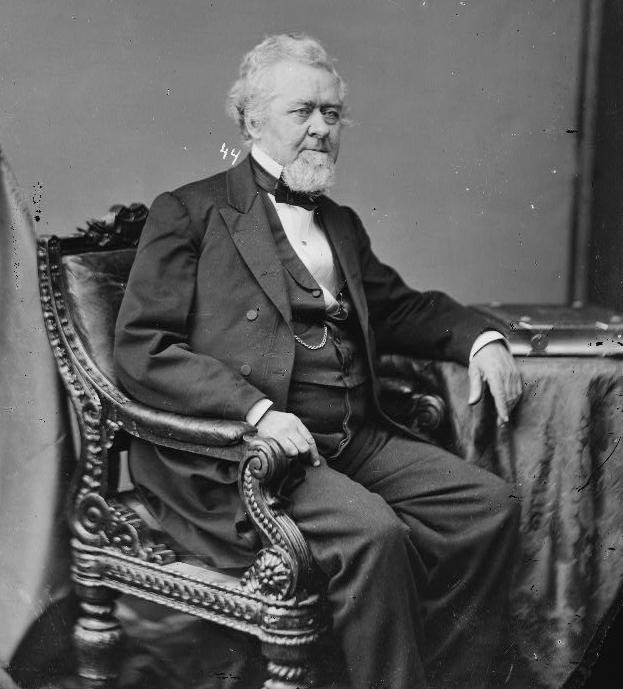
Rep.
Thomas Williams
USA

Other important personalities of the Civil War born in the immediate Pittsburgh area included Col. Daniel Leasure, Congressman Robert McKnight, industrialist William Metcalf, and Brig. Gen. Thomas A. Rowley.

Among the recipients of the Medal of Honor for gallantry in action during the war were Alexander Kelly, a free black who fought in the 6th U.S.C.T.

The mayors of Pittsburgh during the Civil War were George Wilson (1860–1862), Benair C. Sawyer (1862–1864), and James Lowry, Jr. (1864–1866).

== Civil War attractions in Pittsburgh ==
The Soldiers and Sailors National Military Museum and Memorial is a National Register of Historic Places landmark. It is the largest memorial in the United States dedicated solely to honoring all branches of military veterans and service personnel.

In 2014 a small park was proposed on Mount Washington overlooking Saw Mill Run where remains of earthwork defenses can still be seen.

The National Aviary is the site of the Civil War Western State Penitentiary, built in 1826, and torn down in 1882. This was famous as a concentration camp for prisoners of war. The exterior resembled a Norman castle, with walls three feet thick, laid out as an octagon, resembling a wagon wheel. The inmates labored in solitary confinement, working at sewing clothes and uniforms (female inmates) and making shoes (male inmates), all in silence with minimal human contact. The penitentiary contained 190 solitary confinement cells, each measuring eight by twelve feet.

== See also ==
- Pennsylvania in the American Civil War
- History of Pittsburgh, Pennsylvania
