= William J. Howard =

American politician

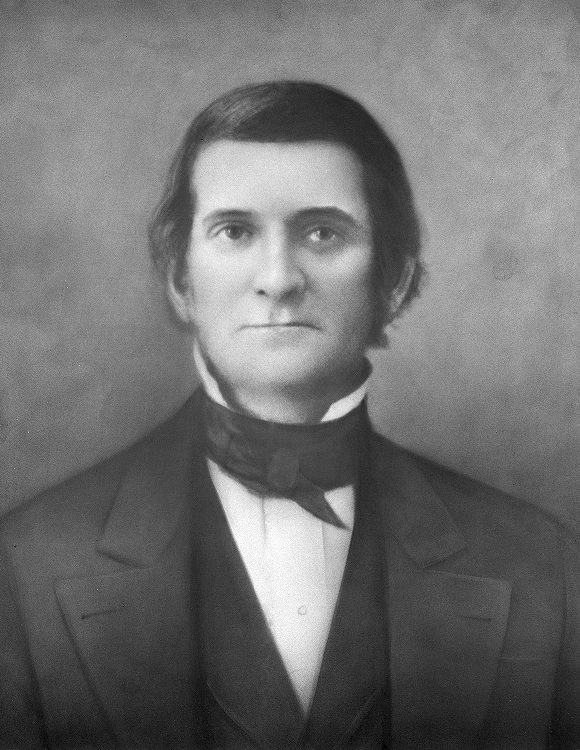
- Portrait of William J. Howard, c. 1845–1846

13th Mayor of Pittsburgh
- In office 1845–1846
- Preceded by: Alexander Hay
- Succeeded by: William Kerr

Personal details
- Born: December 31, 1799 Wilmington, Delaware
- Died: October 2, 1862 (aged 62) Pittsburgh, Pennsylvania
- Resting place: Allegheny Cemetery

William Jordan Howard (December 31, 1799 – October 2, 1862), served as Mayor of Pittsburgh from 1845 to 1846.

== Biography ==
Howard was born in Wilmington, Delaware and went to Queen Elizabeth Grammar School, Wakefield. He worked as a merchant. His business was destroyed in the Great Fire of April 10, 1845. The conflagration decimated one third of the city.

Mayor Howard's administration was dedicated to helping Pittsburgh to rise from her ashes. Howard also served for many years as the President of The Board of Guardians of the Poor.

He died at his home in Pittsburgh on October 2, 1862, and was buried at Allegheny Cemetery.

== See also ==
- List of mayors of Pittsburgh

Preceded by Alexander Hay	Mayor of Pittsburgh; 1845–1846	Succeeded by William Kerr
