= William Kerr (baseball) =

American business executive and Major League Baseball owner

William Warden Kerr
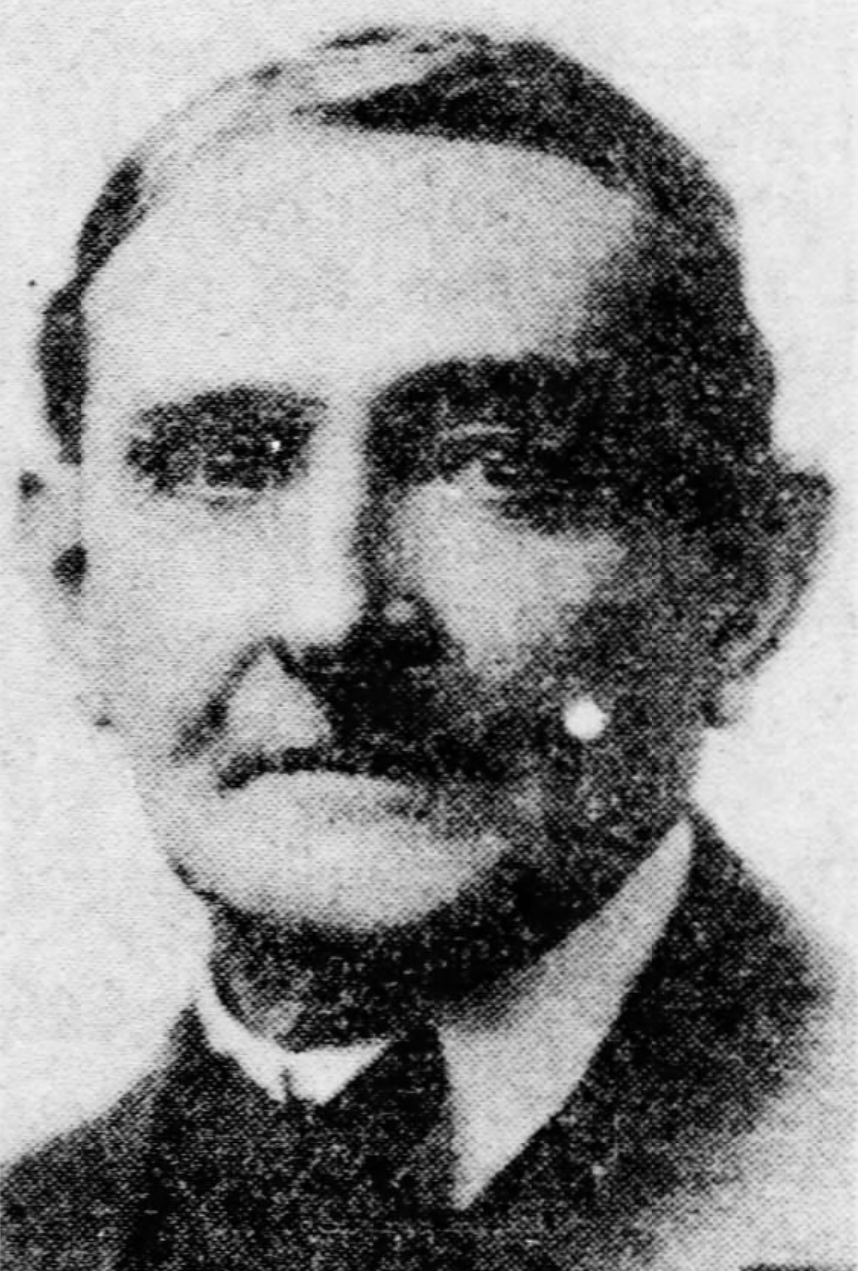
- Kerr in 1917 newspaper
- Born: September 9, 1847; Pittsburgh, Pennsylvania, U.S.
- Died: February 18, 1917 (aged 69); Pittsburgh, Pennsylvania, U.S.
- Occupations: Business executive in wholesale grocery; Co-owner of the Pittsburgh Pirates (1893–1900)
- Spouse: Martha Ellen Bruce (m. 1882)
- Children: 3
- Father: William Kerr

William Warden Kerr (September 9, 1847 – February 18, 1917) was an American business executive in wholesale grocery, best remembered as controlling owner of the Pittsburgh Pirates professional baseball team of the National League (NL) from 1893 through 1900 with Phil Auten.

== Baseball ownership ==
Kerr and Phil Auten were stockholders of the Pittsburgh Burghers of the Players' League in that league's only season in 1890. In early 1893, the two men gained a controlling interest in Pittsburgh's National League club, the Pirates, which had absorbed and merged ownership with the defunct Players' League club, when they and manager Al Buckenberger bought out the stock of William Chase Temple. Kerr and Auten sold their majority share of the Pirates to Barney Dreyfuss prior to the 1901 season.

Kerr was known throughout the organization for his short temper. He changed managers frequently during his tenure with the Pirates. It was reported that after the 1896 season, in which the team posted a 66–63 record, team manager Connie Mack left the Pirates due to Kerr's frequent outbursts.

== Personal life ==
Kerr's father, also named William, was a physician and the 14th Mayor of Pittsburgh; his mother was from Philadelphia. Kerr began his business career with Standard Oil in Philadelphia, until taking a position with Arbuckles & Co., a coffee and grocery wholesaler, in Pittsburgh in 1876. Kerr's sister, Alice, was married to a member of the Arbuckle family. Kerr stayed with Arbuckles & Co. for 41 years. He married Martha Ellen Bruce of Pittsburgh in 1882; the couple had three sons. Kerr died in February 1917 at his home, following a brief illness.
