= USS Nero =

Collier of the United States Navy

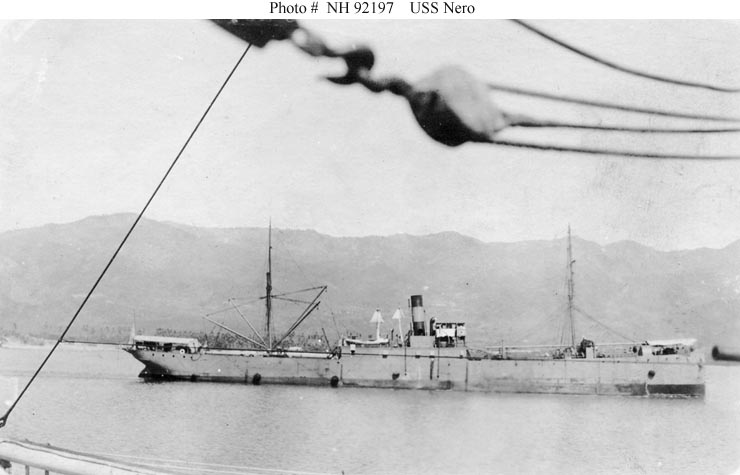
- USS Nero prior to World War I

History

United States
- Name: USS Nero
- Namesake: Nero
- Launched: 8 December 1894
- Acquired: 30 June 1898
- Commissioned: 8 June 1898
- Decommissioned: 12 September 1921
- Fate: Sold 29 July 1922 to A. Bercovich and Company, Oakland, California

General characteristics
- Type: Collier
- Displacement: 6,360 long tons (6,460 t)
- Length: 320 ft (98 m)
- Beam: 41 ft (12 m)
- Draft: 20 ft (6.1 m)
- Speed: 9 kn (17 km/h)
- Complement: 80
- Armament: 4 × 6-pounder guns

USS Nero (AC–17), a steel steam collier, was launched in 1894 as the steamer Whitgift by J.L. Thompson and Sons, Sunderland, England. The vessel was purchased on 30 June 1898 from McCondray and Co. at San Francisco and commissioned on 8 June 1898.

== Service ==
=== Spanish–American War ===
Acquired by the United States Navy for service as a collier and supply ship, Nero was part of the first mobile Fleet Train, organized to meet logistic demands created by far-flung U.S. Naval Operations in the Spanish–American War. Following conversion at Mare Island Navy Yard, the ship departed San Francisco on 23 June 1898 for the Philippines, in company with the monitor Monadnock. Sailing by way of Honolulu and Guam, the collier arrived Manila on 14 August and remained there supporting U.S. forces occupying the Philippines until departing on 4 October on a coaling voyage, steaming to Taku, China and Nagasaki, Japan, before returning to Cavite on 20 November.

Nero sailed for home on 1 December and arrived Mare Island on 7 January 1899, where she was placed out of commission.

=== Postwar service ===
Nero recommissioned on 10 April and sailed five days later for the Hawaiian Islands for deep sea soundings, then steamed via Guam to the Philippines arriving Cavite on 4 August. There she coaled various naval vessels until sailing on 9 September for Yokohama to continue deep sea sounding. The collier got under way for the west coast on 24 September, stopping at Guam and Honolulu and arriving Mare Island on 15 February 1900. During this voyage she took a sounding in the area of the Challenger Deep, recording a depth of 5,269 fathoms (31,614 ft; 9,636 m), the greatest depth recorded at that time. She decommissioned on 20 May.

Placed in service on 4 October, Nero departed on 23 October from Mare Island on her third voyage to the Far East. Steaming to Yokohama by way of Honolulu from 23 October to 27 November; she then proceeded to Cavite on 12 December to supply American forces putting down the Philippine insurrection. On 9 February 1901, the collier sailed for the United States, taking the long way home by way of Ceylon, Suez, Algiers, Malta, and Gibraltar, and docking at Norfolk on 16 April. The ship departed Norfolk on 11 June on a long coaling voyage down the east coast of South America, returning on 12 December. Two months later, she sailed again for Latin America, this time going around Cape Horn to supply the Pacific outpost of Tutuila, Samoa. Returning to the States on 29 July, Nero underwent overhaul at New York and then sailed on 12 October for a return voyage to the Philippines. Once again steaming through the Mediterranean, the Suez Canal and the Indian Ocean, the well-traveled collier arrived at Cavite on 21 December, where she remained for one month, giving needed logistic support, and then returned the way she had come, putting into Boston on 28 April 1903.

Nero sailed on 25 July for the Pacific. Rounding Cape Horn once again, the collier made intermittent stops along the coast of South America and arrived San Francisco on 22 February 1904. She remained in the Pacific, making one voyage to Honolulu and then Kiska in the Aleutians from 14 April to 22 August, then departed Mare Island to return around Cape Horn to Norfolk, arriving on 2 March 1905.

Serving as an Atlantic Fleet auxiliary for the next six years, the collier cruised the east coast from Boston to Rio de Janeiro, decommissioning twice for brief periods of upkeep – first from 23 June 1906 to 1 February 1907 and then again from 3 January 1910 to 16 September 1911 – and coaling many ships of the Atlantic Fleet and South American Patrol Force in her valuable service to the fleet. On 1 August 1906 in route from Norfolk to Newport with a load of coal she ran aground on the south side of Long Island, New York, in dense fog. She was refloated later by tugs. She ran aground on Brenton's Reef after leaving Newport, Rhode Island 1 July 1909. Refloated 2 August by the Arbuckle Wrecking Company and taken to Newport for temporary repairs before being towed to the Brooklyn Navy Yard 21–22 December for permanent repairs. On 21 October, the collier departed Norfolk to return to the Pacific. Steaming once more around Cape Horn, she arrived San Diego on 29 January 1912 and the next month began supply operations off Mexico. Following a voyage to the North Pacific from 20 May to 23 November, visiting various ports in Alaska and the Aleutians, Nero continued cruising the eastern Pacific, making two brief trips to Pearl Harbor from 5 February to 6 March 1913 and 31 March to 8 May, until decommissioning on 31 July 1913 at Puget Sound Navy Yard.

=== World War I ===
Nero was once again placed in full service on 29 April 1914 and, three days later, resumed her logistic operations, cruising from Bremerton to La Paz. Assigned to the Pacific Fleet on 5 June 1915, the collier continued her operations on into 1917. On 19 July, she departed San Francisco for New York, to meet the demand for auxiliaries in the Atlantic due to the increasing scope of U.S. naval operations in World War I. Passing through the Panama Canal on 2 August, Nero arrived Norfolk on the 18th. She sailed for Europe via the Azores on 11 September and shortly after her arrival at Queenstown, Ireland on 13 October, was assigned to duty with the newly formed Naval Overseas Transportation Service.

Based at Cardiff, Wales, Nero began operations with the Army's Cross Channel Service, transporting coal from English ports to France until 25 February 1919, subject to German submarine attacks and the hazardous English Channel weather. She then sailed for Norfolk, arriving on 17 March. After unloading, the collier proceeded to New York on 22 April, and then cruised the east coast for the next month, carrying cargo to New England and Middle Atlantic ports until arriving Charlestown on 22 May for extensive overhaul. There she remained for over a year, undergoing complete repair and alteration. On 14 August 1920, she sailed to Hampton Roads to load cargo and then steamed to the Caribbean to coal U.S. naval vessels at Guantanamo Bay and Santo Domingo, returning to Norfolk on 28 September.

Nero departed Norfolk for the last time on 5 December 1920 to return to the Pacific and her homeport of San Francisco. Proceeding by way of the Panama Canal, the veteran collier arrived Mare Island on 7 February 1921. She departed on her last voyage the next day, steaming first to Pearl Harbor and then to Tutuila. On her return to Pearl Harbor, she was called to aid Colonel and Mrs. Meng, who were living on the remote, uninhabited Palmyra Atoll, manning a copra plantation. The couple's supplies had nearly run out, and they were in desperate need of food and clothing to continue their work. Nero stopped and gave assistance, before returning (by way of Pearl Harbor) to San Francisco, on 6 June 1921.

Nero decommissioned on 12 September 1921. In February 1922, Nero was sold for scrap to Philip C. Lowry of San Francisco, California, for $10,125.
