= James Thomson (Pittsburgh mayor) =

American politician

11th Mayor of Pittsburgh
- In office 1841–1842
- Preceded by: William W. Irwin
- Succeeded by: Alexander Hay

Personal details
- Born: December 18, 1790 Franklin County, Pennsylvania
- Died: August 10, 1876 (aged 85)

James Thomson (December 18, 1790 – August 10, 1876), served as Mayor of Pittsburgh from 1841 to 1842.

== Early life ==
Thomson was born in Franklin County, Pennsylvania, in 1790 and arrived in Pittsburgh in 1812. From 1812 to 1825, he operated a jewelry store, making and repairing watches on Market Street. In 1825, he began an engine building business.

== After office ==
After one term as mayor, Mr. Thomson renewed his energies in the engine fabrication industry. His firm also built railroad freight cars.

From 1853 until 1871, Thomson was the engineer for the Pittsburgh Gas Works. He is buried in Allegheny Cemetery.

== See also ==
- List of mayors of Pittsburgh

== Sources ==
- South Pittsburgh Development Corporation
- Political Graveyard

Preceded by William W. Irwin	Mayor of Pittsburgh; 1841–1842	Succeeded by Alexander Hay
