= F. T. F. Lovejoy =

American industrialist (1854–1932)

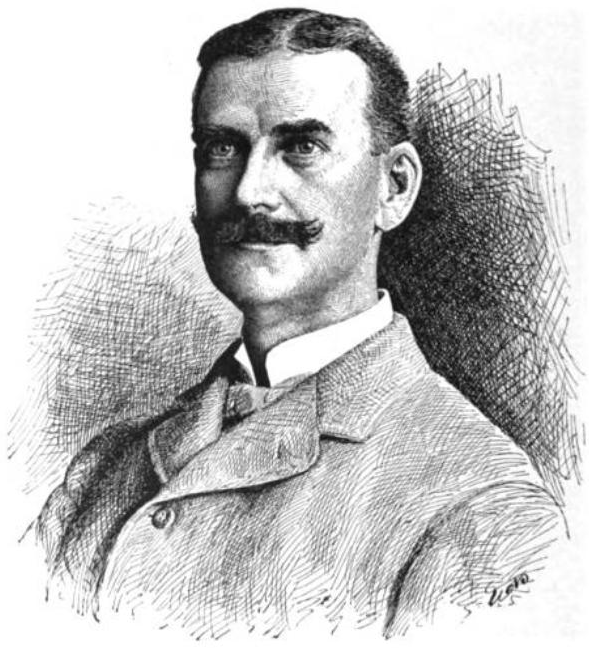
- Born: Francis Thomas Fletcher Lovejoy; July 21, 1854; Baltimore, Maryland
- Died: December 5, 1932 (aged 78); Pittsburgh, Pennsylvania
- Resting place: Allegheny Cemetery
- Occupation: Businessman
- Spouse: Jane Clyde Fleming (m. 1892)
- Children: 3

Francis Thomas Fletcher Lovejoy (July 21, 1854, Maryland – December 5, 1932, Pennsylvania) was an American industrialist and an associate of Andrew Carnegie, Henry Clay Frick, Henry Phipps, Jr. and Charles M. Schwab in the creation of the United States Steel Corporation.

== Early life ==
F. T. F., as he was known, was born on July 21, 1854, in Baltimore, Maryland, the son of William A. Lovejoy and his wife Mary Jane Robinson. In the late 1850s, William and his brothers Perry, George, Samuel and sister Jane, and their families, left Maryland and moved to southeastern Ohio.

=== First jobs ===
Around 1870, at the age of 16, FTF left home in Guernsey County, Ohio, and went to Washington, Pennsylvania, where he obtained employment as a telegrapher. Shortly after that he went to Titusville, Pennsylvania, then the center of the new oil industry, and engaged in many different employments in that area, including the oil, telegraph and newspaper businesses.

=== Joins Carnegie Company ===
After ten years in Titusville, FTF went to Pittsburgh, Pennsylvania, where he joined Carnegie Brothers Company in June 1881. His rise there was rapid and by 1889, at the age of 35, was an equity owner in the business. Two years later he was a member of the board of directors, sitting with such prominent titans of industry as Carnegie, Frick, Schwab and Phipps.

== Prominent businessman ==
All through the 1890s, FTF continued his rise in the Carnegie companies, with the full trust and confidence of everyone in the inner circle. However, Carnegie and Frick had a falling out over the management and direction of the companies, resulting in a lawsuit by Frick against Carnegie. FTF, in order to resolve this matter, took the radical step of resigning all of his positions, thereby becoming a neutral party, trusted by all sides, and worked out the "new agreement," as it was known, under which the United States Steel Company was to be formed. FTF later invested his substantial assets into gold mining interests in Idaho.

== Family life ==
In 1892, FTF married Jane Clyde Fleming (1869–1941). Their children were Francis Fleming Lovejoy (1894–1916); Kenneth Frick Lovejoy (1896–1947); and Marjory (1899–1980). Kenneth (known as Curley) was one of the first air mail pilots, flying out of Bettis Field near Pittsburgh. FTF himself is reputed to be the first American ever to ride a bicycle.

FTF died on December 5, 1932 and is buried in Pittsburgh's Allegheny Cemetery along with Jane and their three children.

== Retirement ==
FTF was interested in genealogy and carried out a genealogical correspondence with Clarence Lovejoy (author of Lovejoy's College Guide), tracing the family back to England.
