= Phil Auten =

American business executive and Major League Baseball owner

- Born: February 1840; Milton, Pennsylvania
- Died: March 7, 1919 (aged 79); Pasadena, California
- Occupations: Business executive in lumber and mining; Co-owner of the Pittsburgh Pirates (1893–1900)
- Spouse: Isabella Auten née Seydell
- Children: 2

Phillip Lesher Auten (February 1840 – March 7, 1919) was an American business executive in the lumber and mining industries, best remembered as controlling owner of the Pittsburgh Pirates professional baseball team of the National League (NL) from 1893 through 1900 with William Kerr.

== Baseball ownership ==
Auten and William Kerr were stockholders of the Pittsburgh Burghers of the Players' League in that league's only season of 1890. In early 1893, the two men gained a controlling interest in Pittsburgh's National League club, the Pirates, which had absorbed and merged ownership with the defunct Players' League club, when they and manager Al Buckenberger bought out the stock of William Chase Temple. Auten and Kerr sold their majority share of the Pirates to Barney Dreyfuss prior to the 1901 season.

== Personal life ==
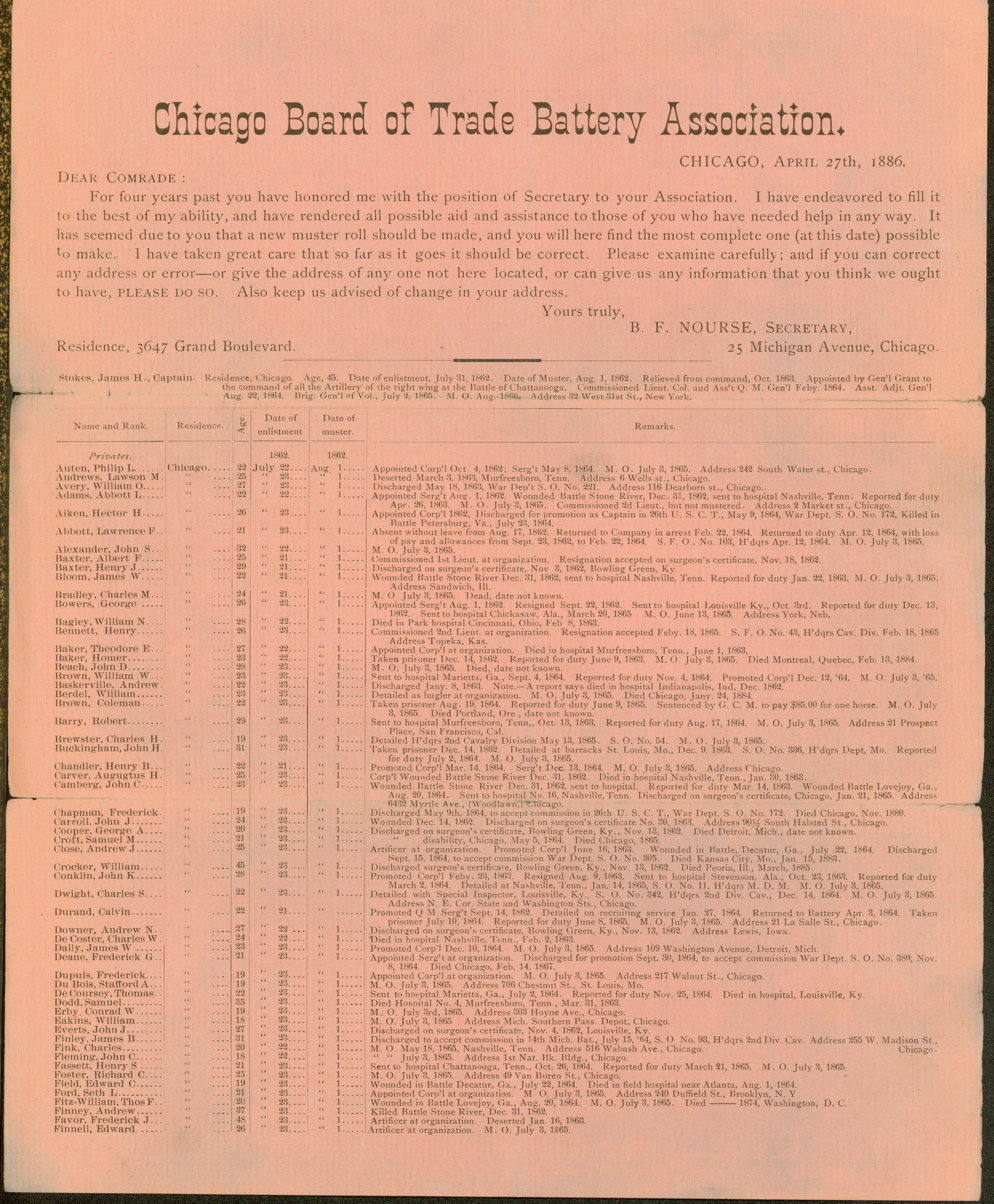
Roster of the Chicago Board of Trade Battery Association, April 27, 1886. Auten is the first soldier listed.

Auten was born in Milton, Pennsylvania, in February 1840. He moved to Chicago in 1858, where he began working in the lumber industry. He served in the Union Army during the Civil War, as a member of the Chicago Board of Trade Independent Battery Light Artillery. After the war, he returned to Chicago and resumed his career in lumber, later co-founding a company, Billings & Auten. In 1879, Auten became co-owner of the Ford River Lumber Company, continuing in that role until 1896.

During his time as owner of Pittsburgh-based teams, Auten continued to live in Chicago. He became involved in mining in the Western United States, and was one of the incorporators of the Isabell Mining Company, founded in 1898 in Douglas County, Washington. He was also a member of the Chicago Stock Exchange. In 1902, he bought land in Pasadena, California, to construct what would become his retirement home. Auten died in Pasadena in March 1919; he was survived by his wife, one daughter, and one son.
