= Alexander Hay (mayor) =

Mayor of Pittsburgh

12th Mayor of Pittsburgh
- In office 1842–1845
- Preceded by: James Thomson
- Succeeded by: William J. Howard

Personal details
- Born: April 8, 1806 Scotch Hill, Pittsburgh, Pennsylvania
- Died: November 5, 1882 (aged 76)

Military service
- Allegiance: United States
- Rank: Captain
- Battles/wars: Mexican–American War; American Civil War: Siege of Yorktown

Alexander Hay (April 8, 1806 – November 5, 1882) was Mayor of Pittsburgh, USA, from 1842 to 1845.

== Biography ==
Hay was born in the neighborhood known as Scotch Hill. By age eleven, he worked in a glass house and learned the trade of cabinetry.

The Roman Catholic Diocese of Pittsburgh was created during Mayor Hay's term. Also, navigation on the Monongahela River was opened as far south as Brownsville during his administration.

Hay's life of public service continued after his term as mayor. He commanded the Jackson Blues during the Mexican War. During the Civil War, he was captain of Company E. Pennsylvania Regiment. He was at the Battle of Yorktown.

He and his son were the proprietors of a fine furniture business. Hay died in 1882 and is buried in the Allegheny Cemetery.

== See also ==
- List of mayors of Pittsburgh

Preceded by James Thompson	Mayor of Pittsburgh; 1842–1845	Succeeded by William J. Howard
