= John Arbuckle (businessman) =

American businessman (1838–1912)

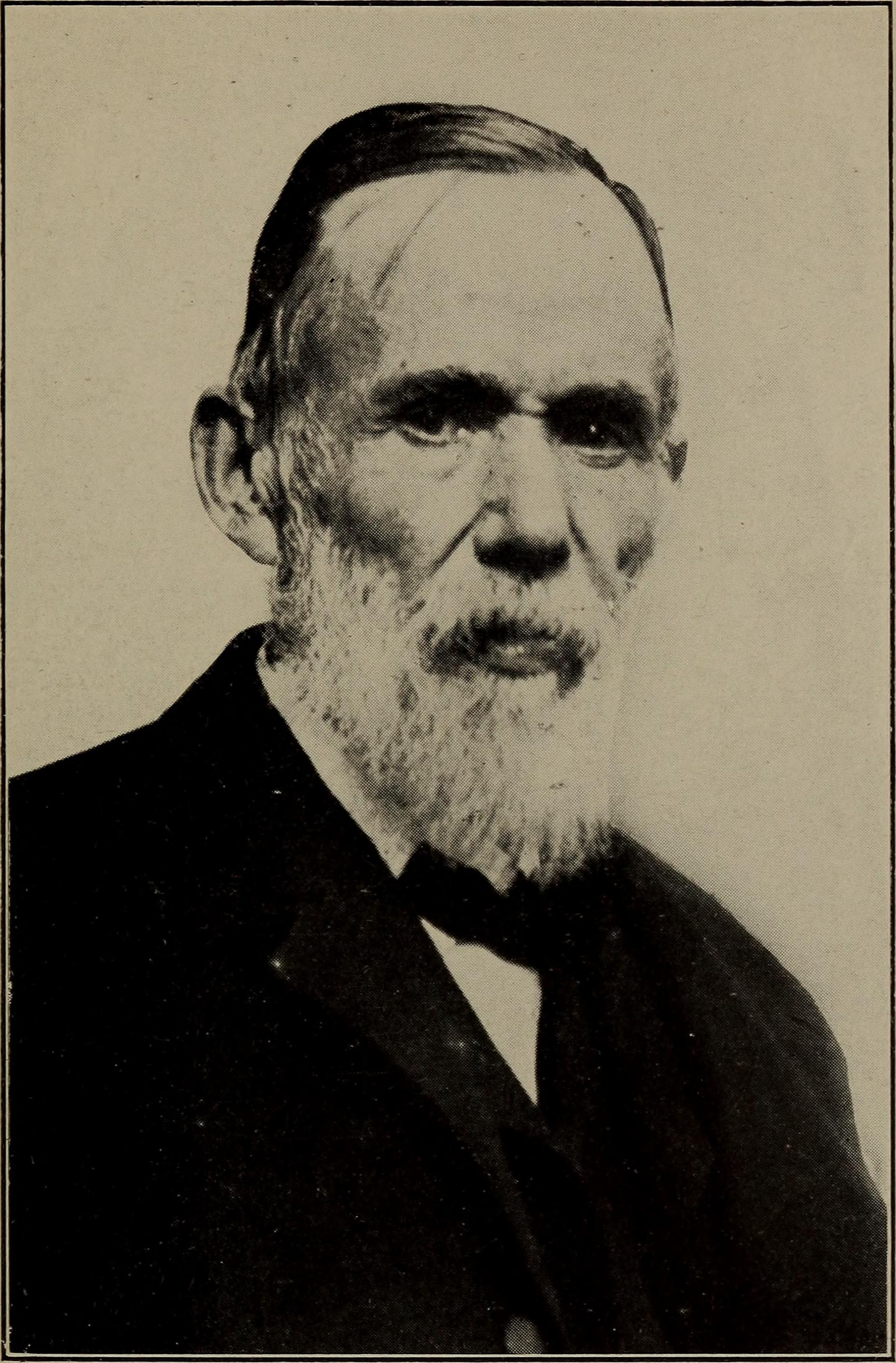
- Photograph of Arbuckle
- Born: John Arbuckle III; 1838; Scotland
- Died: March 27, 1912 (aged 73–74); New York City, New York, U.S.
- Resting place: Allegheny Cemetery; Pittsburgh, Pennsylvania, U.S.
- Education: Washington and Jefferson College
- Organization: Arbuckle Brothers
- Known for: coffee and sugar production
- Spouse: Mary Alice Kerr (m. 1868; died 1897)
- Military career
- Allegiance: United States
- Conflicts: American Civil War

John Arbuckle (1838 – March 27, 1912) was an American businessman who founded Arbuckle Brothers Company, a coffee roasting and sugar refining company.

== Early life ==
John Arbuckle III was born in Scotland in 1838 to Thomas Arbuckle, a Scottish immigrant to the United States and an operator of a cotton mill and a small grocery and spice business. He attended local schools in Allegheny City and Pittsburgh. He attended Washington and Jefferson College for a short time starting in 1856. He dropped out shortly after.

== Career ==
=== Early career ===
In 1860, Arbuckle entered the grocery business with his brother, Charles. Arbuckle served in Company B of the 15 Militia Regiment called by Governor Andrew Curtin under the threat of a Confederate invasion in 1862 during the Civil War. He served as a private for 10 days, when the unit was discharged. He later served in the Independent Cavalry Battalion in July 1863 for a period of six months. Under both units, he did not receive any military training and never left the county. He returned to the grocery business and they renamed the company to Arbuckles & Co. when the brothers' uncle died in 1865.

=== Coffee business ===
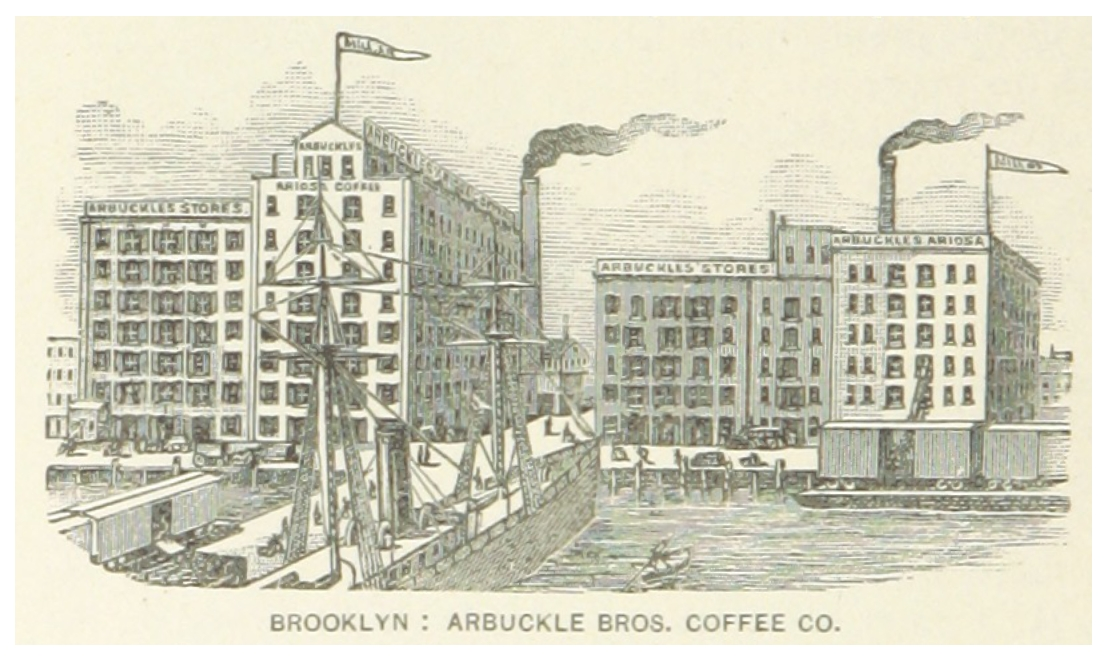
Arbuckle Brothers Company in Dumbo, Brooklyn

The Arbuckles entered into a coffee roasting business together in Pittsburgh. In 1868, Arbuckle patented a formula for an egg-based glaze that coated coffee beans, protecting them from the air. In 1871, the brothers moved their business to New York City and formed the Arbuckle Brothers Company. He was the first merchant to sell packaged coffee. He invented a machine with a machinist and draftsman to fill, weigh, seal, and label the bags in one continuous operation. Arbuckle sold his packaged coffee under the Ariosa brand and was popular in the western frontier, gaining the motto: "The Coffee that won the West". The brand had a sugar coating to add sweetness and an egg coating to allow the grounds to settle quickly.

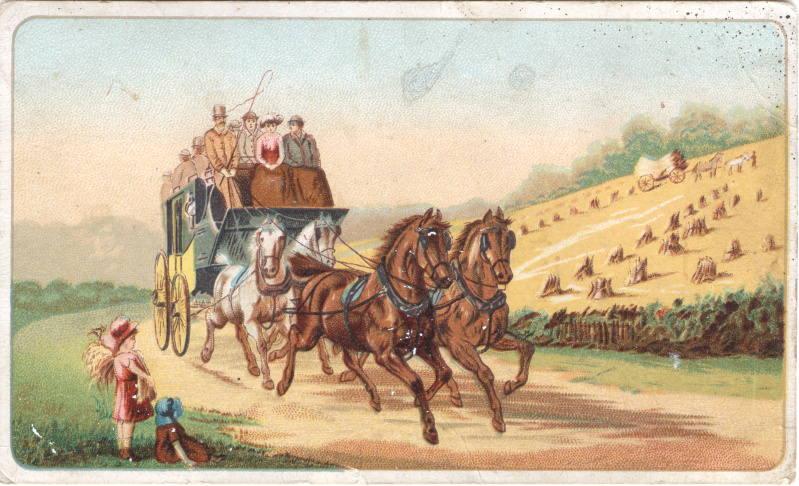
Advertisement of Arbuckle Brothers Company

The Arbuckles used creative marketing with their coffee. They included premium coupons in their packaged coffee, which allowed them to get a secondary revenue source in other goods, like handkerchiefs, curtains, and razors. Arbuckle's coffee empire in the United States earned him the nickname "Mr. Coffee".

=== Sugar business ===
The brothers then sought expanding from coffee to sugar. Arbuckle developed and patented a machine that automatically filled and sealed sugar bags. They set up a partnership with Henry Havemeyer, head of the Sugar Trust, to produce sugar in two-pound bags. Charles died in 1890.

==== Sugar War ====
Havemeyer made inroads to keep sugar prices low, and this challenged Arbuckle and his growing sugar business. In January 1897, Arbuckle started to build a sugar refinery. For the next two decades, Arbuckle and Havemeyer waged a "sugar war". Havemeyer bought a controlling interest in Woolson Spice Company of Toledo, Ohio, Arbuckle's main competition in the coffee industry. The competition caused coffee prices and product quality to drop. In 1898, when Arbuckle's refinery was complete, the price war extended to sugar. In 1901, Arbuckle and Havemeyer agreed to end the war and Havemeyer accepted Arbuckle's presence in the sugar industry. They both raised prices again, and this allowed an additional competitor in the sugar industry, Claus Spreckels and the Spreckels Sugar Company. The "sugar war" is estimated to have cost the participants more than US$25,000,000 (equivalent to about $967,500,000 in 2025).

By 1911, the Sugar Trust left the coffee business.

=== Legal issues ===
In 1901, Edward Beverstock, a food and dairy inspector in Toledo, charged a retailer selling Arbuckle's coffee with violating Ohio's pure food law. The charge was for using egg and sugar glaze to increase the weight and inferiority of the coffee product. The trial was held in Toledo, and Harvey W. Wiley, chief chemist of the U.S. Department of Agriculture, was used as a witness. The jury found Arbuckle guilty, but the appeals court reversed the conviction, citing that the original jury had been improperly selected and were closely associated with the claimant and his son. Arbuckle became friends with Wiley and worked with him in the pure food movement. Arbuckle established an independent sugar testing laboratory to monitor the quality of sugar in the American market. There is suspicion that Havemeyer may have had some involvement in these legal issues.

In 1909, Arbuckle's firm was implicated in arranging customs fraud for underweighing and undervaluing crude sugar shipments in its Brooklyn docks with custom inspectors. They claimed no knowledge of the arrangement, but agreed to pay the U.S. Department of the Treasury US$695,573 (equivalent to about $26,918,700 in 2025), a sum representing shortage of duties for the last ten years.

=== Other endeavors ===
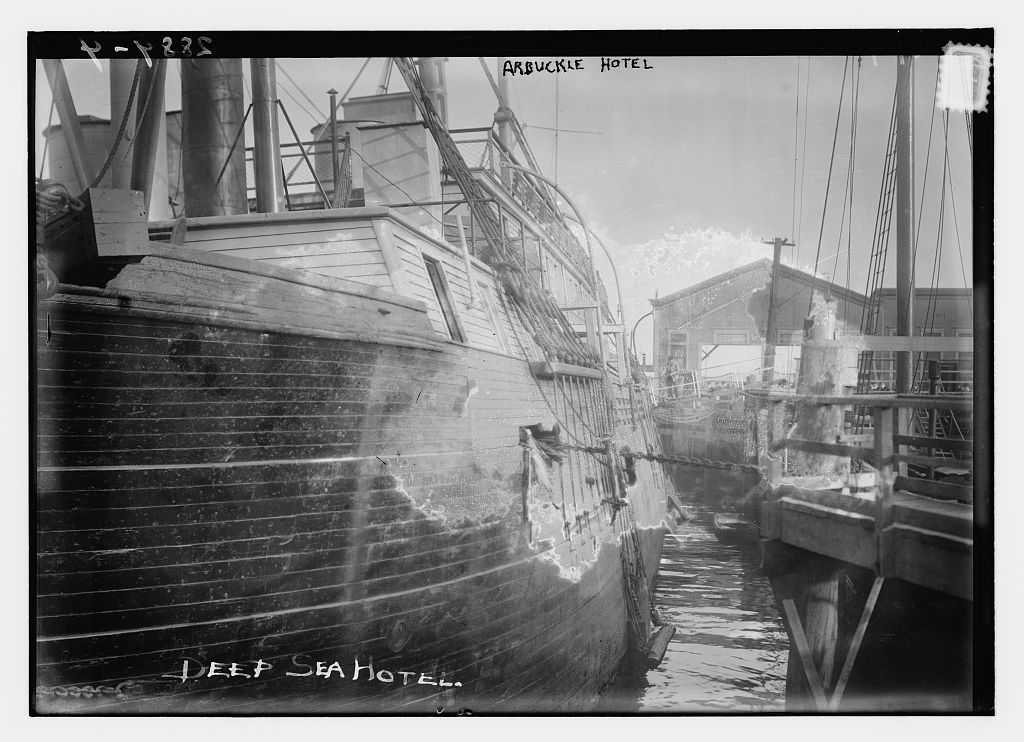
Arbuckle Deep Sea Hotel (1910)

In 1901, Arbuckle also entered the towing business. He believed that a rate of US$50 (equivalent to about $1,900 in 2025) to tow from New York City to Albany was too steep. The price of towing quickly dropped, reaching a low of US$5 (equivalent to about $200 in 2025), and caused a permanent lowering of towing costs. He also designed methods to raise sunken vessels and worked to establish a warning system to allow ships in distress to call for help and salvage vessels would come to their aid. He founded the Arbuckle Wrecking Company and it helped salvage sinking ships, including the naval collier USS Nero and the USS Yankee.

Arbuckle built a retirement colony for older citizens and a hotel in Lake Mohonk. In 1901, he established the Arbuckle Deep Sea Hotel off the shore of New York City to help low income workers. He made another hotel for handicapped wishing to learn a trade. He also ran the Sunshine Magazine, a magazine for children.

== Personal life ==
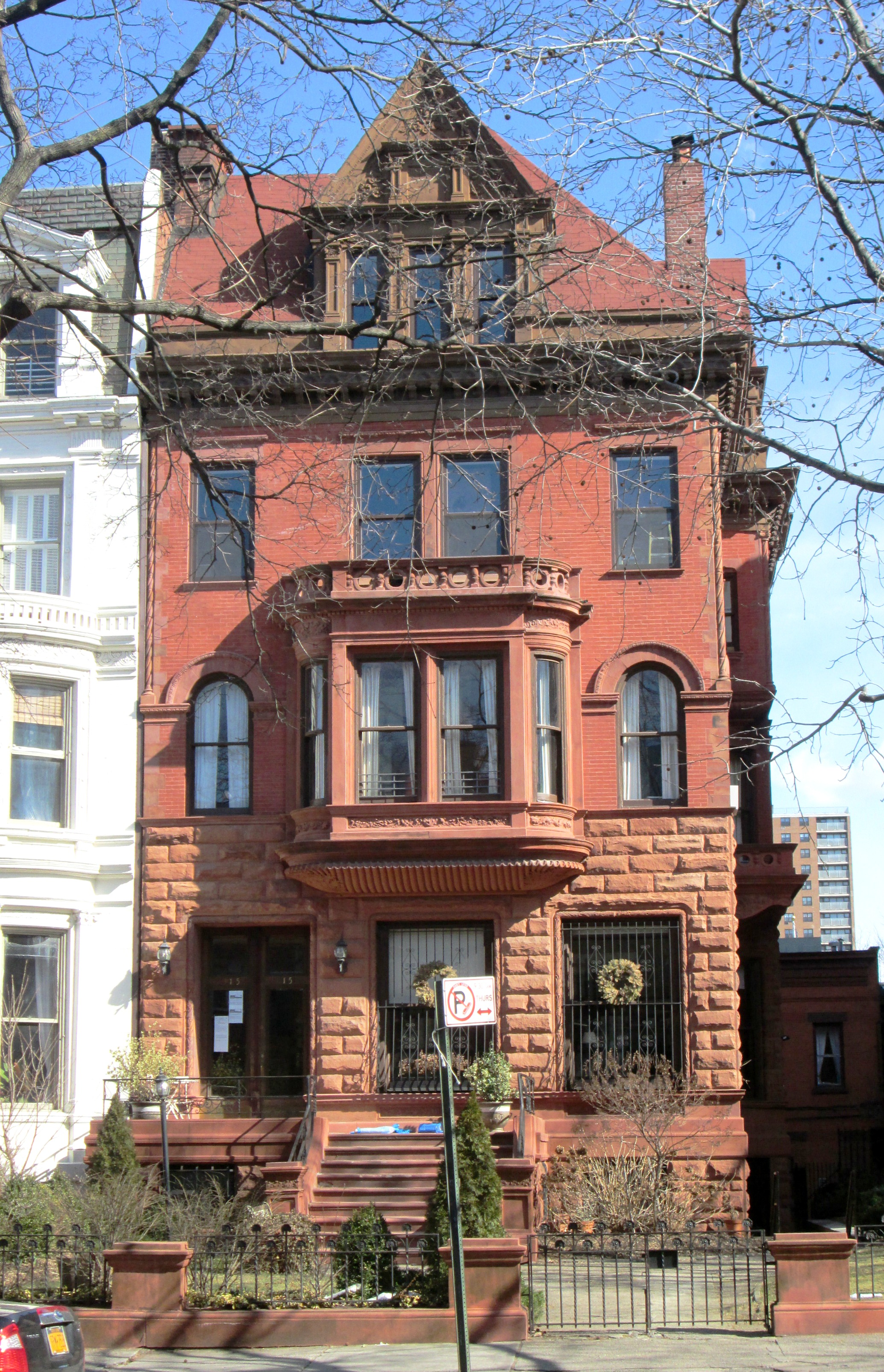
Arbuckle's house, part of the Clinton Hill Historic District in Brooklyn

Arbuckle married Mary Alice Kerr, daughter of William Kerr, the former mayor of Pittsburgh. They married in Pittsburgh in 1868. His wife died in 1897.

Arbuckle suffered from malaria later in life and died on March 27, 1912, at his house in Brooklyn. He was buried at Allegheny Cemetery with his wife.

== Legacy ==
=== Coffee business and brand ===
In 1921, the New York City location of Arbuckle Brothers in Dumbo, Brooklyn, was more than 12 city blocks with its own railroad and port facilities. The company stayed in family's hands until 1929. Arbuckle's company closed in 1935. It was sold and combined with Maxwell House, which would later join General Foods.

In 1994, a company based in Pleasant Hills, Pennsylvania, resurrected the Arbuckle name. Another company based in Tucson, Arizona, have sold coffee under the Arbuckle name since 1979.

The Yuban brand (sometimes Yule brand) was Arbuckle's name for his personal mix of fresh coffees for Christmas gifts. According to General Mills advertisements in the 1960s, Yuban was an abbreviation of Yuletide Banquet. Kraft Foods owns and distributes this brand today.

Jim Davis, the creator of the Garfield comic strip, took the name of Garfield's owner, Jon Arbuckle, from a Yuban commercial which mentioned Arbuckle as the founder of the company.

=== Philanthropy ===
The Community House in Allegheny City was gifted by Arbuckle's sisters as a living memorial to the family.

== See also ==
- Black Coffee (2007 film)
- Dumbo, Brooklyn
