= Butler Street Gatehouse =

- U.S. National Register of Historic Places
- U.S. Historic district – Contributing property
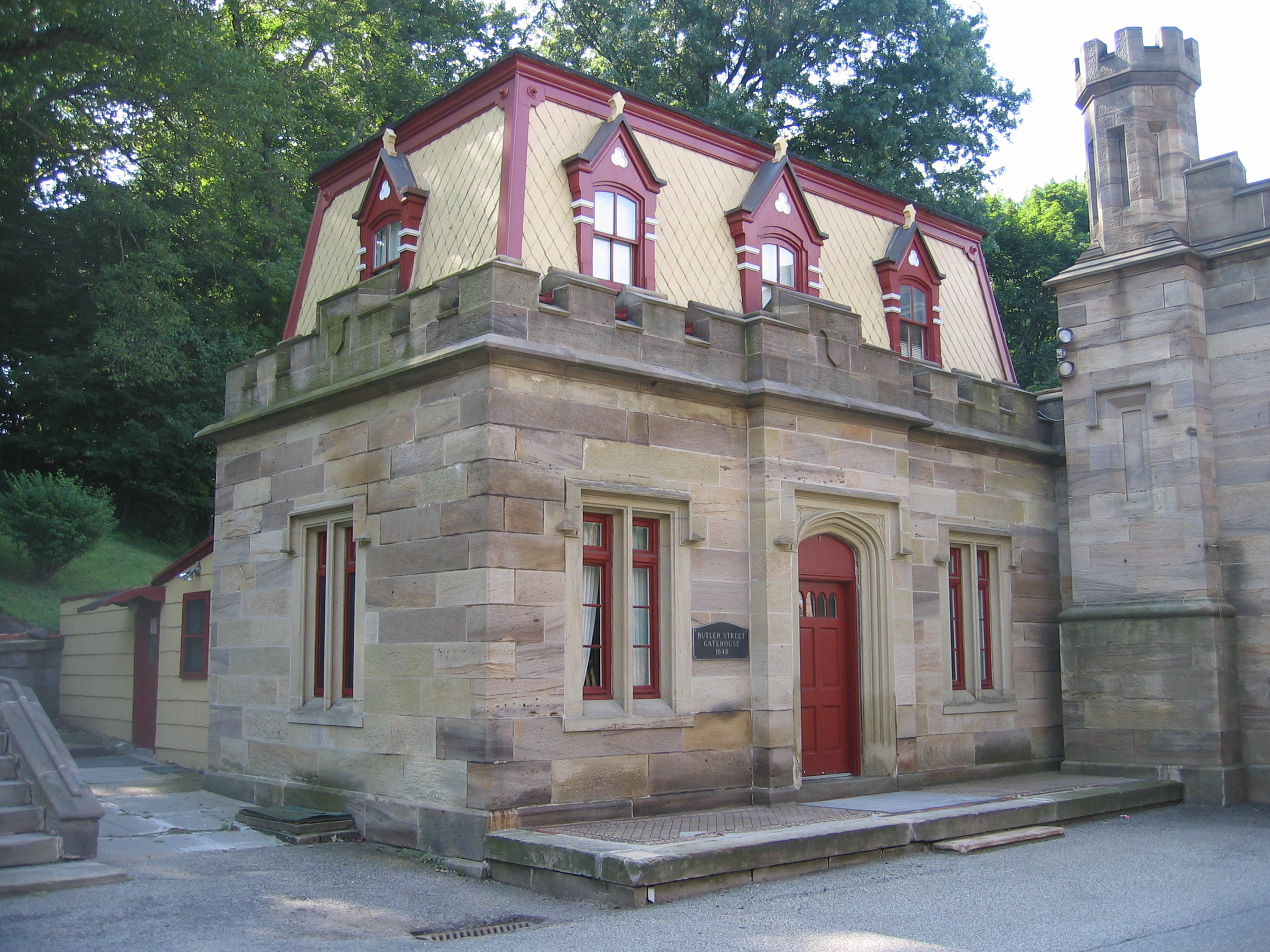

- Location within Pittsburgh Location within Pennsylvania Location within the United States
- Location: 4734 Butler St., Pittsburgh, Pennsylvania
- Coordinates: 40°28′30″N 79°57′27″W
- Area: 1 acre (0.40 ha)
- Built: 1848
- Architect: Chislett, John; Moser, Henry
- Architectural style: Gothic Revival, Romantic Picturesque
- Part of: Lawrenceville Historic District (ID100004020)
- NRHP reference No.: 74001734

Significant dates
- Added to NRHP: July 30, 1974
- Designated CP: July 8, 2019

The Butler Street Gatehouse at Allegheny Cemetery in Pittsburgh, Pennsylvania was built 1848 in the Gothic Revival style by John Chislett, Pittsburgh's first well-known architect and the founder of the cemetery. A chapel and offices, designed by Henry Moser, were added in 1870.

The gatehouse was listed on the National Register of Historic Places in 1974. The entire Allegheny Cemetery was listed on the National Register in 1980.

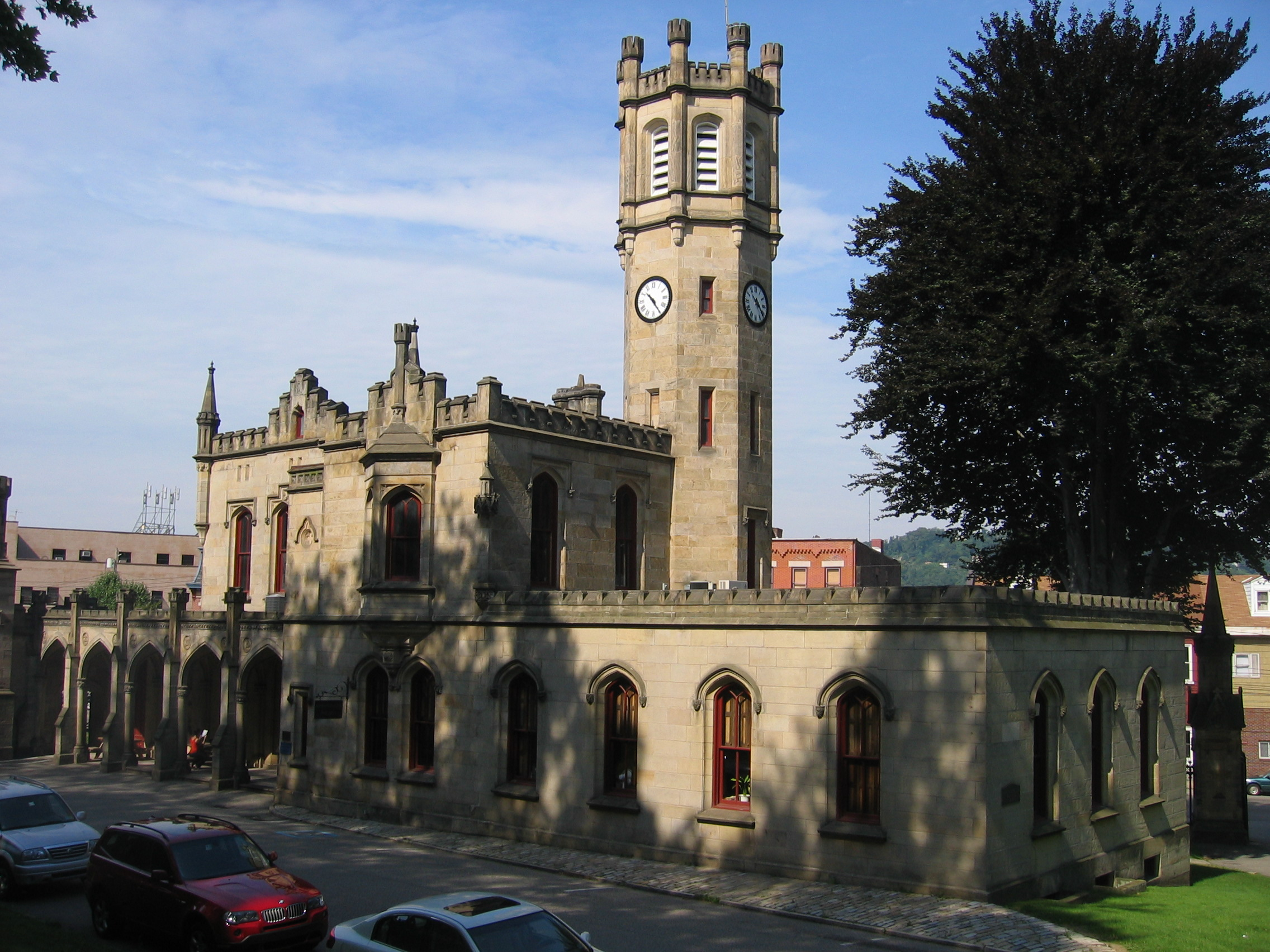
1870 addition
