= Conrad Feger Jackson =

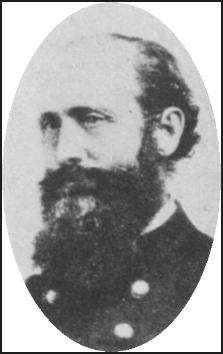
- Born: September 11, 1813; Alsace Township, Pennsylvania, US
- Died: December 13, 1862 (aged 49); Fredericksburg, Virginia, US
- Burial place: Allegheny Cemetery, Pittsburgh, Pennsylvania
- Military career
- Allegiance: United States; Union
- Branch: United States Army; Union Army
- Service years: 1861–1862
- Rank: Brigadier General
- Unit: Army of the Potomac
- Commands: 3rd Brigade, Pennsylvania Reserves
- Conflicts: American Civil War; Peninsula Campaign; Second Battle of Bull Run; Battle of Fredericksburg †

Conrad Feger Jackson (September 11, 1813 – December 13, 1862) was a businessman and soldier from the state of Pennsylvania. He served as a brigadier general in the Union Army during the American Civil War and was killed in action during the Battle of Fredericksburg.

== Early life and career ==
Jackson was born in Alsace Township in Berks County, Pennsylvania, to a family of Quakers. His father, Isaac Jackson, despite his religious beliefs, had joined the United States Army during the War of 1812, and died six years later from disease contracted while in the service. After the death of his father, young Jackson moved into the household of an uncle in Chester County and was educated in local Quaker schools. As a young man, he worked in a commission warehouse in Philadelphia, but subsequently resigned to become a conductor on the Philadelphia and Reading Railroad. In 1845, he was appointed by President James K. Polk as a lieutenant in the revenue service, and subsequently was sent to Mexico as the bearer of dispatches to General Winfield Scott during the Mexican-American War.

After the war, Jackson returned to Pennsylvania, settling in Pittsburgh. He was actively involved in a local militia company. In the late 1850s into the following decade, Jackson was a manager of a petroleum oil company in the Kanawha Valley region of western Virginia.

== Civil War ==
With the secession of Virginia in early 1861, Jackson immediately resigned his position, returned to Pennsylvania and organized what became the 9th Pennsylvania Reserve Regiment in the Pittsburgh region. Governor Andrew G. Curtin appointed him as its colonel. He served with distinction during the 1862 Peninsula Campaign and was commended for his gallantry and on July 17 promoted to brigadier general in command of the 3rd Brigade of the Pennsylvania Reserves. He subsequently led his brigade during the Northern Virginia Campaign at the Second Battle of Bull Run, and later that summer and autumn in the Maryland Campaign. The General missed the battles of South Mountain and Antietam due to illness.

At Fredericksburg in mid-December, he led his brigade forward toward the right wing of the Confederate forces. His division commander, fellow Pennsylvanian George G. Meade, later wrote:

The Third brigade had not advanced over one hundred yards when the battery on the height on its left was re-manned, and poured a destructive fire into its ranks. Perceiving this, I dispatched my Aide-de-camp, Lieutenant Dehon, with orders for General Jackson to move by the right flank till he could clear the open ground in front of the battery, and then, ascending the height through the woods, sweep round to the left and take the battery. Unfortunately, Lieutenant Dehon fell just as he reached General Jackson, and a short time after, the latter officer was killed. The regiments did, however, partially execute the movement by obliquing to the right and advancing across the railroad, a portion ascending the heights in their front. The loss of their commander, and the severity of the fire, from both artillery and infantry, to which they were subjected, compelled them to withdraw."

General Jackson had ridden forward to give the contemplated order; but before he could relay it, he was struck in the head by a Confederate volley that also killed his aide. In mentioning his death, Meade wrote, "The public service has also to mourn the loss of Brigadier-General C. Faeger [sic] Jackson, an officer of merit and reputation, who owed his position to his gallantry and good conduct in previous actions."

Jackson's body was taken from the field three days after his death and transported back to Pittsburgh for his funeral. He was buried in the Allegheny Cemetery in Pittsburgh.

Fort Jones in Pittsburgh was referred to as Fort Jackson in his honor, although the fort was never formally renamed.

== See also ==
- List of American Civil War generals (Union)
- Pennsylvania in the American Civil War
