= Henry A. Weaver =

American politician

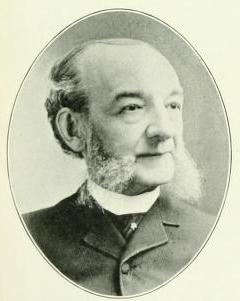

22nd Mayor of Pittsburgh
- In office 1857–1860
- Preceded by: William Bingham
- Succeeded by: George Wilson

Personal details
- Born: Henry Augustus Weaver; April 1, 1820 Freeport, Pennsylvania
- Died: September 26, 1890 (aged 70) Pittsburgh, Pennsylvania
- Party: Republican
- Spouse: Elizabeth A. Arthurs (m. 1842)
- Occupation: Businessman and politician

Henry Augustus Weaver (April 1, 1820 – September 26, 1890) was the Mayor of Pittsburgh from 1857 to 1860. He was a member of the Republican Party, and was the first Republican mayor of Pittsburgh.

== Formative years ==
Born in Freeport, Pennsylvania on April 1, 1820, Henry A. Weaver was one of the ten children of Benjamin Weaver. Educated in their community's public schools, Henry and his siblings relocated with their parents to Pittsburgh sometime around 1830, where his father launched a new business venture, the opening of the Mansion House at Fifth Avenue and Wood Street (later the site of the First National Bank). His father, who was politically active throughout Henry Weaver's youth, was a member of the Whig Party who was elected as sheriff of Allegheny County, Pennsylvania in 1840.

At the age of eighteen, Henry and his brother began their own careers by opening a canal and river supply business on Tenth Street. In 1842, Henry wed Elizabeth A. Arthurs (1820-1891), who was a daughter of fellow Pittsburgh resident Colonel William Arthurs.

== Business and political career ==
From 1852 to 1857, Weaver functioned as the sole proprietor of the canal supply store he had formed with his brother.

In 1856, he served as a delegate to the first Republican National Convention, during which John C. Frémont was chosen as the party's candidate for the upcoming election for the office of president of the United States. He also served as secretary of the Republican committee that same year. In 1857, he was elected as mayor of Pittsburgh, a post he held for three consecutive terms.

In 1860, President Abraham Lincoln appointed him as an assessor of internal revenue for Western Pennsylvania, a post he held until 1869.

Following the end of his public service career, Weaver pursued a career in the banking industry, becoming president of the Monongahela Savings Bank and a member of the board of directors of the Odd Fellows Savings Bank. He was also appointed to the board of directors of the Monongahela Incline Plane Company.

== Later years ==
In 1875, Weaver and his son-in-law, J. L. Marshall, became partners in a real estate firm. He continued working in that business until his death fifteen years later.

== Illness, death and interment ==
Following a lengthy illness, Weaver died at the age of seventy at the St. James Hotel in Pittsburgh on September 26, 1890. Funeral services were held at St. Peter's Episcopal Church; he was then buried in the Allegheny Cemetery. He was preceded in death by all but one of his four children, Mrs. J. L. Marshall. His widow, Elizabeth, died in 1891.

== See also ==
- List of mayors of Pittsburgh

Political offices
Preceded by William Bingham	Mayor of Pittsburgh; 1857–1860	Succeeded by George Wilson
