= Fort Jones (Mount Oliver) =

Fort Jones, with its companion, Fort Laughlin were Civil War redoubts, built by the employees of Jones and Laughlin Steel in June and July 1863 for the defense of Pittsburgh from a suspected invasion by Confederate troops. It is named for Benjamin Franklin Jones, a local businessman. Fort Jones occupied the top of a hill in Mount Oliver, Pennsylvania. It was destroyed in 1868, and became the site of St. Joseph's Church at 438 Ormsby Street, for which the site was originally purchased. The church is now closed. It was sometimes known as Fort Jackson, in honor of Brig. General Conrad Feger Jackson, killed in the Battle of Fredericksburg, Virginia, in December 1862. 40°24′45″N 79°58′50″W
