= William Kerr (mayor) =

American politician (1809–1853)

14th Mayor of Pittsburgh
- In office January 13, 1846 – January 2, 1847
- Preceded by: William J. Howard
- Succeeded by: Gabriel Adams

Personal details
- Born: September 15, 1809 or November 15, 1809 St. Clair Township, Allegheny County, Pennsylvania, U.S.
- Died: August 11, 1853 (aged 43)
- Resting place: Allegheny Cemetery; Pittsburgh, Pennsylvania, U.S.
- Party: Democratic
- Spouse: Mary Warden (m. 1840)
- Children: 4, including William
- Education: University of Pennsylvania Medical School
- Occupation: Physician; politician

William Kerr (1809 – August 11, 1853) was a medical doctor and politician from Pennsylvania. He served as Mayor of Pittsburgh from 1846 to 1847.

== Early life ==
William Kerr was born on September 15, 1809 or November 15, 1809, sources differ, to Agnes (née Reynolds) and Joseph Kerr in St. Clair Township in Allegheny County, Pennsylvania. His father was an Irish immigrant and a Presbyterian minister in Allegheny County. He graduated from the University of Pennsylvania Medical School in 1833.

== Career ==
In 1833, opened an office on Liberty Avenue the same year. He was also the owner of an apothecary on Wood Street. Kerr worked as a physician until he was elected.

Kerr was a Democrat. He was rejected for the Democratic nomination for Mayor of Pittsburgh in 1844. He defeated incumbent mayor William J. Howard in a close election in 1845. He served as mayor from January 13, 1846, to January 2, 1847. During his administration, Pittsburgh was being rebuilt with brick and stone following the Great Fire of Pittsburgh in 1845. During his time in office, he advocated for the merger of Allegheny and Pittsburgh. He did not seek re-election in 1847, but ran again in 1848 and lost by 96 votes.

During Mayor Kerr's term as mayor, the Pennsylvania Railroad was founded, as well as Mercy Hospital.

== Personal life ==
Kerr married Mary Warden on March 26, 1840. They had four children. A son, also named William, was a co-owner of the Pittsburgh Pirates during the 1890s. His sister-in-law was the daughter of Pittsburgh mayor John M. Snowden.

In 1848, Kerr moved to Chartiers Township, which is now the West End of Pittsburgh.

Kerr died on August 11, 1853, at the age of 43. He was buried at Allegheny Cemetery.

== Legacy ==
There exists today a Kerr Street in the city neighborhood of Elliott.

== See also ==
- List of mayors of Pittsburgh

Preceded by William J. Howard	Mayor of Pittsburgh; 1846–1847	Succeeded by Gabriel Adams
