= George Wilson (mayor) =

American politician

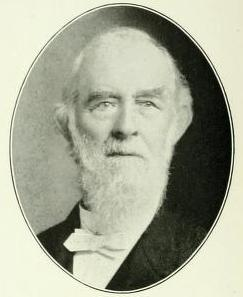
- George Wilson (1901)

23rd Mayor of Pittsburgh
- In office 1860–1862
- Preceded by: Henry A. Weaver
- Succeeded by: Benair C. Sawyer

Personal details
- Born: July 7, 1816 Baltimore, Maryland
- Died: February 5, 1902 (aged 85)
- Party: Republican
- Occupation: Lawyer businessman public servant

George Wilson (July 7, 1816 – February 5, 1902) was Mayor of Pittsburgh from 1860 to 1862.

== Life ==
Wilson was born in Baltimore. Moved to Pittsburgh in 1818. His Father Robert Wilson and Mother Ester Armstrong Wilson immigrated to the U.S. in 1814 from Ireland. Robert worked as a millwright and died in 1818. He was cared for by his sister Mrs. Margaret Marshall. He worked in the Tobacco factory of William Diller where he acquired a thorough knowledge of his own. He saved his money and eventually went into business for himself with James Fullerton in 1838 "Wilson & Fullerton" on Liberty Street. He eventually bought out his partner. He started in business alone and conducted it with much success for many years.

Wilson was much sought after in business enterprise becoming a director in the Peoples Savings Bank, Duquesne National Bank and Citizens Insurance Company. As soon as he became of age he took an interest in politics and civics.

=== Government ===
Wilson was elected to City Council in 1844 and served as the Director of the Public School and served for a long time. He took a strong stand in favor of the establishment of the High School. Despite opposition from many leading citizens. His election to Mayor was a tribute to his good citizenship. He served in the State Legislature 1867, 68 and 69. In his final year in the state legislature, he was the chairman of the ways and means committee. He served as the third President of the Humane Society 1895 -1902. He was one of the incorporators of the Boy's Industrial Home of Western Pennsylvania. In addition, he was also an attorney.

Mr. Wilson came into office in a presidential election year. The business of the city was at a standstill. But the citizens more than made up for this inactivity in their fervor in the campaign for Abraham Lincoln. As Mayor, Wilson introduced President-elect Abraham Lincoln from the balcony of the Monongahela House on a rain-soaked day in February 1861.

The tenseness of the political campaign was eased for a moment when an 18-year-old Englishman traveling as "Baron Renfrew" Prince of Wales, later Edward VII of England arrived in Pittsburgh, en route to the White House. Mayor Wilson delivered an address of welcome upon his arrival.

He was an elder and member and at First Presbyterian Church for a long time, and a founding elder and Sunday School Superintendent at Bellefield Presbyterian Church. He was and elder at Third Presbyterian Church.

Was appointed to the Committee of Public Safety during the Pittsburgh Rail Road Riots in 1877.

Married his first wife Miss Mary Frances Howe and there were six children in this union. Three died in infancy. Marie (Charles) McEnulty, Bella Jane (James A.) Wilson, and Mary Frances. Mary Frances Howe died in 1839 after her death in 1854 he married his second wife Miss Emily Wilson in 1855–1879. They had 3 children together; Harriett (F.O.) Van Gorder, Carrie Blanche Hill and Effie.

He died in his home at 835 S. Negley Avenue, on February 5, 1902, of pneumonia; and was buried at the Homewood Cemetery.

== See also ==
- List of mayors of Pittsburgh

== Sources ==
- Political Graveyard

Political offices
Preceded by Henry A. Weaver	Mayor of Pittsburgh; 1860–1862	Succeeded by Benair C. Sawyer
