= Benair C. Sawyer =

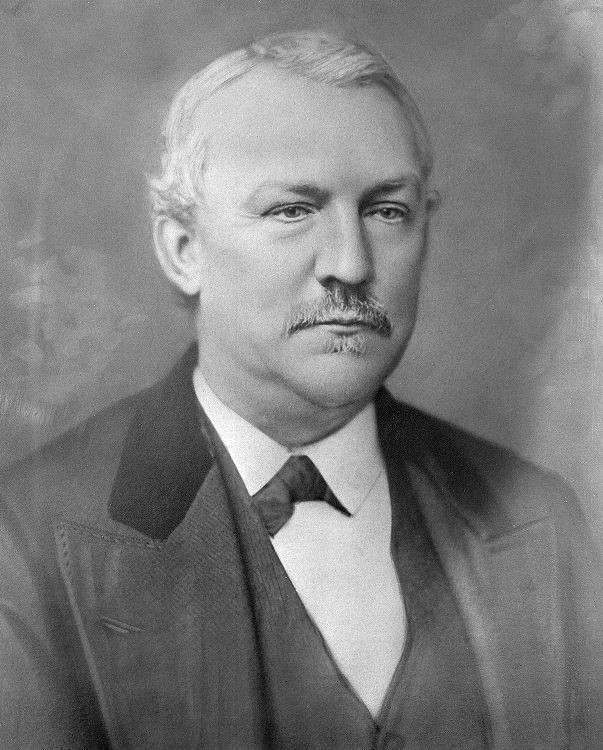
- Portrait of Benair C. Sawyer, c. 1862–1864

24th Mayor of Pittsburgh
- In office 1862–1864
- Preceded by: George Wilson
- Succeeded by: James Lowry, Jr.

Personal details
- Born: October 18, 1822
- Died: March 13, 1908 (aged 85)

Benair Clement Sawyer (October 18, 1822 – March 13, 1908), was the Mayor of Pittsburgh, Pennsylvania from 1862 to 1864.

== Life ==
His family was in the soap making business. While he was mayor the American Civil War's single worst civilian accident occurred when, on September 17, 1862, the Allegheny Arsenal exploded and claimed the lives of seventy-eight people. Most of the fatalities were young women.

After his political career, the Panic of 1873 decimated Sawyer's assets, forcing him to move to Colorado. He would later prosper there from investments in mining. He died in California.

== See also ==
- List of mayors of Pittsburgh

Preceded by George Wilson	Mayor of Pittsburgh; 1862–1864	Succeeded by James Lowry, Jr.
