= James Lowry Jr. =

American politician (1820–1876)

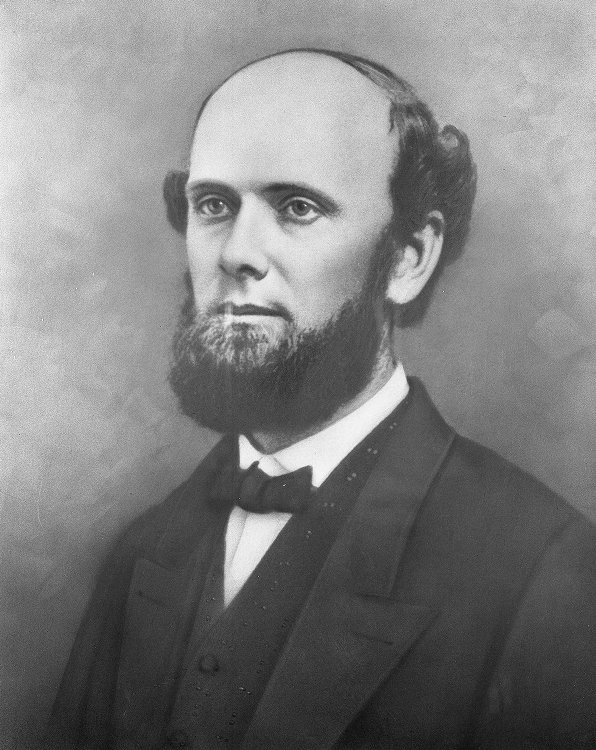
- Portrait of James Lowry Jr., c. 1864–1866

25th Mayor of Pittsburgh
- In office 1864–1866
- Preceded by: Benair C. Sawyer
- Succeeded by: William C. McCarthy

Personal details
- Born: 1820 Scotland
- Died: July 20, 1876 (aged 55/56) St. Louis, Missouri
- Resting place: Allegheny Cemetery, Pittsburgh

James Lowry Jr. (1820 – July 20, 1876) was an American politician and Mayor of Pittsburgh from 1864 to 1866.

Lowry was born in Scotland in 1820. He owned a foundry and was also a coal merchant. The city's industries were all booming during Mayor Lowry's term. He would eventually be elected Coroner of Allegheny County.

Lowry died in St. Louis. He is buried in Allegheny Cemetery.

== See also ==
- List of mayors of Pittsburgh

== Sources ==
- James Lowry Jr. at Political Graveyard

Political offices
Preceded by Benair C. Sawyer	Mayor of Pittsburgh; 1864–1866	Succeeded by William C. McCarthy
