= Allegheny Cemetery =

- U.S. National Register of Historic Places
- U.S. Historic district – Contributing property
- Pittsburgh Landmark – PHLF
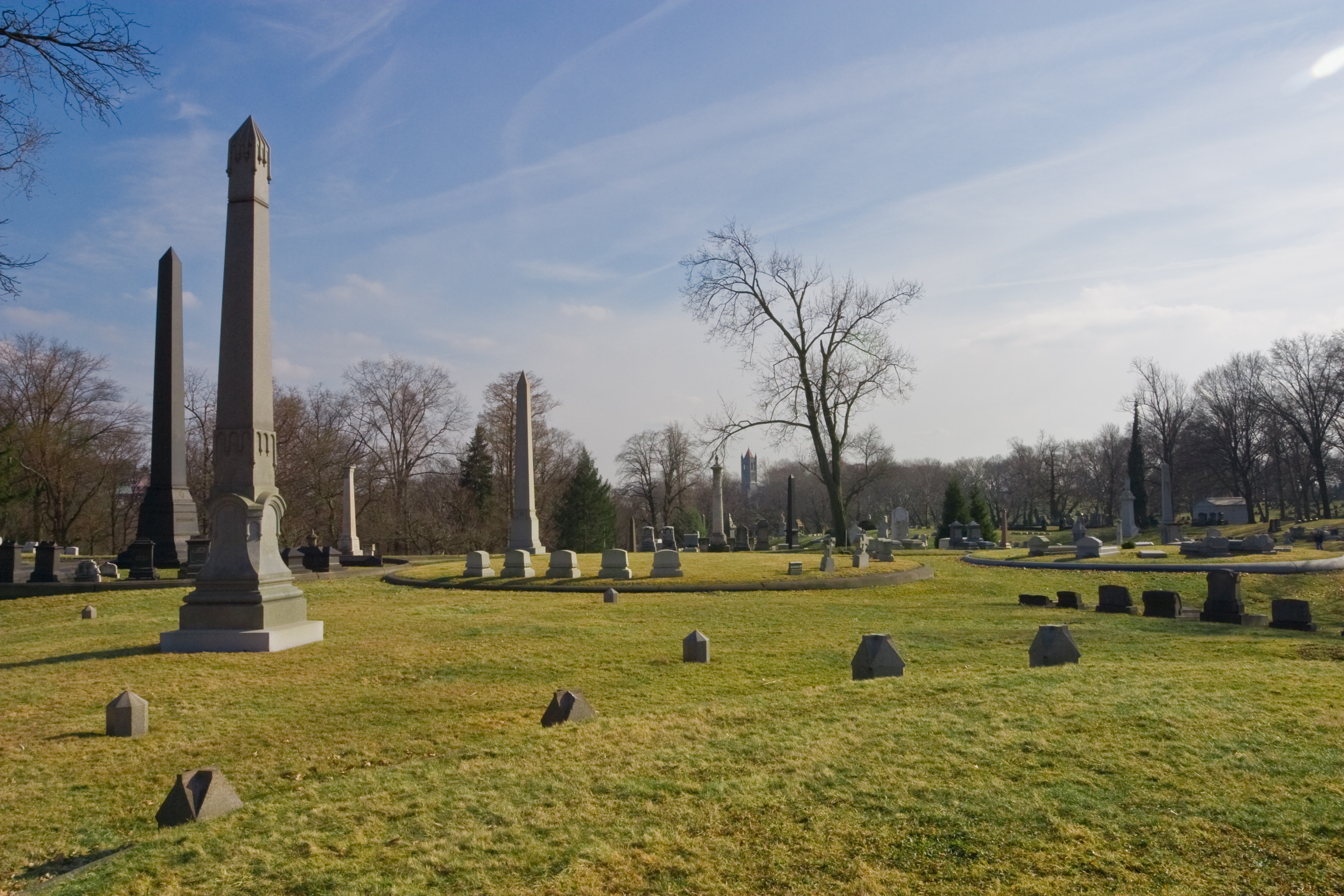
- Allegheny Cemetery in 2008

- Location within Pittsburgh Location within Pennsylvania Location within the United States
- Location: Roughly bounded by N. Mathilda and Butler Sts., and Penn, Stanton, and Mossfield Aves., Pittsburgh, Pennsylvania, U.S.
- Coordinates: 40°28′21″N 79°57′00″W
- Area: 300 acres (120 ha)
- Built: 1844
- Architect: Chislett, John; Multiple
- Architectural style: Late Victorian, Tudor Revival, English Gothic
- Part of: Lawrenceville Historic District (ID100004020)
- NRHP reference No.: 80003405

Significant dates
- Added to NRHP: December 10, 1980
- Designated CP: July 8, 2019
- Designated PHLF: 1988

Allegheny Cemetery is one of the largest and oldest burial grounds in Pittsburgh, Pennsylvania. It is a historic rural cemetery.

The non-sectarian, wooded hillside park is located at 4734 Butler Street in the Lawrenceville neighborhood, and bounded by the Bloomfield, Garfield, and Stanton Heights areas. It is sited on the north-facing slope of hills above the Allegheny River.

In 1973 the cemetery's Butler Street Gatehouse was listed on the National Register of Historic Places and, in 1980, the entire cemetery was listed on the National Register.

== History ==
Incorporated in 1844, the Allegheny Cemetery is the sixth oldest rural cemetery in the United States. It has been expanded over the years and now encompasses 300 acres (120 ha).

Allegheny Cemetery memorializes more than 124,000 people. Some of the oldest graves are of soldiers who fought in the French and Indian War. Their remains were reinterred here, moved from their original burial site at Trinity Cathedral in downtown Pittsburgh. Many notables from the city of Pittsburgh are buried here. The cemetery was among those profiled in the PBS documentary A Cemetery Special.

In 1834, three members of the Third Presbyterian Church of Pittsburgh, Dr. J. Ramsey Speer, Stephen Colwell and John Chislett Sr. determined to establish a rural cemetery near Pittsburgh. Dr. Speer later visited several famous rural cemeteries, Mount Auburn Cemetery in Boston, Laurel Hill Cemetery in Philadelphia, and Green-Wood Cemetery in Brooklyn, New York. In 1842 the group selected the 100-acre farm of Colonel Bayard for the site. An Act of Incorporation passed the Pennsylvania Legislature and was signed by Gov. David R. Porter on April 24, 1844.

Mt. Barney was selected as the site of a memorial to naval heroes in 1848, and Commodore Joshua Barney and Lt. James L. Parker were reinterred there. On Memorial Day, 1937, a new memorial was unveiled at Allegheny Cemetery, dedicated to the more than 7,000 servicemen buried here.

== Notable interments ==
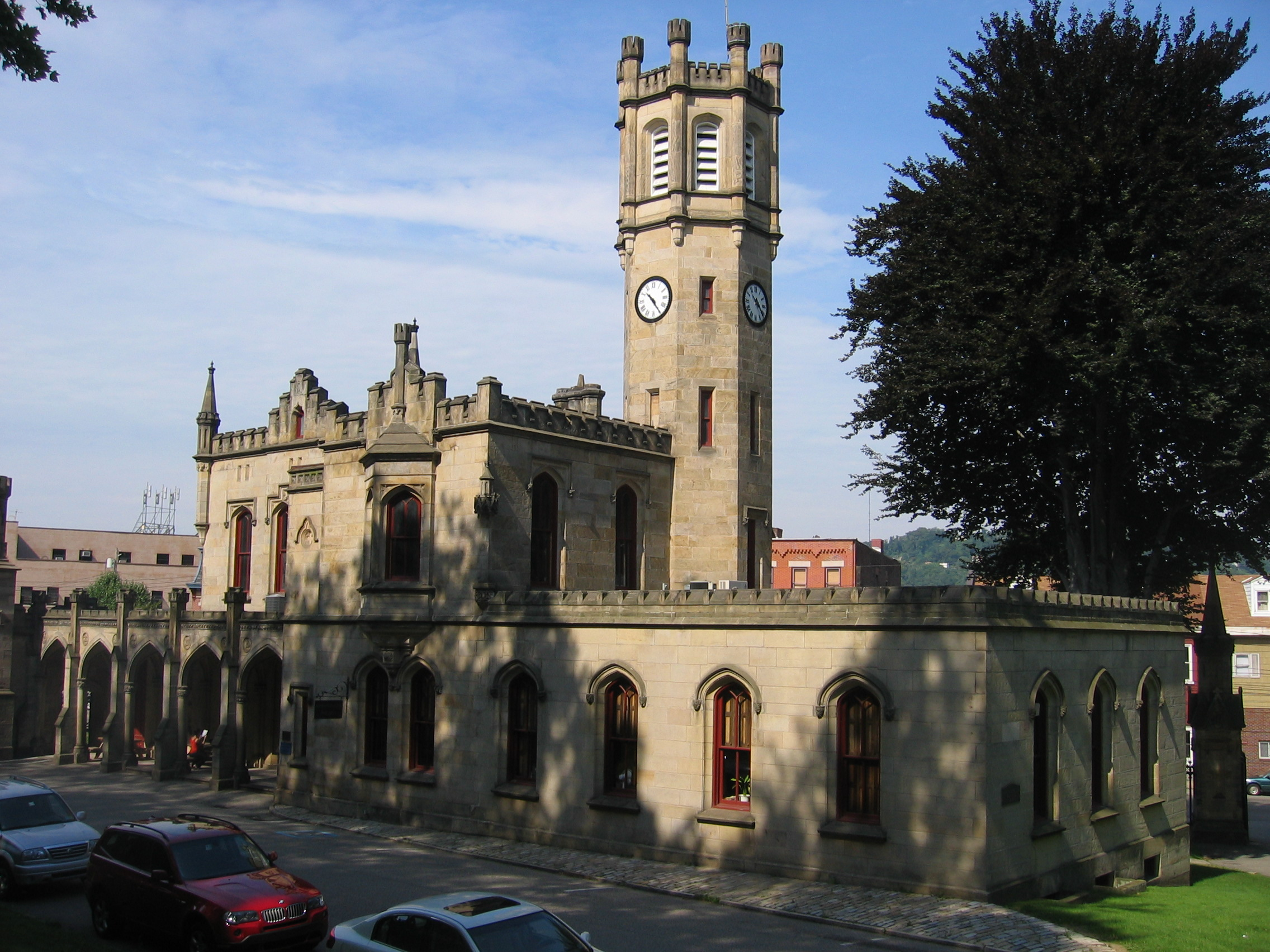
The Butler Street entrance (1870 portion)

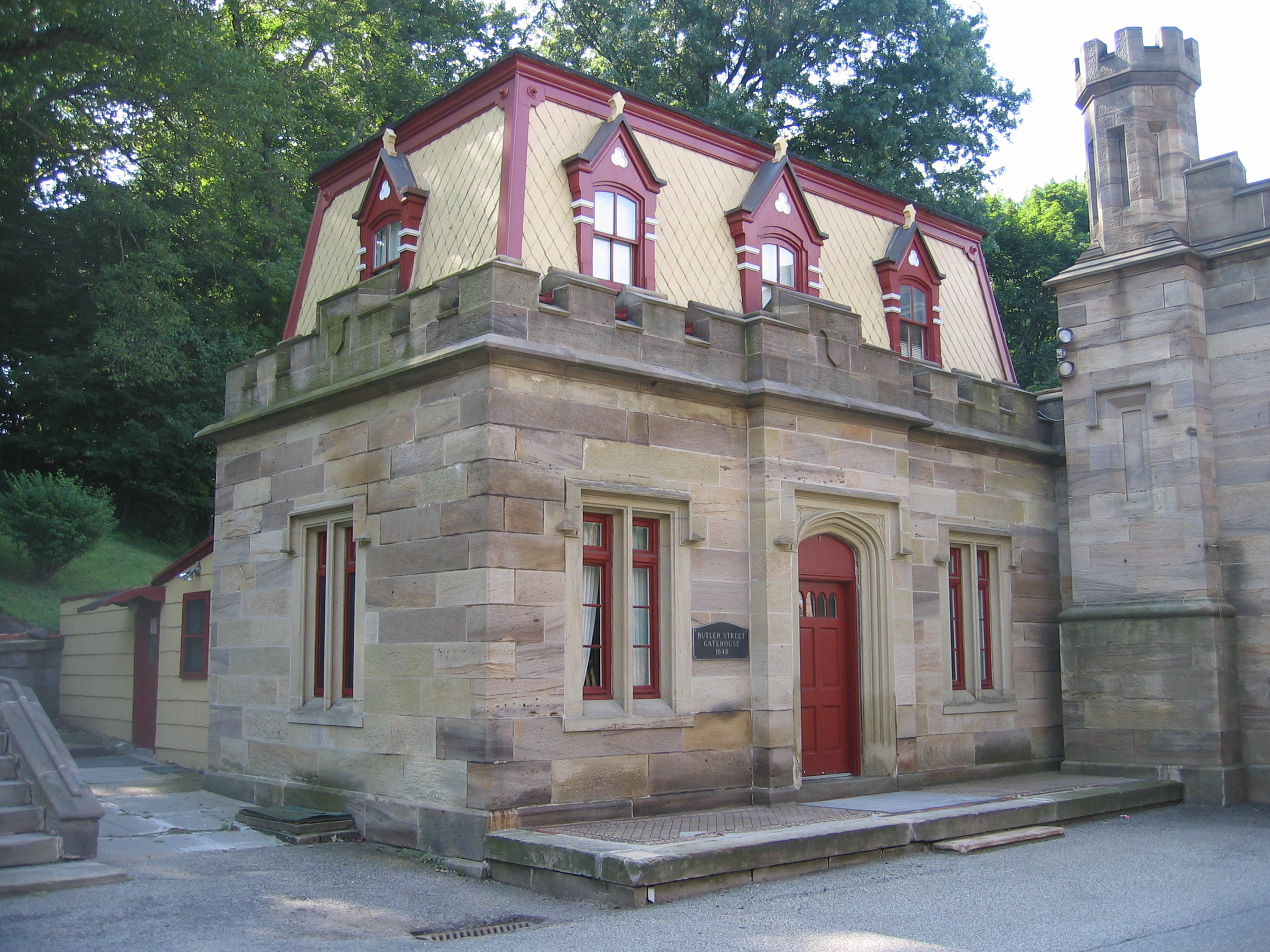
The 1848 portion of the Butler Street Gatehouse (located beside the 1870 portion of the Butler Street entrance shown in the above picture)

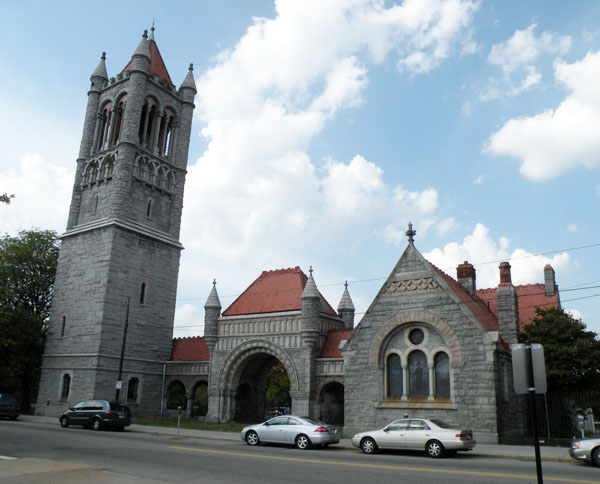
The Penn Avenue Gatehouse, built in 1887

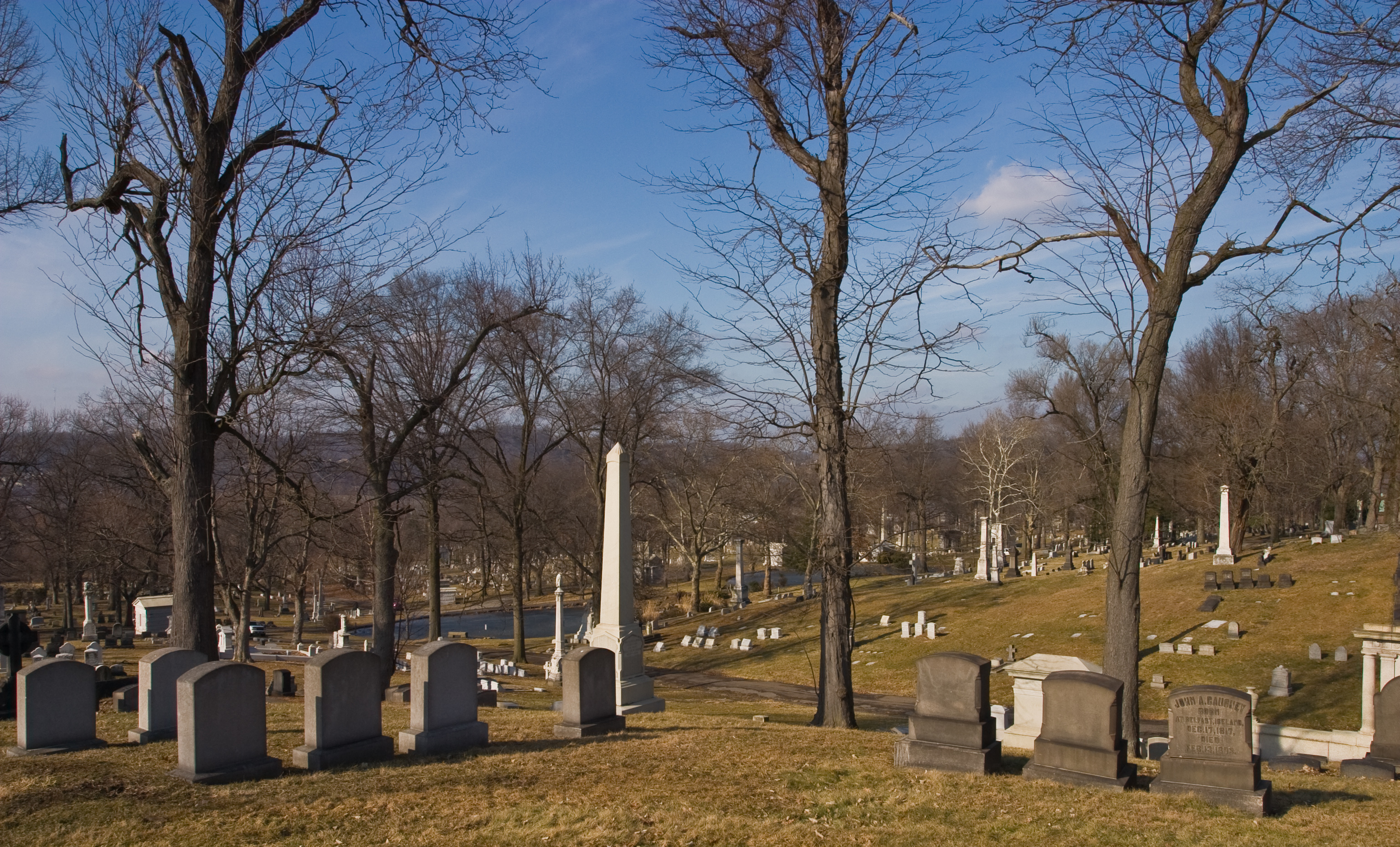
The cemetery has many hills, lakes, and wooded areas.

- Gabriel Adams (1790–1864), Mayor of Pittsburgh (1847–49)
- John Arbuckle (1838–1912), coffee and sugar businessman
- Marcus E. Baldwin (1863–1929), Major League Baseball player
- Joseph Barker (1806–1862), Mayor of Pittsburgh (1850–51)
- Joshua Barney (1759–1818), Commodore in the United States Navy and American Revolutionary War, War of 1812 veteran (Moved to new site in 1848)
- Richard Biddle (1796–1847), US Congressman
- Lem Billings (1916–1981), friend and campaigner for President John F. Kennedy
- William Bingham (1808–1873), Mayor of Pittsburgh (1856–57)
- James Blackmore (1821–1875), Mayor of Pittsburgh (1868–69 & 1872–75)
- Francis B. Brewer (1820–1892), US Congressman
- Don Brockett (1930–1995), motion picture and television actor, "Chef Brockett" on the PBS series Mister Rogers' Neighborhood
- Adam M. Brown (1826–1910), Mayor of Pittsburgh (1901)
- James W. Brown (1844–1909), US Congressman
- Jared M. Brush (1814–1895), Mayor of Pittsburgh (1869–72)
- Eben Byers (1880–1932), wealthy American industrialist and socialite noted for his gruesome death caused by consumption of the radioactive patent medicine Radithor.
- John Caldwell Jr. (1827–1902), George Westinghouse partner and member of the South Fork Fishing and Hunting Club
- Louis Semple Clarke (1867–1957), automotive pioneer, founder of the Autocar Company and member of the South Fork Fishing and Hunting Club
- James Wallace Conant (1862–1906), manager of the Schenley Park Casino and Duquesne Gardens, and founder of the Western Pennsylvania Hockey League.
- Beano Cook (1931–2012), college football commentator
- Daniel William Cooper (1830–1920), one of the founders of the Sigma Chi Fraternity
- John Dalzell (1845–1927), US Congressman
- Cornelius Darragh (1809–1854), US Congressman
- Ebenezer Denny (1761–1822), first Mayor of Pittsburgh (1816–17), American Revolutionary War veteran
- Harmar Denny (1794–1852), U.S. Congressman
- Harmar D. Denny Jr. (1886–1966), US Congressman
- William J. Diehl (1845–1929), politician and Mayor of Pittsburgh (1899–1901)
- Samuel Diescher (183–1915), engineer who designed the Duquesne Incline and the majority of such projects in Pennsylvania and the US, also designed many industrial projects
- Harry Allison Estep (1884–1968), US Congressman
- John Baptiste Ford (1811–1903), industrialist, founder of PPG Industries and Ford City, Pennsylvania
- Walter Forward (1786–1852), United States Secretary of the Treasury
- Stephen Foster (1826–1864), songwriter
- Andrew Fulton (1850–1925), Mayor of Pittsburgh (1884–87)
- Edward D. Gazzam (1803–1878), doctor, politician, and abolitionist
- Josh Gibson (1911–1947), baseball great of the Negro leagues
- Gus Greenlee (1893–1952), Major League Baseball Team Owner
- George W. Guthrie (1848–1917), Mayor of Pittsburgh (1906–09)
- John B. Guthrie (1807–1885), Mayor of Pittsburgh (1851–53)
- Lizzie M. Guthrie (1838–1880), missionary
- Moses Hampton (1803–1878), US Congressman
- Alexander Hay (1806–1882), Mayor of Pittsburgh (1842–45)
- General Alexander Hays (1819–1864)
- William B. Hays (1844–1912), Mayor of Pittsburgh (1903–06)
- Joseph Horne (1826–1891), founder of Pittsburgh department store Horne's; this chain closed in 1994
- Thomas Marshall Howe (1808–1877), US Congressman
- Alfred E. Hunt (1855–1899), co-founder of the company that became Alcoa
- Thomas Irwin (1785–1870), US Congressman
- William Wallace Irwin (1803–1856), US Congressman, Mayor of Pittsburgh (1840–41)
- William Freame Johnston (1808–1872), Governor of Pennsylvania
- William Kerr (1809–1853), Mayor of Pittsburgh (1846–47)
- Samuel Kier (1813–1874), pioneer oil refiner
- Charles H. Kline (1870–1933), Mayor of Pittsburgh (1926–33)
- Andrew W. Loomis (1797–1873), US Congressman
- F. T. F. Lovejoy (1854–1932), Industrialist, associate of Andrew Carnegie
- James Lowry Jr. (1820–1876), Mayor of Pittsburgh (1864–66)
- William McClelland (1842–1892), US Congressman
- Charles McClure (1804–1846), US Congressman
- James McCord (1822–1894), millionaire owner of the oldest hattery west of the Allegheny Mountains and member of the South Fork Fishing and Hunting Club
- Henry Sellers McKee (1843–1924), millionaire glass manufacturer, founder of Jeannette, Pennsylvania and member of the South Fork Fishing and Hunting Club
- Robert McKnight (1820–1885), US Congressman
- William McNair (1880–1948), Mayor of Pittsburgh (1934–36)
- Thomas Mellon (1813–1908), founder of Mellon Bank
- Alexander Pollock Moore (1867–1930), publisher of the Pittsburgh Leader and ambassador who was married to actress Lillian Russell
- James Kennedy Moorhead (1806–1884), US Congressman
- Philip H. Morgan (1825–1900), lawyer, jurist, diplomat
- General James S. Negley (1826–1901), Civil War general and U.S. Congressman
- John Neville (1731–1803), American Revolutionary War veteran and tax collector during the Whiskey Rebellion
- George Tener Oliver (1848–1919), publisher of the Pittsburgh Gazette Times and Chronicle Telegraph, US Senator
- Alfred L. Pearson (1838–1903), United States Army officer
- Henry Kirke Porter (1840–1921), US Congressman
- James Hay Reed (1853–1927), founding partner, Knox & Reed (now Reed Smith LLP), and member of the South Fork Fishing and Hunting Club
- Robert M. Riddle (1812–1858), Mayor of Pittsburgh (1853–54)
- John Buchanan Robinson (1846–1933), US Congressman
- William Robinson Jr. (1785–1868), politician, businessman and militia general
- Calbraith Perry Rodgers (1879–1912), aviation pioneer
- James Ross (1762–1847), US Senator
- Archibald H. Rowand Jr. (1845–1913), Civil War Congressional Medal of Honor Recipient
- Lillian Russell (1861–1922), singer, actress
- Ted Sadowski (1936–1993), Major League Baseball Player
- Richard Mellon Scaife (1932–2014), billionaire supporter of conservative causes, publisher of the Pittsburgh Tribune-Review
- George Shiras Jr. (1832–1924), United States Supreme Court Associate Justice
- Jacob B. Sweitzer (1821–1888), Pennsylvania lawyer and soldier. He commanded the 2nd Brigade of the 1st Division/5th Corps of the Army of the Potomac at the Battle of Gettysburg
- Jane Swisshelm (1815–1884), journalist, abolitionist, and women's rights advocate
- Adamson Tannehill (1750–1820), Revolutionary War and War of 1812 officer, US Congressman
- Benjamin Thaw (1859–1933), Pittsburgh financier and member of the South Fork Fishing and Hunting Club
- Harry Kendall Thaw (1871–1947), murderer of architect Stanford White, husband of Evelyn Nesbit
- James Thomson (1790–1876), Mayor of Pittsburgh (1841–42)
- Stanley Turrentine (1934–2000), jazz musician
- Ferdinand E. Volz (1823–1876), Mayor of Pittsburgh (1854–56)
- Rachel Mellon Walton (1899–2006), member of the prominent Mellon family, centenarian, and prominent Pittsburgh philanthropist
- Henry A. Weaver (1820–1890), Mayor of Pittsburgh (1857–60)
- Calvin Wells (1827–1909), industrialist, financier and member of the South Fork Fishing and Hunting Club
- Jane McDowell Foster Wiley (1829–1903), wife of Stephen Foster and inspiration for his song "Jeanie with the Light Brown Hair"
- Thomas Williams (1806–1872), Civil War congressman, prosecutor in the impeachment of President Andrew Johnson.
- The unidentified remains of 54 victims of the 1862 Allegheny Arsenal explosion.

== Gallery ==
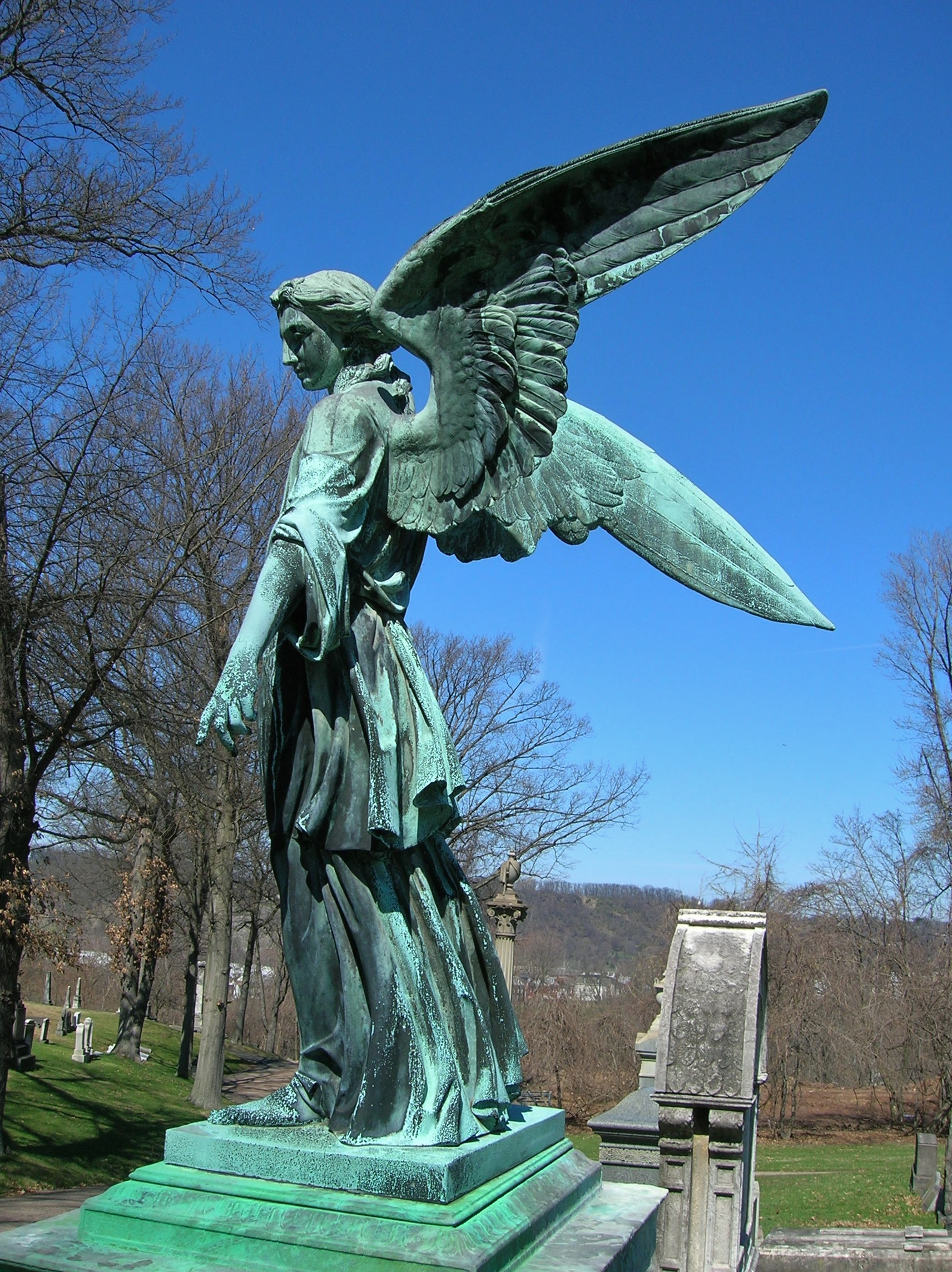
Angel of the Resurrection on James B. Hogg monument (sculpted by Henry Kirke Brown, ca. 1850)

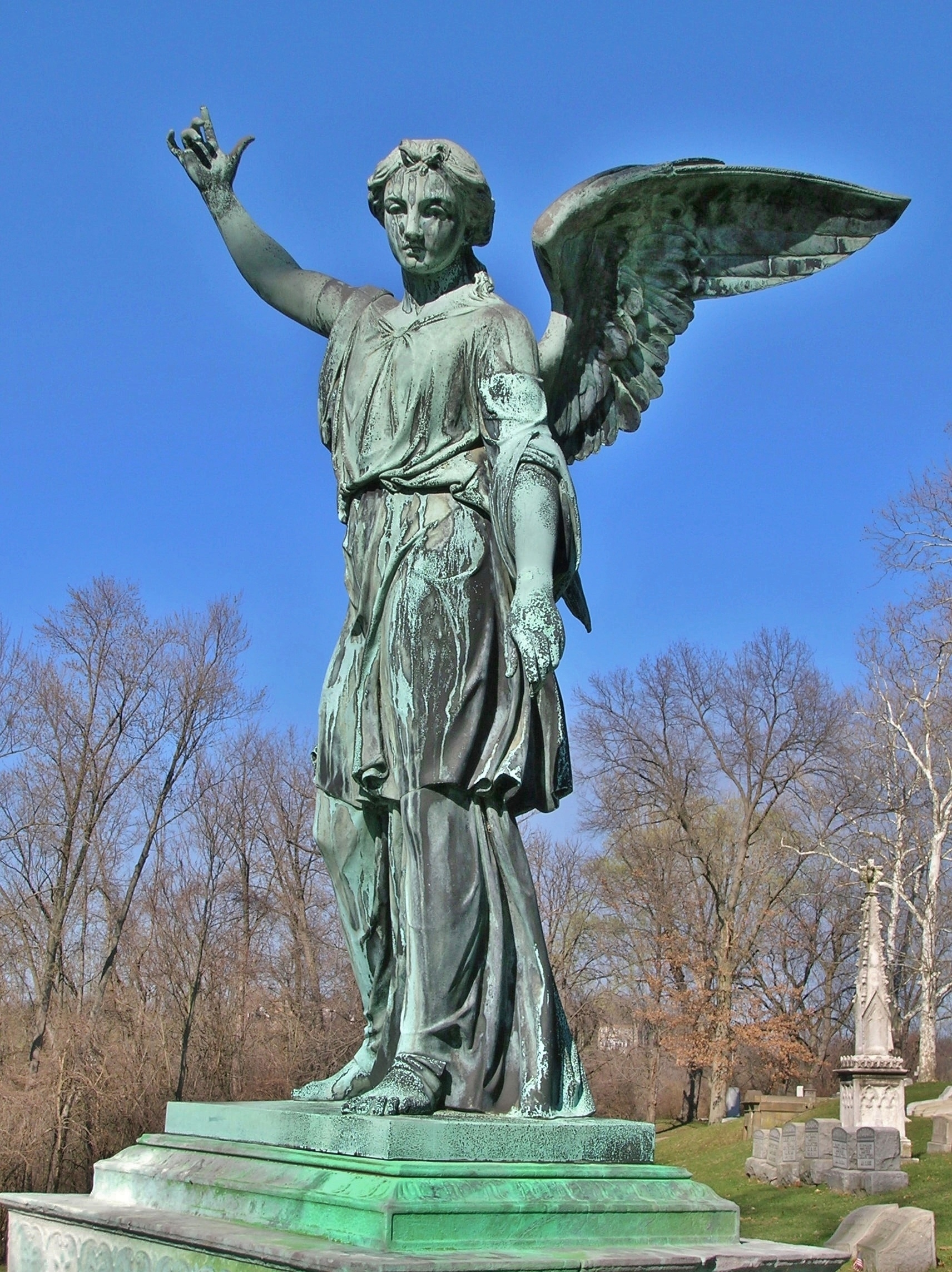
Angel of the Resurrection on James B. Hogg monument (sculpted by Henry Kirke Brown, ca. 1850)

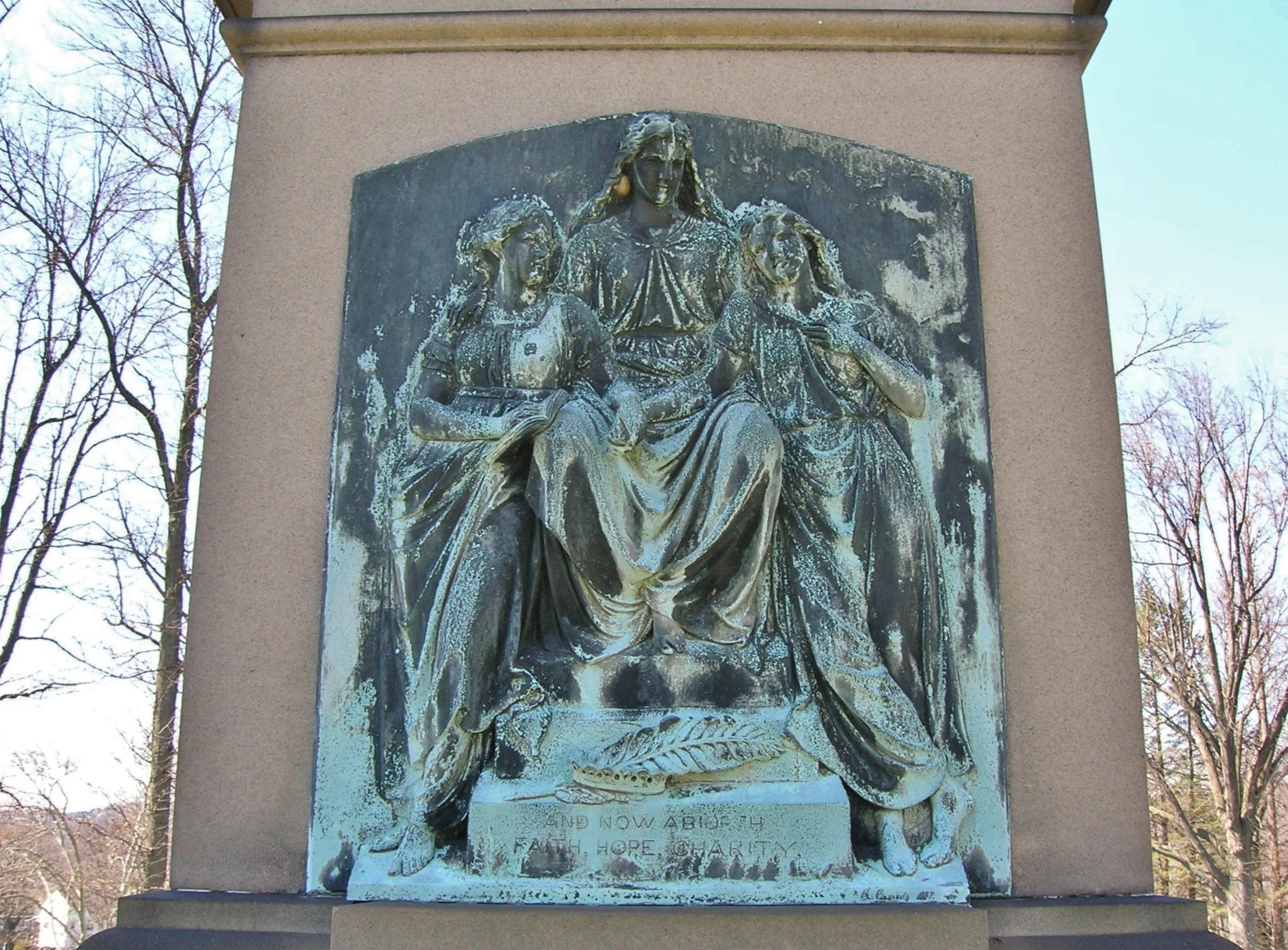
Faith, Hope and Charity on Moorhead Column (sculpted by Carl Conrads, 1877)

== See also ==
- Homewood Cemetery
- Greenwood Cemetery
- List of burial places of justices of the Supreme Court of the United States
