= Detroit Journal =

Defunct American newspaper

The Detroit Journal was a newspaper published in Detroit, Michigan from September 1, 1883, through March 23, 1922.

The Detroit Evening Journal, established by Lloyd Brezee, started as a two-cent daily with Brezee in the position of editor and C.C. Parkard as business manager. On December 6, 1883, a stock company was formed and a capital stock of $37,500 was established. By May 1884 the capital was increased to $50,000; the controlling interest of the paper was sold to Samual J. Tomlinson. Tomlinson assumed the position of editor until he retired in May 1885. William Livingstone Jr. became the proprietor and appointed Frank E. Robinson managing editor and Henry S. Harris as writing editor. Harris resigned in 1886 and was replaced by Edward G. Holden. On May 7, 1887, five hundred shares of the paper was sold to William H. Brearley, who assumed ownership of the Journal.

The Journal struggled financially until 1901; that year it was sold to a syndicate that included the future owner of the Detroit Free Press, Edward D. Stair. William H. Brearley, who had previously been the advertising manager at the Detroit News, assumed the position of managing editor. In 1908 with a majority stock purchase of the paper, Henry Stevens and Edward D. Stair took over ownership. Harry P. Hetherington became editor and held the position until his death. He was followed by T.C. Greenwood and then by Grove Patterson.

A new group of owners assumed control of the Journal in 1917, but did not organize it as a corporation until April 25, 1919. The officers and owners of the corporation were: N.C. Wright, president; H.S. Talmadge, vice president; Paul Block, secretary; and C.C. Verman, treasurer. The last printing plant of the Journal was built and completed in 1906, occupying the space to the rear of the old printing plant.

In 1922 the Journal was bought out by the Evening News Association, owner of the rival The Detroit News.

== Strike paper ==
In 1995, the name was also used to refer to a weekly newspaper put out by workers who were on strike from the current major newspapers, the Detroit Free Press, and the Detroit News. Its formal name was the Detroit Sunday Journal but it was often referred to as the Detroit Journal. The "temporary" paper ran four years until the strike finally ended in November 1997.
