= Pittsburgh Union Progress =

Strike newspaper in Pittsburgh, Pennsylvania, US

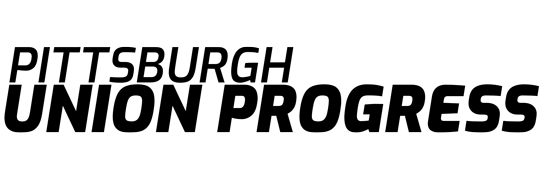
- Type: Strike paper
- Format: Online newspaper
- Editor: Bob Batz, Jr.
- Founded: October 20, 2022
- Ceased publication: November 23, 2025
- Headquarters: United Steelworkers Building
- City: Pittsburgh, Pennsylvania
- Country: United States
- Website: unionprogress.com

The Pittsburgh Union Progress (PUP) was a strike newspaper published by striking journalists of the Pittsburgh Post-Gazette in Pittsburgh, Pennsylvania from 2022 to 2025. It was formed days after Post-Gazette journalists struck in October 2022, publishing in an online-only format. The PUP published over 4,000 articles over the course of the three-year Post-Gazette strike, and ceased publication in November 2025 as the strike concluded.

== History ==
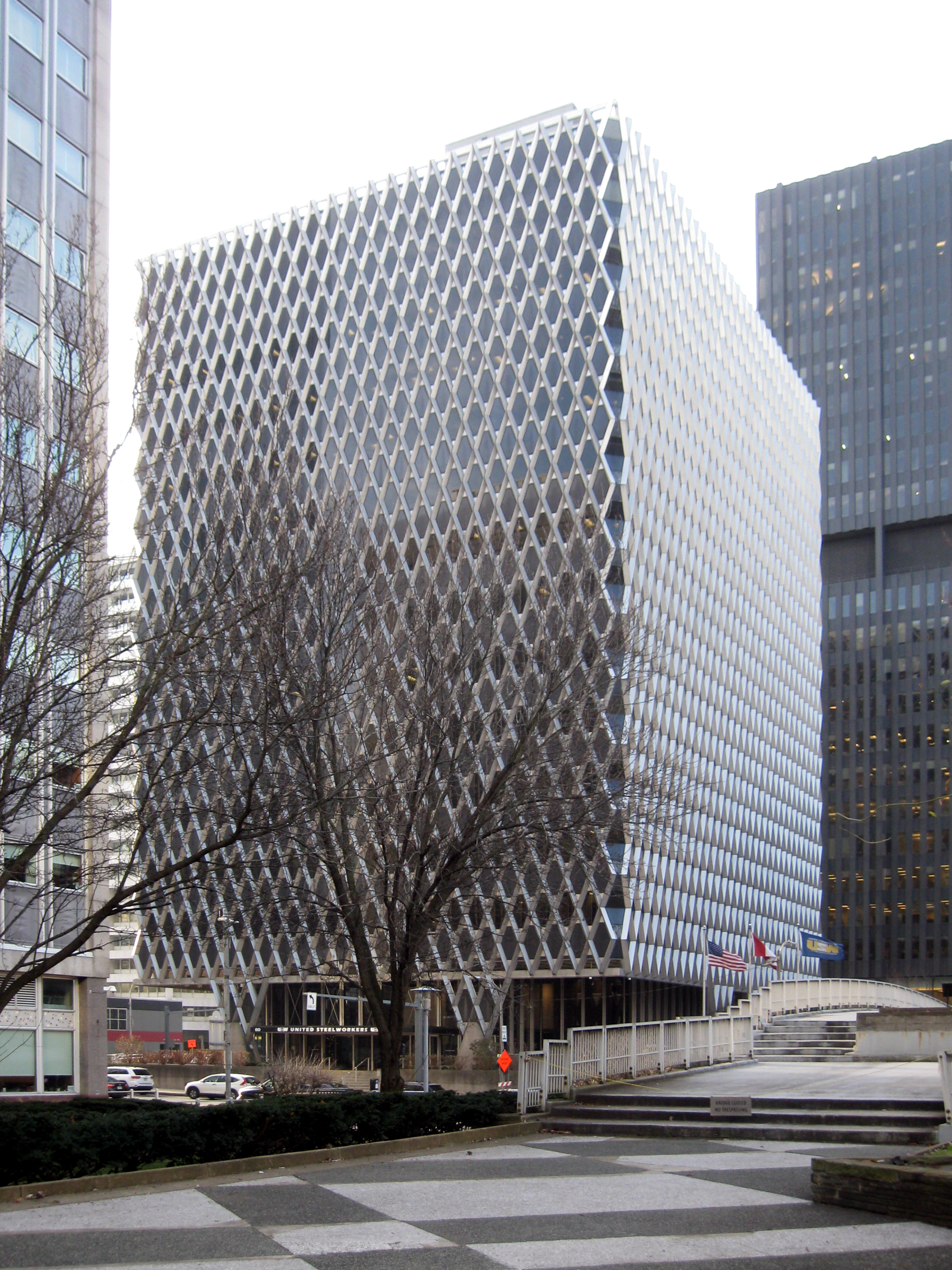
The PUP newsroom and the strike headquarters were located in the United Steelworkers Building in Downtown Pittsburgh

The current iteration of the Pittsburgh Post-Gazette began publishing in 1993, after it bought the historically larger paper The Pittsburgh Press, formerly owned by Scripps Howard. The Post-Gazette was owned by Block Communications, and had operated under a joint operating agreement with the Press since 1961. Printing and distribution were operated by the Press, and a 1992 strike by distribution workers at the Press caused both papers to stop publishing. The 1992 strike concluded after Scripps Howard sold the Press to the owners of the Post-Gazette, and the merged Post-Gazette began publishing in early 1993.

Tensions with staff at the merged Post-Gazette continued, and increased in the late 2010s with the firing of political cartoonist Rob Rogers in 2018 and a 2019 incident in the paper's newsroom involving publisher John Robinson Block. The Post-Gazette's contract with its newsroom staff, represented by the NewsGuild, expired in 2017. Post-Gazette management declared an impasse in contract negotiations in 2020. In August 2020, Post-Gazette journalists authorized a strike by a wide margin, but it was not approved by the national leadership of the NewsGuild.

Approximately 60 Post-Gazette distribution, production, and advertising staff struck in early October 2022 over changes to their healthcare plans. Journalists in the newsroom held their own strike authorization vote on October 18, which was approved by a much narrower margin than the 2020 vote. Many journalists crossed the picket line and continued working for the Post-Gazette, including many of the paper's sports reporters. The Nieman Journalism Lab described the strike as "the first newspaper strike of the digital age."

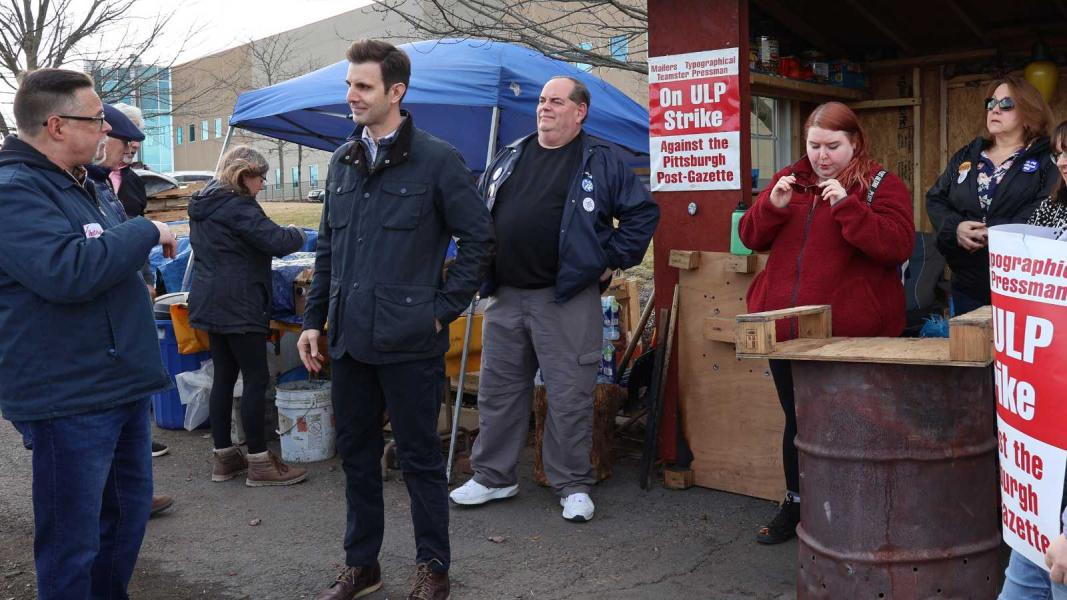
U.S. Representative Chris Deluzio visiting the picket line in February 2023

The PUP began publishing shortly after journalists went on strike, publishing stories to a site built with WordPress. The PUP was edited by Bob Batz, Jr., an associate features editor at the Post-Gazette. Beginning in December 2022, the United Steelworkers provided an office in their Downtown Pittsburgh headquarters for use as both a strike headquarters and a newsroom.

By December 2022, 45 Post-Gazette journalists were on strike, although "dozens" had crossed the picket line. The PUP launched an initiative to prevent the Post-Gazette from accessing information from sources, asking politicians and organizations to decline interviews with the Post-Gazette for the duration of the strike. Politicians honoring the pledge included Pittsburgh Mayor Ed Gainey and U.S. Representative Chris Deluzio.

In the summer of 2023, the PUP held an internship program, hosting two journalism students. In a Teen Vogue op-ed, one of the interns described the experience as unique, commenting that they believed they were "the first 'strike paper' interns ever."

The strike concluded in November 2025, and the PUP ceased publishing before staff returned to work at the Post-Gazette. The PUP published its final articles on November 23, 2025.

== Coverage ==
The PUP began with coverage of the strike itself, and expanded into daily coverage and ongoing reporting in multiple beats, including transportation and local sports.

The Pittsburgh Jewish Chronicle partnered with the PUP to cover the 2023 trial of the accused perpetrator of the Pittsburgh synagogue shooting, utilizing the expertise of both publications. The PUP featured ongoing reporting on the 2023 East Palestine, Ohio train derailment, continuing through the paper's final month of operation in November 2025.

The PUP featured coverage of high school sports in the Pittsburgh area, produced by a small number of the Post-Gazette's sports reporters who struck. The Post-Gazette's sports reporters covering professional baseball, football, and hockey crossed the picket line and did not write for the PUP.

== Legacy ==
The Post-Gazette announced in January 2026 that it would cease publication in May 2026. Block Communications wrote in a statement that the closure was due to "outdated and inflexible operational practices" from the journalists' union contract that expired in 2017.
