= WITF =

WITF may refer to:

- WITF-FM, a radio station (89.5 FM) licensed to Harrisburg, Pennsylvania, United States
- WITF-TV, a television station (channel 36 digital) licensed to Harrisburg, Pennsylvania, United States
