= Intelligencer Journal =

Daily newspaper in Lancaster, Pennsylvania, U.S.

- The April 23, 2008 frontpage of the Intelligencer Journal.
- Type: Daily, morning
- Format: Broadsheet
- Owner: Steinman family
- Publisher: Lancaster Newspapers, Inc.
- Editor: Charles Raymond Shaw
- Founded: June 17, 1794
- Ceased publication: October 15, 2014 (as Intelligencer Journal-Lancaster New Era)
- Political alignment: Center-left
- Headquarters: 8 West King Street, Lancaster, PA 17605; United States
- Circulation: 44,000
- Sister newspapers: Lancaster New Era
- ISSN: 0889-4140

The Intelligencer Journal, known locally as the Intell, was the daily, morning newspaper published by Lancaster Newspapers in Lancaster, Pennsylvania. It is the seventh-oldest newspaper in the United States, and was one of the oldest newspapers to be continually published under the same name. The Intelligencer Journal's editorial page generally leaned to the Democratic/liberal perspective. The Intelligencer merged with its sister newspaper, the Lancaster New Era, in 2009.

The combined Intelligencer Journal-Lancaster New Era was rebranded and renamed LNP in October 2014. The new incarnation of LNP debuted on October 16, 2014, with a new format and layout.

== History ==
The Lancaster Journal, was founded on June 17, 1794 by William Hamilton and Henry Wilcocks as a 4-page, weekly newspaper. In 1800, Hamilton politically aligned the Journal with the Federalists after buying out Wilcocks and receiving backing from Robert Coleman. In 1799, William Dickson founded a rival paper, the Jeffersonian Lancaster Intelligencer and Weekly Advertiser. After a fire in 1811 and Dickson's death in 1823, popularity of the Intelligencer began to diminish. In January 1820, Hamilton was succeeded by John Huss and Henry Brenner, who worked on the Journal from its inception. In July 1820, John Reynolds (father of the Civil War general) succeeded Huss and Brenner and turned the Journal into a Jacksonian paper. In 1834, Hugh Maxwell V bought the Journal from John Reynolds. Maxwell had previously owned and published the Lancaster Gazette and Port-Folio.

=== Forney and Steinman ===
In March 1837 the Intelligencer was passed to John Weiss Forney from Dickson's widow. Forney took over the Intelligencer and "turned it around". In September 1839, Forney bought the Journal from Maxwell and merged it with the Intelligencer making the Intelligencer and Journal. After Forney left Lancaster in 1845, George Sanderson ran the paper and used it to become mayor of Lancaster. During the Civil War, circulation fell due to the Intelligencer and Journal's anti-Republican tone. In August 1864, the paper was changed from a weekly to a daily, evening paper. By the end of the war, circulation was down to only a few hundred. In 1866, Andrew Jackson Steinman reluctantly took control of the paper, with co-owner Henry Smith and attorney William Uhler Hensel actually running the paper. In 1886, Hensel retired and Steinman's nephew Charles Steinman Foltz took his place. In 1909, Steinman and Foltz started the non-partisan Lancaster Morning Journal, which they merged with the Morning News creating the News Journal. Steinman's sons, John Frederick Steinman and James Hale Steinman, took over the Intelligencer and the News Journal in 1917 after the death of their father.

=== Newspaper war ===
In 1923, Paul Block, Sr. (founder of Block Communications) bought the Intelligencer's rival paper, the Lancaster New Era and "vowed to put the Intelligencer and the News Journal out of business". Block added a daily, four-page, colored comics section to the New Era. The Steinmans lowered advertising rates and started the Sunday News, the first local Sunday newspaper. Circulation of the Intelligencer increased from 6,000 to 30,000 in early 1927. The Steinmans then built a new five-story building for the paper on West King Street to show that "they were here to stay". In 1928, Block announced his surrender and offered the New Era to the Steinmans. They bought the New Era and merged the Intelligencer with the News Journal to create the Intelligencer Journal.

== "Intelligencer Journal March" ==
In 1951, George W. Luttenberger, a local bandleader, musician, and composer, wrote the "Intelligencer Journal March." Up until the 1960s, the march was played by American military bands, but eventually it fell out of favor. The march was lost until a copy of the sheet music was found in Library of Congress on microfilm.
