= Pa Pitt =

Personification of Pittsburgh

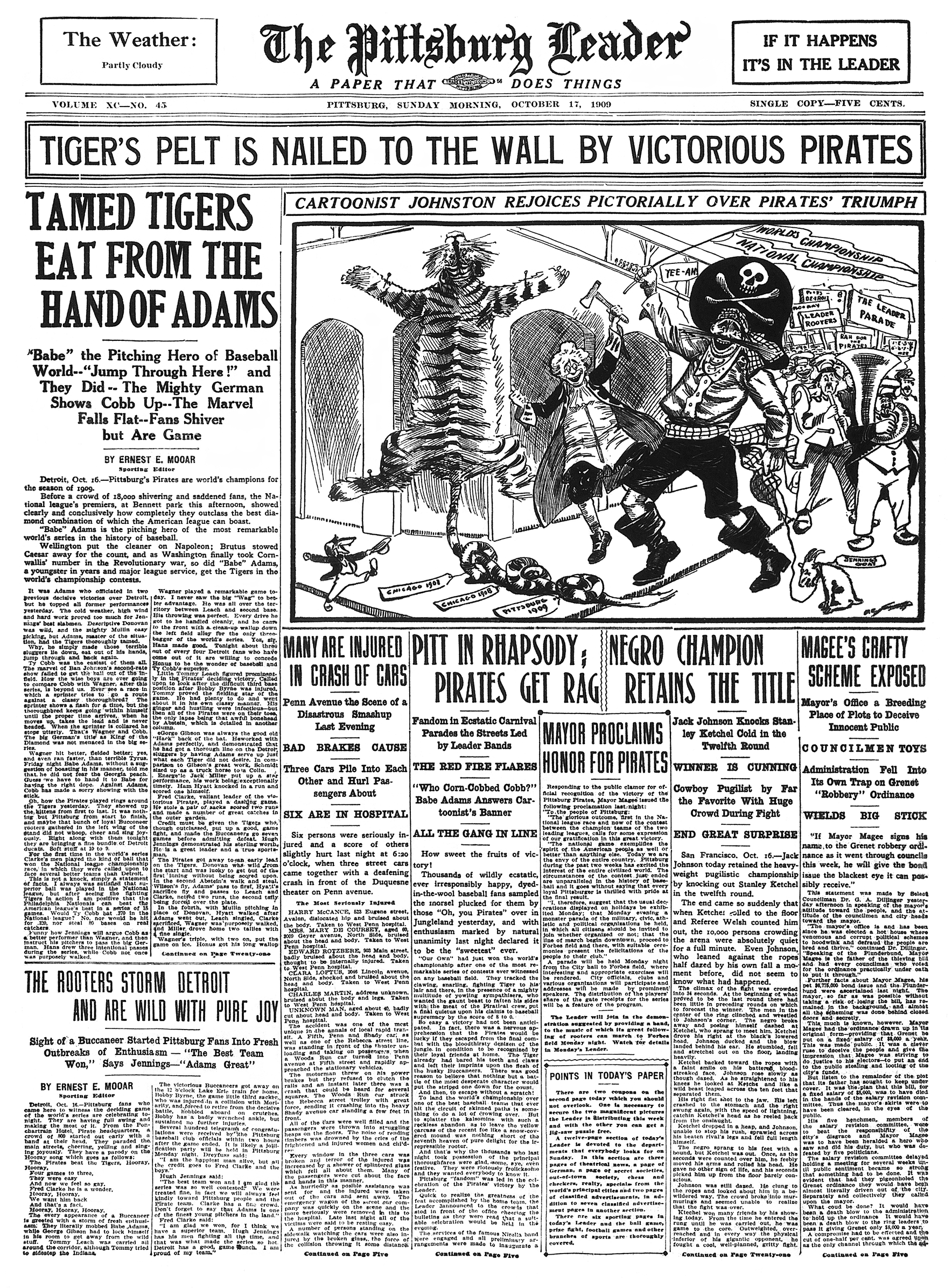
Father Pitt celebrating 1909 World Series win, drawn by Fred Johnston of the Leader.

Pa Pitt, originally "Father Pitt", has been a personification of the city of Pittsburgh, Pennsylvania since the 1890s. Numerous editorial cartoonists have depicted "Pa Pitt" over the years, notably Pittsburgh Post-Gazette cartoonist Cy Hungerford.

A 1906 article by Raymond Gros lists seven cartoonists who had already drawn a 'Father Pitt', including Fred Johnston of the Leader whom Gros credits as creating 'Father Pitt' in 1897 to replace an earlier personification, 'Miss Pittsburgh'. Historian J. Cutler Andrews credited a different Leader journalist, Arthur G. Burgoyne, with creating the character. Burgoyne himself claimed that "On November 5, 1895, Father Pitt was born. He was my offspring."
