= Pittsburgh Post-Gazette =

Newspaper in Pennsylvania, United States

- The November 2, 2018, front page of the Pittsburgh Post-Gazette, after the Pittsburgh synagogue shooting
- Type: Daily online / semi-weekly print newspaper
- Format: Broadsheet
- Owner: Venetoulis Institute for Local Journalism
- Publisher: Venetoulis Institute for Local Journalism
- President: Tracey DeAngelo
- Editor: Stan Wischnowski
- Founded: 1786; 240 years ago (as The Pittsburgh Gazette)
- Headquarters: 358 North Shore Drive; Pittsburgh, Pennsylvania
- Country: United States
- Circulation: 33,000 print circulation; 50,000 digital subscribers
- ISSN: 1068-624X
- OCLC number: 1057964643
- Website: post-gazette.com

The Pittsburgh Post-Gazette, also known simply as the PG, is the largest newspaper serving metropolitan Pittsburgh in the U.S. state of Pennsylvania. Descended from the Pittsburgh Gazette, established in 1786 as the first newspaper published west of the Allegheny Mountains, the paper formed under its present title in 1927 from the consolidation of the Pittsburgh Gazette Times and The Pittsburgh Post.

The Post-Gazette ended daily print publication in 2018 and has cut down to two print editions per week (Sunday and Thursday), going online-only the rest of the week.

In the 2010s, the editorial tone of the paper shifted from liberal to conservative, particularly after the editorial pages of the paper were consolidated in 2018 with The Blade of Toledo, Ohio. After the consolidation, Keith Burris, the pro-Trump editorial page editor of The Blade, directed the editorial pages of both papers.

Copies are sold for $4 daily (Thursdays) and $6 Sundays/Thanksgiving Day in-state. This includes Allegheny and adjacent counties. Prices are higher outside the state.

On January 7, 2026, two months after the conclusion of a yearslong strike, Block Communications announced that the newspaper would cease operations on May 3. This was averted when the newspaper was sold to the Vernoulis Institute for Local Journalism, publishers of The Baltimore Banner.

Currently, the Post-Gazette is led by President Tracey DeAngelo and Executive Editor Stan J. Wischnowski.

== History ==
=== Gazette ===
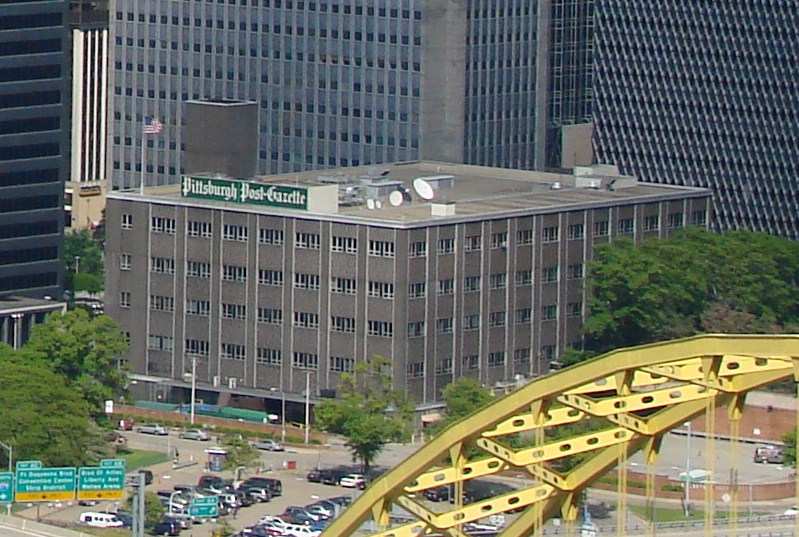
The Pittsburgh Post-Gazette Building in Downtown Pittsburgh, which housed the paper from 1962 to 2015

A timeline of the newspapers' consolidation

The Post-Gazette began its history as a four-page weekly called The Pittsburgh Gazette, first published on July 29, 1786, with the encouragement of Hugh Henry Brackenridge. It was the first newspaper published west of the Allegheny Mountains. Published by Joseph Hall and John Scull, the paper covered the start of the nation. As one of its first major articles, the Gazette published the newly adopted Constitution of the United States.

In 1820, under publishers Eichbaum and Johnston and editor Morgan Neville, the name changed to Pittsburgh Gazette and Manufacturing and Mercantile Advertiser. David MacLean bought the paper in 1822, and later reverted to the former title.

Under editor Neville B. Craig, whose service lasted from 1829 to 1841, the Gazette championed the Anti-Masonic movement. Craig turned the Gazette into the city's first daily paper, issued every afternoon except Sunday starting on July 30, 1833.

In 1844, shortly after absorbing the Advocate, the Gazette switched its daily issue time to morning. Its editorial stance at the time was conservative and strongly favoring the Whig Party. By the 1850s the Gazette was credited with helping to organize a local chapter of the new Republican Party, and with contributing to the election of Abraham Lincoln.

The paper was one of the first to suggest tensions between North and South would erupt in war.

After consolidating with the Commercial in 1877, the paper was again renamed and was then known as the Commercial Gazette.

In 1900, George T. Oliver acquired the paper, merging it six years later with The Pittsburg Times to form The Gazette Times.

=== Post ===
The Pittsburgh Post first appeared on September 10, 1842, as the Daily Morning Post. It had its origin in three pro-Democratic weeklies, the Mercury, Allegheny Democrat, and American Manufacturer, which came together through a pair of mergers in the early 1840s. The three papers had for years engaged in bitter editorial battles with the Gazette.

Like its predecessors, the Post advocated the policies of the Democratic Party. Its political opposition to the Whig and later Republican Gazette was so enduring that an eventual combination of the two rivals would have seemed unlikely.

=== Block-Hearst deal ===
The 1920s were a time of consolidation in the Pittsburgh newspaper market. In 1923, local publishers banded together to acquire and kill off the Dispatch and Leader. Four years later, William Randolph Hearst negotiated with the Olivers to purchase the morning Gazette Times and its evening sister, the Chronicle Telegraph, while Paul Block arranged to buy out the owner of the morning Post and evening Sun. After swapping the Sun in return for Hearst's Gazette Times, Block had both morning papers, which he combined to form the Post-Gazette. Hearst united the evening papers, creating the Sun-Telegraph. Both new papers debuted on August 2, 1927.

=== Joint operating agreement ===
In 1960, Pittsburgh had three daily papers: the Post-Gazette in the morning, and the Pittsburgh Press and the Pittsburgh Sun-Telegraph in the evening and on Sunday. The Post-Gazette bought the Sun-Telegraph and moved into the Sun-Telegraph's Grant Street offices.

The Post-Gazette tried to publish a Sunday paper to compete with the Sunday Press but it was not profitable; rising costs in general were challenging the company's bottom line. In November 1961, the Post-Gazette entered into an agreement with the Pittsburgh Press Company to combine their production and advertising sales operations. The Post-Gazette owned and operated its own news and editorial departments, but production and distribution of the paper was handled by the larger Press office. This agreement stayed in place for over 30 years.

The agreement gave the Post-Gazette a new home in the Press building, a comfortable upgrade from the hated "Sun-Telly barn". Constructed for the Press in 1927 and expanded with a curtain wall in 1962, the building served as the Post-Gazette headquarters until 2015.

=== Strike, consolidation, new competition ===
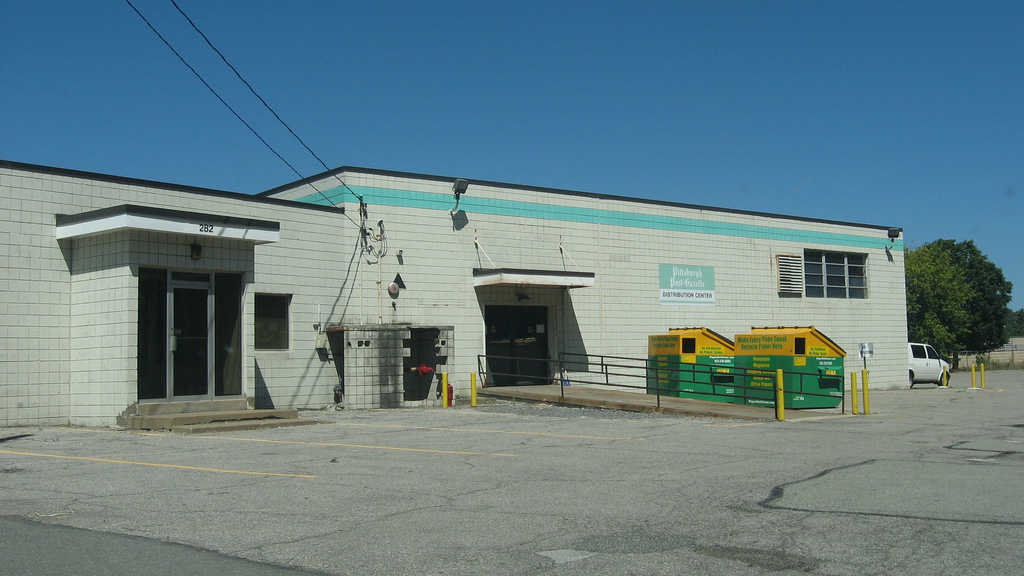
The distribution center of the Pittsburgh Post-Gazette in Findlay Township

On May 17, 1992, a strike by workers for the Press shut down publication of the Press; the joint operating agreement meant that the Post-Gazette also ceased to publish. During the strike, the Scripps Howard company sold the Press to the Block family, owners of the Post-Gazette. The Blocks did not resume printing the Press, and when the labor issue was resolved and publishing resumed, the Post-Gazette became the city's major paper, under the full masthead name Pittsburgh Post-Gazette Sun-Telegraph/The Pittsburgh Press. The Block ownership did not take this opportunity to address labor costs, which had led to sale of the Press. This would come back to haunt them and lead to financial problems (see "Financial Challenges" below).

During the strike, publisher Richard Mellon Scaife expanded his paper, the Greensburg Tribune-Review, based in the county seat of adjoining Westmoreland County, where it had published for years. While maintaining the original paper in its facilities in Greensburg, he expanded it with a new Pittsburgh edition to serve the city and its suburbs. Scaife named this paper the Pittsburgh Tribune-Review. Scaife has invested significant amounts of capital into upgraded facilities, separate offices and newsroom on Pittsburgh's North Side and a state of the art production facility in Marshall Township north of Pittsburgh in Allegheny County. Relations between the Post-Gazette and Tribune-Review, during its existence as a local print publication, were often competitive and frequently hostile, given Scaife's longstanding distaste for what he considered the Blocks' liberalism.

On November 14, 2011, the Post-Gazette revived the Pittsburgh Press as an afternoon online newspaper. On February 12, 2014, the paper purchased a new distribution facility in suburban Findlay Township, Pennsylvania. In 2015 the paper moved into a new, state-of-the-art office building on the North Shore on a portion of the former site of Three Rivers Stadium, ending 53 years in the former Press building and more than two centuries in Downtown. Block Communications sold the downtown Post-Gazette building in 2019 to DiCicco Development, Inc., a developer headquartered in Moon Township, for $13.25 million. As of late 2022, DiCicco Development was still deciding what type of use might work best on the property.

=== 2020s strike and planned shutdown ===
On October 6, 2022, the advertising, distribution and production workers at the Post-Gazette went on strike. On October 18, the newsroom workers joined the strike. The National Labor Relations Board (NLRB) also pursued a case against the paper charging unfair practices. As of March 2023, the strike had not been settled and the NLRB case was pending before an administrative law judge. As of October 2023, the unions were still on strike against the Post-Gazette. In April 2024, the NLRB announced it was authorizing a request from the newspaper's unions to seek a temporary injunction against the Post-Gazette's ownership for violating workers' labor rights. The striking workers published an online strike paper, Pittsburgh Union Progress.

In November 2025, the Third Circuit Court of Appeals upheld the earlier finding of an administrative law judge that PG Publishing, the owners of the Post-Gazette, had violated federal labor law by negotiating in bad faith with the paper's union, as well as upholding the remedy that affected workers be compensated for any loss in earnings and benefits, plus interest, that accrued as a result of PG Publishing's actions. The strike ended on November 24, 2025, as the striking workers returned to work after striking for three years. The Union's striking paper also closed down on November 23, just before workers returned.

On January 7, 2026, Block Communications announced that the Post-Gazette would publish its final edition and cease operations on May 3, citing the November 2025 judgment against the company. At the same time, Block was preparing to liquidate its broadcast business altogether and had already announced the sale of its television stations (including WDRB in Louisville, WAND in Decatur, and Your Hometown Stations in Lima) to Gray Media months before the planned shutdown. This planned closure would've left Pittsburgh as the largest city and media market in the country without a newspaper. Block Communications would later face a similar fate to its former sister newspaper in its hometown of Toledo in September of that year, when it was announced that The Blade, the lone remaining newspaper in the company following the sale of the Post-Gazette, would also cease operations at the end of the year if no buyers were found, effectively exiting the newspaper business and leaving that city without a newspaper, just like Pittsburgh would've been.

=== Acquisition ===
Two weeks before the planned closure, the Baltimore-based nonprofit Venetoulis Institute for Local Journalism reached an agreement in April 2026 to buy the paper's assets for an undisclosed sum. The Venetoulis Institute was chosen by the Block Communications board over higher bidders, including Alden Global Capital. Bob Cohn, president and CEO of the Venetoulis Institute, said he plans to rehire "a large number" of those employed by the Post-Gazette, which will be reconstituted as a nonprofit. Editorial decisions will continue to be made locally. However, as a nonprofit, the paper's editorial page will no longer be able to support or oppose candidates for office.

After ownership was officially transferred on May 4, 2026, about half of the newsroom's staff was laid off, including longtime music reporter Scott Mervis. President Tracey DeAngelo and executive editor Stan Wischnowski were retained. Some of the fired journalists started a new nonprofit cooperatively-owned news outlet, the Pittsburgh Progress.

== Partnerships and sponsorships ==
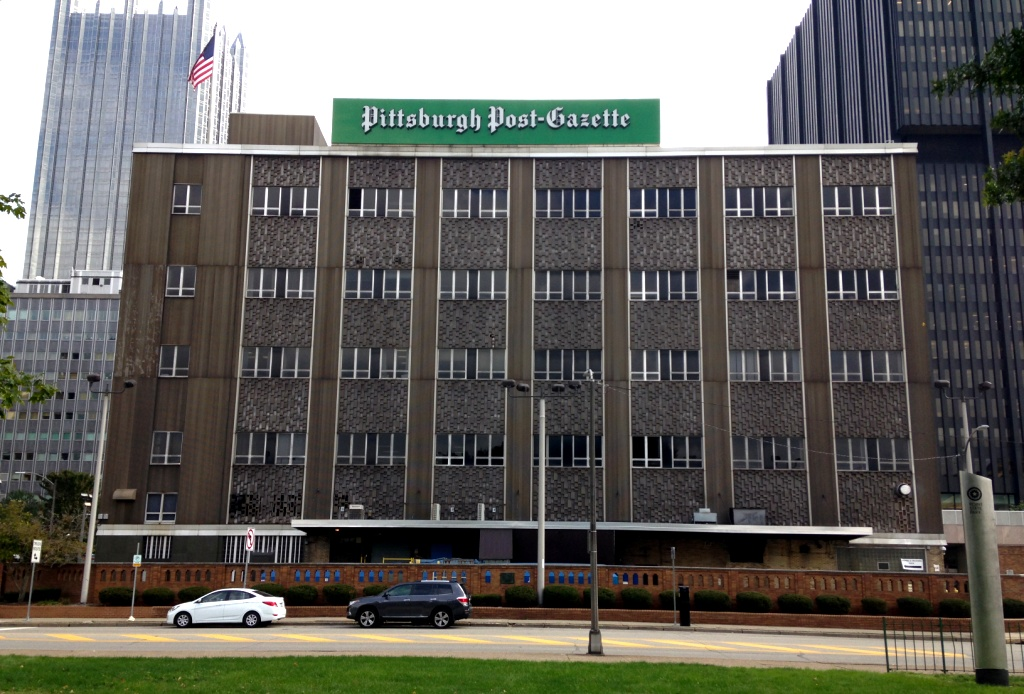
The Post-Gazette building in October 2015

The newspaper sponsored a 23,000 seat outdoor amphitheater in Burgettstown, Pennsylvania, the "Post-Gazette Pavilion", although it is still often referred to as "Star Lake", based on the original name, "Star Lake Amphitheater", and later "Coca-Cola Star Lake Amphitheater" under the former sponsor. They gave up naming rights in 2010. First Niagara Bank, which had entered the Pittsburgh market the year before after acquiring National City branches from Pittsburgh-based PNC Financial Services, took over the naming rights to the facility.

The newspaper once had ventures in television. In 1957, the Post-Gazette partnered with the H. Kenneth Brennen family, local radio owners, to launch WIIC-TV (now WPXI) as the area's first full-time NBC affiliate. The Post-Gazette and the Brennens sold off the station to current owner Cox Enterprises in 1964. Although the Post-Gazette and WPXI have on occasion had some news partnerships, the Post-Gazette's primary news partner is now the local CBS owned-and-operated station KDKA-TV.

In 2019, the Pittsburgh Post-Gazette was a founding member of Spotlight PA, an investigative reporting partnership focused on Pennsylvania.

== Financial challenges ==
When John Craig handed editorial reign to David Shribman in 2003, Craig told Shribman that the paper was in terrible financial shape. It was around the time of Hanukkah, and Shribman quipped, "It seemed there was only enough oil in this newspaper to keep the light on for one year." In September 2006 the paper disclosed that it was experiencing financial challenges, largely related to its labor costs. The paper also disclosed it had not been profitable since printing had resumed in 1993. As a result of these issues, the paper considered a number of options, including putting the paper up for sale. In August 2018 the Post-Gazette ceased publishing daily. It cut down to online editions on Tuesdays and Saturdays and print editions the remaining days of the week. In October 2019, the paper further reduced its paper editions to Thursdays, Fridays and Sundays. In March 2021, the paper cut down again, getting rid of the Friday edition.

When Block Communications announced it was shutting down the newspaper in January 2026, company officials said the newspaper had lost more than $350 million during the past 20 years.

Stewart Bainum, founder of the Venetoulis Institute, told NPR in April 2026 that the nonprofit has pledged about $30 million annually for five years to operate the Post-Gazette, and wants to reach a "break even" point for revenue and expenses for the newspaper.

== Controversies ==
=== Firing of cartoonist ===
In June 2018, the Post-Gazette fired its long-time editorial cartoonist, Rob Rogers, a previous Pulitzer Prize for Editorial Cartooning finalist who had worked at the paper for 25 years, having joined the paper in 1993 and worked under four supervising editors. The firing came in the context of increasing support for President Donald Trump and political conservatism on the Post-Gazette editorial page. Pittsburgh mayor William Peduto (who was both a friend of Rogers' and had been lampooned in his cartoons) called the paper's firing of Rogers "disappointing" and said it sent "the wrong message about press freedoms." The firing was strongly criticized by the Newspaper Guild of Pittsburgh and the National Cartoonists Society. The Association of American Editorial Cartoonists said in a statement: "It's as simple as this: Rogers was fired for refusing to do cartoons extolling Trump. Let that sink in." The paper said that Rogers' dismissal "has little to do with politics, ideology or Donald Trump" but did not provide details. Rogers wrote in The New York Times that the paper's new management had decided, in the lead-up to his firing, that his cartoons satirizing Trump "were 'too angry.'" Rogers said that while editors had previously rejected (or "spiked") an average of two to three of his cartoons each year, under a new supervisor he had 19 cartoons or cartoon ideas killed in the first six months of 2018.

Four months after Rogers was fired, the Post-Gazette hired conservative editorial cartoonist Steve Kelley as Rogers' replacement. After being fired, Rogers' comics continued to be published through Andrews McMeel Syndication. As a freelancer, Rogers was named as a finalist for the 2019 Pulitzer Prize in editorial cartooning, with the committee citing his "provocative illustrations that channeled cultural and historical references with expert artistry and an eye for hypocrisy and injustice."

=== Sanctioning of reporter amid George Floyd protests ===
In 2020, the Post-Gazette prohibited its reporter Alexis Johnson from covering the George Floyd protests. The Post-Gazette said that Johnson, an African American, had shown bias by making a tweet that highlighted extensive littering from a Kenny Chesney concert tailgate. The pulling of Johnson from the story prompted an outcry from journalists, including the Newspaper Guild of Pittsburgh and many of Johnson's Post-Gazette colleagues.

== Awards ==
=== Pulitzer Prizes ===
The Post-Gazette won Pulitzer Prizes in 1938, 1998, and 2019. Photographer Morris Berman maintained that the paper would have also won a Pulitzer in 1964, had it chosen to run the iconic photo of Y. A. Tittle that he took at Pitt Stadium, which would go on to win awards, hang in the Pro Football Hall of Fame, and be used for the back cover of Tittle's autobiography and in a Miller Beer High-Life commercial in 2005.

In 1938, Ray Sprigle won the Pulitzer Prize for Reporting for his investigation revealing that newly appointed Supreme Court Justice Hugo Black had been a member of the Ku Klux Klan.

Staff photographer Martha Rial won the 1998 Pulitzer Prize for Spot News Photography for her photographs of Rwandan and Burundian refugees.

Photographer John Kaplan won the 1992 Pulitzer Prize for Feature Photography for a series of photo essays on 21-year-olds, which was published in the Post-Gazette and two other papers of the Block Newspapers group. This award cited Block Newspapers rather than the Post-Gazette specifically.

The Post-Gazette won the 2019 Pulitzer Prize for Breaking News Reporting for its coverage of the Pittsburgh synagogue shooting. The paper was praised for its "immersive, compassionate coverage."

=== Other awards ===
In 1997, Bill Moushey won the National Press Club’s Freedom of Information Award on a series investigating the Federal Witness Protection Program and was a finalist for the Pulitzer.

The Post-Gazette also won the Wilbur Award from the Religion Communicators Council (RCC) in 2017 for religion editor Peter Smith's work, Silent Sanctuaries. Smith, Stephanie Strasburg, and Shelly Bradbury were finalists for the 2020 Pulitzer Prize for Local Reporting for an investigation into sexual abuse in Pennsylvania's Amish and Mennonite communities.

Michael Sallah, Michael Korsh and Evan Robinson-Johnson of the Post-Gazette, with ProPublica, won the 2023 George Polk Award for medical reporting for a series on Philips Respironics' efforts to continue marketing their breathing machines despite knowing they were dangerous to users.

== Endorsement ==
The Post-Gazette historically sided with modern liberalism in its editorial stance. However, it turned more conservative in the 2010s, especially following the 2018 consolidation of its editorial department with that of longtime sister newspaper The Blade of Toledo, Ohio, and the appointment of The Blade's editorial page editor, Keith Burris, a frequent defender of Donald Trump, as the Post-Gazette's editorial page editor. Burris assumed the additional position of executive editor of the Post-Gazette in 2019. In 2020, the Post-Gazette endorsed Trump's reelection bid, making him the first Republican presidential candidate since Richard Nixon in 1972 whom the paper had endorsed.

== See also ==
- Chronicle-Telegraph Cup
- Tom Barnes
- Al Helfer
- Cy Hungerford
- James O'Toole
- Pittsburgh Tribune-Review
- Martha Rial, 1998 Pulitzer Prize winner
- Dennis Roddy
- Bob Smizik
- Bill Steigerwald
- Y. A. Tittle photo
- Clarke Thomas
- Adriana E. Ramírez
- Pittsburgh Union Progress

== Bibliography and further reading ==
- Andrews, J. Cutler (1936). Pittsburgh's Post-Gazette: The First Newspaper West of the Alleghenies. Boston: Chapman & Grimes. hdl:2027/mdp.39015011226290.
- Thomas, Clarke M. (2005). Front-Page Pittsburgh: Two Hundred Years of the Post-Gazette. Pittsburgh: University of Pittsburgh Press. ISBN 0-8229-4248-8.
- "Daily and Sunday Newspaper Circulation". Newspapers First. March 31, 2006. Archived from the original on March 12, 2007.
- "2007 Top 100 Daily Newspapers in the U.S. by Circulation" (PDF). BurrellesLuce. March 31, 2007. Archived from the original (PDF) on December 2, 2017.
