= WYPM =

Satellite of WITF-FM, Harrisburg
- Chambersburg, Pennsylvania; United States
- Broadcast area: South Central Pennsylvania
- Frequency: 93.3 MHz
- Branding: 93-3 WYPM

Programming
- Language: English
- Format: Public radio; news/talk
- Affiliations: BBC World Service; National Public Radio

Ownership
- Owner: WITF, Inc.

History
- Former call signs: WCUM-FM (1948–1976); WPVM (1976–1977); WJSE (1977–1982); WROG (1982–2009)
- Former frequencies: 102.9 MHz (1948–2008)

Technical information
- Licensing authority: FCC
- Facility ID: 49384
- Class: A
- ERP: 350 watts
- HAAT: 412 meters (1,352 ft)
- Transmitter coordinates: 40°02′54.30″N 77°45′0.90″W

Links
- Public license information: Public file; LMS
- Website: www.witf.org

WYPM (93.3 FM) is a non-commercial, public radio station that is licensed to Chambersburg, Pennsylvania, United States. The station is owned by WITF, Inc., and simulcasts the NPR talk and news programming of WITF-FM in Harrisburg.

== History ==
The Federal Communications Commission granted The Tower Realty Company a construction permit for the station on August 18, 1948, awarding it the WCUM-FM call sign. The new station was assigned to 102.9 MHz in Cumberland, Maryland. The FCC granted the station the authority to begin broadcasting starting on October 20, 1948, followed by its first license on November 2, 1951.

The station was sold several times between the late 1950s and the late 1970s. The first sale was made from The Tower Realty Company to Allegany County Broadcasting Corporation, effective April 1, 1959, then to Group "B" Broadcasting Company, Inc., effective July 1, 1965, then to WCUM, Inc., effective May 1, 1968, then to WCUM Radio, Inc., effective October 31, 1974, and then to Greater Cumberland Radio Broadcasting, Inc., effective August 19, 1977. The station's call sign was changed to WPVM on March 2, 1976, followed by a change to WJSE on October 13.

This station has broadcast a country music format since 1978. Greater Cumberland Radio Broadcasting, Inc. sold the station on June 30, 1982, to Community Service Broadcasters, Inc.

On November 1, the station's call sign was changed to WROG.

The station was sold to Tschudy Communications Corporation effective August 24, 1987, followed by another sale to Northeast Broadcasting Group on July 19, 1991.

The station was sold to Broadcast Communications, Inc., the sale was completed on January 8, 2004.

On December 20, 2006, Broadcast Communications, Inc. was granted a construction permit by the FCC to upgrade the facilities of WROG from Class A to Class B; however, the corporation decided to change the station's community of license from Cumberland, Maryland to Chambersburg, Pennsylvania. On July 30, 2007, the FCC granted the request, modifying the construction permit. The new allocation in Chambersburg was Class A.

On October 2, the FCC granted a modification to the construction permit requested by Broadcast Communications, Inc. to change the new allocation in Chambersburg from Channel 275 (102.9 MHz) to Channel 227 (93.3 MHz) to avoid requiring WRZO-LP on 102.9 MHz in Chambersburg to shut down and move to a new frequency.

On July 31, 2008, WROG broadcasting ended from its Cumberland studios. WROG fell silent and the owners of WROG began removing equipment ahead of the station's move to Chambersburg. Broadcasting Communications, Inc. filed a Silent Notification with the FCC on August 1, with an expiration date of February 6, 2009.

On September 15, 2008, Broadcast Communications sold WROG to WITF, Inc., for $875,000. The sale was completed on January 8. During the sale, the FCC granted the station a new license with the new facilities in Chambersburg effective December 2.

WITF, Inc. launched "WYPM 93.3 FM Trusted Information from WITF" programming on January 9, 2009. On January 15, the WROG call sign was changed to WYPM. On June 25, 2012, WITF-FM and WYPM switched to an all-news and information format.
