= The Pittsburg Times =

- Type: Daily newspaper
- Founder: Robert P. Nevin
- Founded: 2 February 1880
- Ceased publication: 30 April 1906
- Political alignment: Republican
- Language: English
- City: Pittsburgh, Pennsylvania, U.S.
- Country: United States
- Sister newspapers: The Pittsburg Daily News

The Pittsburg (Note: The name of Pittsburgh was spelled with and without the h in the 1800s and the early 1900s. The newspaper's style was to omit the h.) Times was a morning daily newspaper published in Pittsburgh, Pennsylvania, from 1880 to 1906. It was a predecessor of The Gazette Times, which in turn was succeeded by the present-day Pittsburgh Post-Gazette.

== History ==
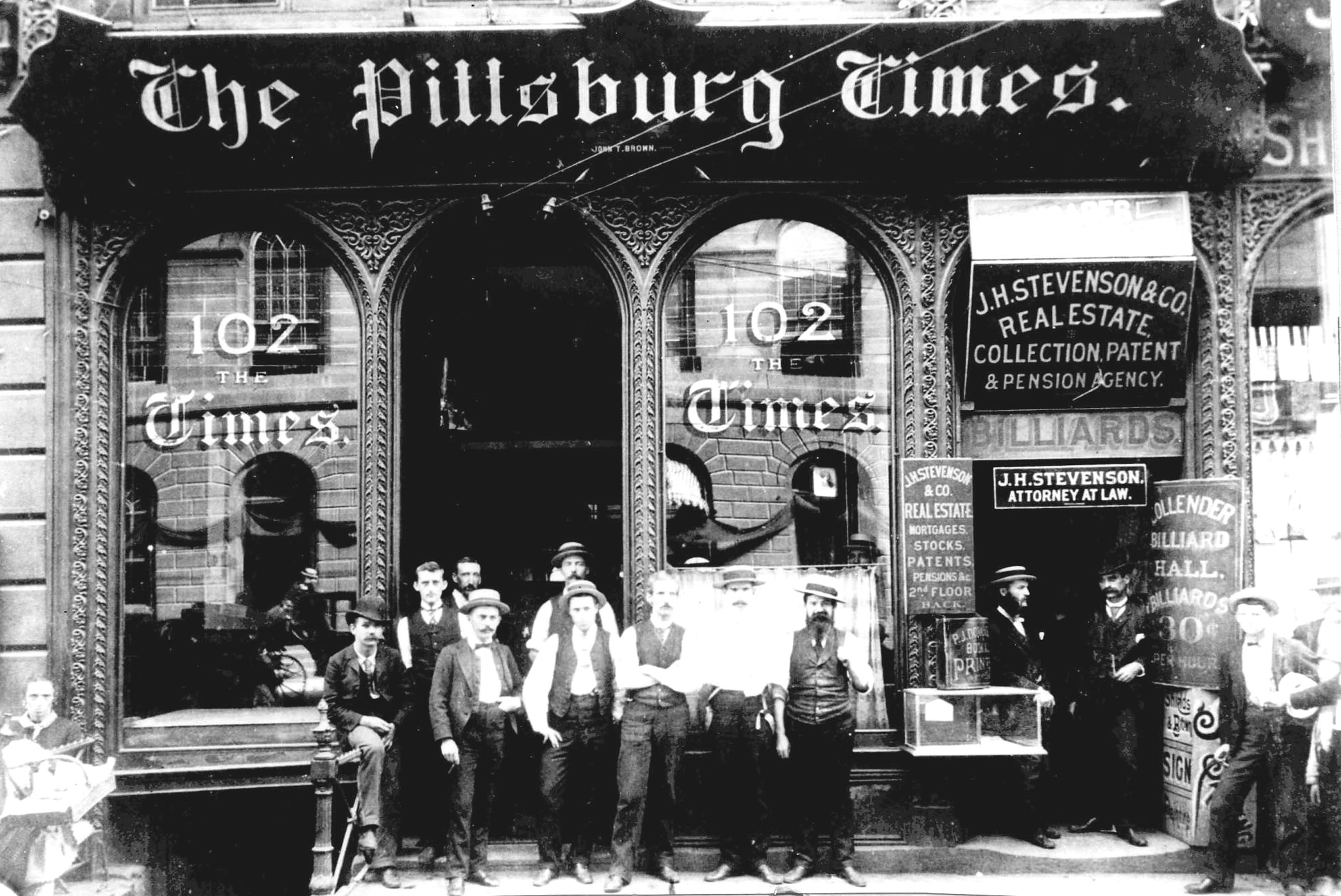
The newspaper's Office and staff in 1885

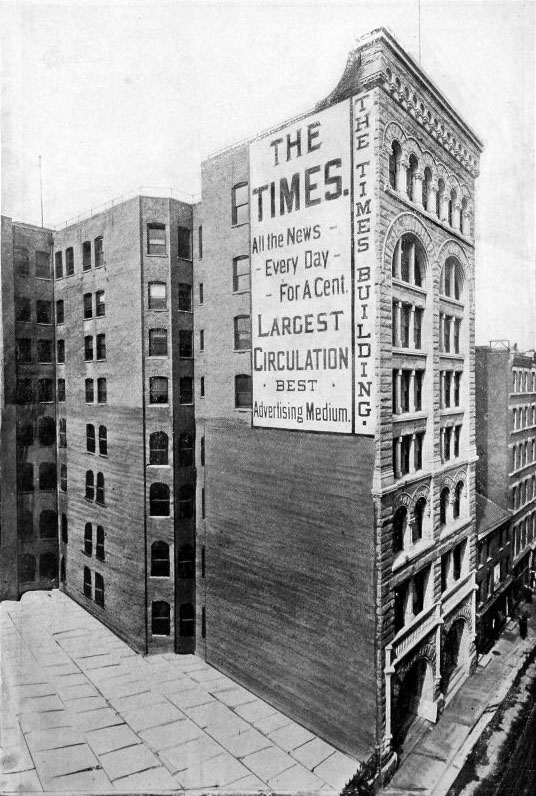
The Pittsburg Times Building in the 1890s

Pittsburgh newspaper consolidation timeline

The Times began publication on 2 February 1880, with Pittsburgh Leader veteran Robert P. Nevin as founder, proprietor and editor. It was issued every morning except Sunday and was Republican in politics.

In 1884, Nevin sold out to a company headed by local political boss Christopher Magee. The new publishers attracted subscribers by cutting the price of an issue from two cents to a penny, and by the end of the decade, reported a daily circulation exceeding that of the city's other morning papers.

Having outgrown a series of modest quarters, the Times moved in 1892 to its new eight-story Times Building, designed by Frederick J. Osterling in Richardsonian Romanesque style. The structure still stands in downtown Pittsburgh's Fourth Avenue Historic District.

The Pittsburg Daily News was launched in 1896 as the sister newspaper and evening counterpart of the morning Times. Half a decade later it was bought and absorbed by the city's leading evening paper, The Pittsburg Press.

In 1906, five years after Magee's death, George T. Oliver bought the Times and merged it with the morning paper he already owned, The Pittsburgh Gazette, to form The Gazette Times. The merged publications were compatible in their conservatism, restraint from sensationalism, and Republican political bent. Prior to consolidation, both papers had a similar daily circulation of about 70,000.

== Anti-Masonic paper ==
An earlier unrelated Pittsburgh Times existed roughly contemporaneously with the national Anti-Masonic movement of the late 1820s and the 1830s. Founded in 1829 as the (Anti-Masonic) Examiner, it became the Times in January 1831.

The paper was established in opposition to Freemasonry and for most of its existence catered to "those who prefer the Supremacy of the Laws to the domination of the Lodge." It was issued on a weekly basis, with a short-lived daily edition in 1837.

It discontinued publication on 17 April 1839, transferring its subscription list and accounts to the Gazette.
