= The Gazette Times =

Defunct newspaper in Pittsburgh, Pennsylvania

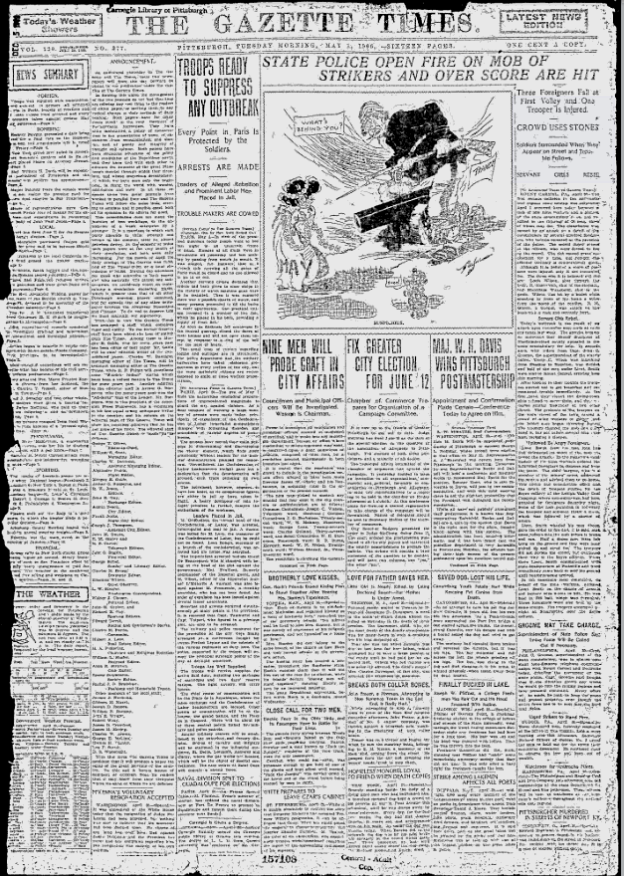
- The front page of the first issue of the Gazette Times (May 1, 1906)
- Type: Daily newspaper
- Founder: George T. Oliver
- Founded: May 1, 1906
- Ceased publication: July 31, 1927
- Political alignment: Republican
- City: Pittsburgh, Pennsylvania
- Country: United States
- Sister newspapers: Chronicle Telegraph
- OCLC number: 2261426

The Gazette Times, later published as the Pittsburgh Gazette Times, was a daily morning newspaper in Pittsburgh, Pennsylvania, published from 1906 to 1927. It was formed by the consolidation of The Pittsburgh Gazette and The Pittsburg Times, both owned by businessman and politician George T. Oliver.

The newspaper continued the Gazette's Republican political orientation and its opposition to sensationalist journalism. Under Oliver, the paper identified itself with the Progressive Era ideal of "clean journalism", which emphasized editorial restraint and a civic role for the press. Historian Caroline Newberg has examined the Gazette Times as an example of the tensions that could arise between those ideals and the political interests of a newspaper's owner.

After Oliver's death in 1919, the Gazette Times and its evening sister paper, the Chronicle Telegraph, passed to his sons George S. and Augustus K. Oliver. In 1927, William Randolph Hearst purchased the two Oliver newspapers. Through an exchange with publisher Paul Block, Hearst retained the evening paper while Block acquired the Gazette Times and combined it with the Pittsburgh Post. The resulting Pittsburgh Post-Gazette first appeared on August 2, 1927.

== History ==
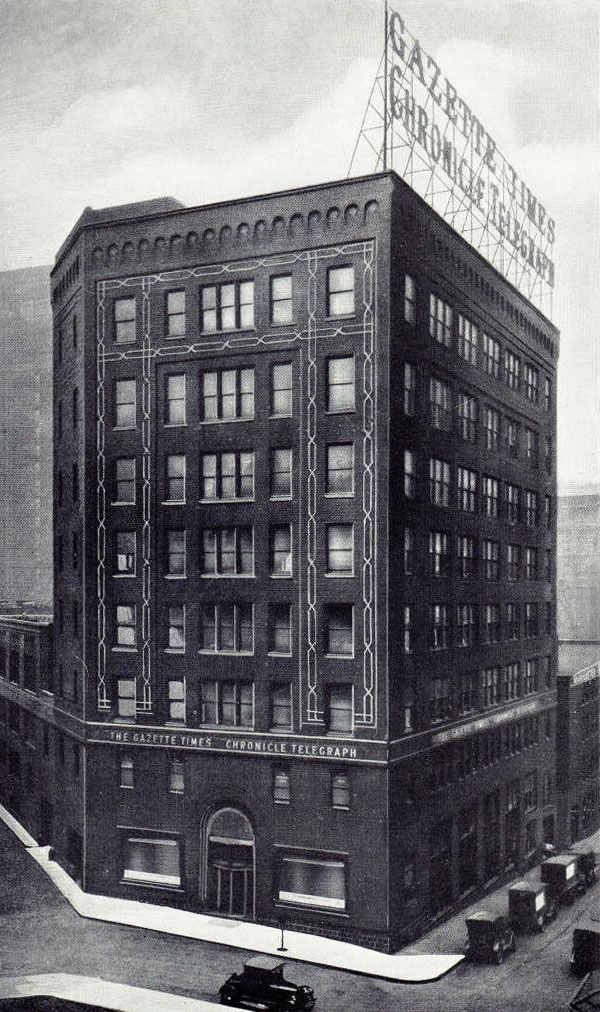
The Gazette Times and Chronicle Telegraph building at Gazette Square

=== Formation and Oliver ownership ===
In June 1900, George T. Oliver led the purchase of the Pittsburgh Commercial Gazette, one of the city's oldest newspapers. Oliver subsequently restored the shorter Gazette name and sought to retain the paper's established middle- and upper-class readership and Republican identity.

Oliver acquired the competing morning Pittsburg Times in 1906 and consolidated it with the Gazette. The first issue of The Gazette Times appeared on May 1, 1906. The two predecessor papers had similar conservative and Republican editorial traditions. The consolidation also placed the new morning newspaper under common ownership with Oliver's evening Chronicle Telegraph.

The Gazette Times subsequently expanded its news service, supplementing its existing coverage with material from the United Press and International News Service. It also used stars in its masthead to indicate changes of edition, a practice which J. Cutler Andrews wrote was later widely copied by other American newspapers.

The merger initially produced a substantial increase in circulation. According to a later history of the newspaper, circulation briefly reached about 140,000 in 1907. An advertisement published by the Gazette Times in the newspaper trade journal Editor & Publisher claimed an average daily circulation of 120,337 for May 1906.

=== Editorial character ===
Oliver had described the Gazette at the time of his 1900 purchase as a "clean paper" and pledged that it would remain Republican while favoring news that encouraged what he considered good citizenship and the advancement of Pittsburgh. Newberg places this program within the broader Progressive Era movement for "clean journalism", which opposed sensationalism and argued that newspapers should exercise moral judgment over the material they presented to readers.

The paper retained a generally conservative editorial reputation. When it marked an anniversary in 1911, the rival Pittsburgh Leader described it as Pittsburgh's most conservative newspaper.

Andrews describes a strong aversion to self-promotion at the paper. Oliver reportedly became angry when his photograph was published in the Gazette Times for the first time, requiring much of the staff to persuade him that the editor had acted properly. The newspaper derided conspicuously self-promotional rivals as practitioners of "trombone journalism," on one occasion satirizing the practice by printing a series of purported testimonials to its own importance. The parody included supposed endorsements from Alfonso XIII of Spain and the "Grand Lama of Tibet".

The newspaper's editorial staff was divided among a number of specialized departments. Greater Pittsburgh was divided into districts for city reporters, with additional reporters assigned when major stories developed; copy editors condensed and corrected reports and were expected to remove personal bias before publication. Separate editors oversaw such areas as drama, literature, finance, sports, society, and the Sunday edition. In 1911 the paper also established an art department equipped for photography and photoengraving.

Even so, Oliver's simultaneous roles as publisher, industrialist and Republican politician complicated matters. He entered the United States Senate in 1909 while continuing to own the newspaper. Newberg argues that the Gazette Times staff used the conventions of clean journalism to reconcile their professed journalistic ethics with their employer's political interests. She examines, among other examples, the paper's handling of political controversies involving Oliver in 1909 and 1911. In the latter case, the Gazette Times summarized accusations concerning Republican campaign funds and printed a letter favorable to Oliver, while omitting some of the broader allegations emphasized by The New York Times.

=== Gazette Square ===
In 1914, Pittsburgh City Council named the intersection of Grant Boulevard, Pentland Street and Tunnel Street "Gazette Square" while a new headquarters for the Gazette Times and Chronicle Telegraph was under construction there. By February 1915, the papers were advertising their new quarters at Gazette Square.

The eight-story building occupied an entire block. A 1916 Pittsburgh guide described its top floor as a composing room equipped with 30 linotype machines and characterized the plant as one of the most modern newspaper facilities in the United States.

=== Later years and merger ===
In 1917, the previously separate companies publishing the Gazette Times and Chronicle Telegraph were brought under a holding company, the Newspaper Printing Company. George T. Oliver remained the principal figure in the organization until his death in 1919, after which his sons George S. and Augustus K. Oliver assumed control. Under their management, daily circulation again exceeded 100,000; Andrews reported that by the time the newspapers were sold in 1927, the Sunday edition was regularly selling about 150,000 copies.

In its final years, the morning paper also appeared under the title Pittsburgh Gazette Times.

The Pittsburgh newspaper market underwent further consolidation during the 1920s. In 1927, Hearst negotiated the purchase of the Oliver family's Gazette Times, Chronicle Telegraph, and newspaper plant, while Paul Block arranged to purchase the rival Pittsburgh Post and its evening sister, the Pittsburgh Sun. Hearst and Block then exchanged properties: Hearst received the Sun and combined it with the Chronicle Telegraph as the Pittsburgh Sun-Telegraph, while Block received the Gazette Times and merged it with the Post as the Pittsburgh Post-Gazette.

The Gazette Times issued its final number on July 31, 1927, according to library catalog records. The first Pittsburgh Post-Gazette was published on August 2. Block announced that the consolidation left Pittsburgh with a single weekday morning newspaper.
