= Robert Giles =

American newspaper editor and publisher (1933–2023)

Robert Hartmann Giles (June 6, 1933 – August 7, 2023) was an American newspaper editor and publisher who was the curator of the Nieman Foundation for Journalism at Harvard University.

== Early life and education ==
Giles graduated from DePauw University in 1955 and received his master's degree in 1956 from the Columbia University Graduate School of Journalism.

== Career ==
Giles was a Nieman Fellow in 1966 and a Gannett Professional-in-Residence at the William Allen White School of Journalism at the University of Kansas. During his newspaper career, he served as managing editor of The Akron Beacon Journal, executive editor of The Rochester Democrat & Chronicle, and editor and publisher of The Detroit News.

Under Giles' editorship, The Akron Beacon Journal received the Pulitzer Prize in 1971 for coverage of the Kent State shootings, and The Detroit News won in 1994 for the newspaper's disclosures of a scandal in the Michigan House Fiscal Agency. He was the author of Newsroom Management: A Guide to Theory and Practice" and "When Truth Mattered: The Kent State Shootings 50 Years Later. On July 13, 1995, labor practice changes by Giles led to about 2,500 employees of The Detroit News and Detroit Free Press going on strike in the Detroit newspaper strike of 1995–97. The papers lost approximately US$100,000,000 (equivalent to $152,446,103 in 2017) in the first six months of the strike.

Giles worked at The Freedom Forum prior to taking the curatorship at Nieman in 2000. He retired as curator in 2011.

== Death ==
Robert Giles died from complications of metastatic melanoma at a hospice facility in Traverse City, Michigan, on August 7, 2023. He was 90.
