= Clarke Thomas =

American journalist

Clarke M. Thomas (1926-2009) was an American journalist.

He was born in Kansas, raised by Christian missionary parents in Sierra Leone, and graduated with a degree in journalism from University of Kansas. After a tour of duty in the US Army, he was as a reporter with The Hutchinson News, the Lincoln Journal, the Wichita Eagle, and the Daily Oklahoman. He began a long and influential career at Pittsburgh Post-Gazette in 1971. He served a term as president of the National Conference of Editorial Writers.

== Books ==
- They Came to Pittsburgh, (Pittsburgh: Pittsburgh Post-Gazette, 1983).
- Witness to the Fifties: The Pittsburgh Photographic Library, 1950-1953, with Constance B. Schulz and Steven W. Plattner (Pittsburgh: University of Pittsburgh Press, 1999).
- Front-Page Pittsburgh: Two Hundred Years of the Post-Gazette, (Pittsburgh: University of Pittsburgh Press, 2005).
- A Patrician of Ideas: A Biography of A.W. Schmidt, (Pittsburgh: Pittsburgh History & Landmarks Foundation, 2006).
- This Far by Faith: The Community of Reconciliation Church History, (Pittsburgh: Community of Reconciliation, 2008).

== Sources ==
Contemporary Authors Online. The Gale Group, 2008.
