= Madison Press Connection =

Defunct Wisconsin daily newspaper for worker strikes

Madison Press Connection was a newspaper formed in Madison, Wisconsin in October 1977 by striking union employees from the two dominant daily newspapers, the Wisconsin State Journal and The Capital Times. The Press Connection began as a weekly but became a daily early in 1978 in an effort to intensify pressure on management of Madison Newspapers, Inc. to make concessions to the union. The Press Connection was published through early January 1980 and is available on microfilm, along with 9 boxes of archival business records and photographs, from The State Historical Society of Wisconsin. The archival records document "the survival struggles of this unusual strike newspaper and the operation of this worker-managed cooperative".

The Press Connection provided serious competition by scooping the larger papers on numerous stories, and by publishing controversial articles and cartoons. It evolved from a strike paper to one of the few cooperatively organized and owned daily newspapers ever to exist in the United States. The Press Connection's cooperative structure was credited as the reason for numerous journalistic risks that corporate media avoided, including the publication in 1979 of an article purporting to provide the "secrets" of building an H-bomb.

Ron McCrea served as editor of the Press Connection. The staff was initially made up entirely of striking employees of MNI, with the exception of cartoonist Pete Wagner, whose controversial work spurred his firing within two weeks of being hired, but who was rehired when the staff voted to keep him in spite of numerous cancellations by irate readers. Wagner left the paper after ten months and was later replaced by Mike Konopacki, who specialized in labor-related cartoons.

== See also ==
- Detroit Sunday Journal
