= The Elizabethtown Advocate =

Weekly newspaper in Pennsylvania, US

- Type: Weekly newspaper
- Owner: LNP Media Group
- Founded: 2010
- Ceased publication: December 30, 2021
- Headquarters: Elizabethtown, PA, United States
- Circulation: 5,982 as of 2017
- Website: etownpa.com

The Elizabethtown Advocate was a weekly newspaper serving Elizabethtown, Pennsylvania, from 2010 to 2021. The paper grew from having approximately 600 copies being produced weekly in 2011 to a paid circulation of 5,982 as of 2017 before ceasing publication at the end of 2021.

The Advocate was founded in 2010 by veteran Associated Press journalist Dan Robrish. Robrish worked for the AP for 11 1/2 years.

Before working for the Associated Press, Robrish was employed by the Pottstown Mercury, the Journal of New Ulm in Minnesota and the Ely Daily Times in Nevada.

The Advocate was a "one-man" newspaper for 7 years with Robrish as the sole reporter, editor, and publisher.

The Advocate superseded the Elizabethtown Chronicle which folded after 140 years in 2009. The Chronicle folded when its parent company, the Journal-Register, filed for bankruptcy.

The Advocate was acquired by the LNP Media Group, a subsidiary of the Steinman Communications, in 2017. LNP also publishes Lancaster County Weeklies, including The Ephrata Review and The Lititz Record.
