= LNP (newspaper) =

Daily newspaper in Lancaster, Pennsylvania, United States

- Always Lancaster
- Type: Daily newspaper
- Format: Broadsheet
- Owner: LNP Media Group
- Founded: 1794 (original); October 16, 2014 (as LNP)
- Language: English
- Headquarters: 101 North Queen Street
- City: Lancaster, Pennsylvania
- Country: United States
- Circulation: 38,300 Daily; 47,000 Sunday (as of 2023)
- Website: lancasteronline.com

LNP is a daily newspaper headquartered in Lancaster, Pennsylvania. The newspaper is published by the LNP Media Group, a division of the family-owned Steinman Enterprises. First published under its present name on October 14, 2014, LNP traces its roots to one of the oldest newspapers in the U.S., The Lancaster Journal, which dates back to 1794. The newspaper's broadsheet print edition is published in the morning, seven days per week. The paper's online counterpart is LancasterOnline.com. The online edition of the newspaper is currently blocked to European visitors as a response by LancasterOnline.com to the 2018 EEA data privacy regulations popularly known as GDPR.

LNP is the third-largest daily circulation print newspaper in the state of Pennsylvania, as of December 2016.

In June 2023, the Steinman family donated the publication to WITF, a Harrisburg public broadcaster.

== History ==
In 2009, Lancaster's two daily newspapers, the morning Intelligencer Journal and the evening Lancaster New Era, which were both published by Lancaster Newspapers (present-day LNP Media Group) and headquartered in the same building, were merged to form the Intelligencer Journal-Lancaster New Era. Though the Sunday sister paper, the Sunday News, joined the combined newsroom in 2012, it continued to be published under the same masthead until the rebranding in October 2014.

In 2014, the Intelligencer Journal-Lancaster New Era, as well as the Sunday News, were combined, rebranded, and renamed LNP. The first issue of the newly renamed LNP was published on October 16, 2014. Under its current masthead, LNP adopted the tagline Always Lancaster. The rebranding was "aimed at representing and embracing the history of Lancaster County," the brand and the audience, according to the publisher. The slogan also alludes to the abbreviation that was used to refer to "Lancaster Newspapers" for much of the latter part of the 20th century. The paper was redesigned to include a more visually-appealing format and more user-friendly sections and pages.

LNP's current newsroom includes journalists from the former Intelligencer Journal, Lancaster New Era and Sunday News.

In May 2015, LNP closed its newspaper printing facility in downtown Lancaster, citing the need to improve print quality and upgrade full color options required for every page in the newspaper. LNP newspapers are now printed at a newer facility owned by Advance Central Services Pennsylvania and the PA Media Group in Hampden Township, Pennsylvania, approximately 50 miles northwest of Lancaster. The move allowed LNP to print an additional 60,000 newspapers on weekdays, as well as 80,000 more papers for its Sunday edition.

In April 2023, Steinman Communications informed LNP staff that they would donate LNP Media Group to WITF, effective that June. No changes in staffing or printing frequency are expected for at least five years.

Steinman Communications and WITF will partner to create the Steinman Institute for Civic Engagement. Steinman Communications will retain Lancaster Farming, a weekly farm newspaper, and Susquehanna Printing, which will continue to print LNP. Its affiliate, Steinman Real Estate Group, will maintain its real estate holdings.

In October 2024, WITF and LNP eliminated 24 positions, which amounted to 10% of total staff. In February 2025, staff voted 39–10 in favor of unionizing with the NewsGuild Philadelphia.

== Endorsements ==
On October 18, 2016, LNP's editorial board endorsed Hillary Clinton for president in the 2016 presidential election.

The outlet would become a public benefit corporation if its donation to WITF proceeds. As a nonprofit, it would be unable to endorse candidates for public office.

== Political Positions ==
The LNP Editorial Board does not support the legalization of adult-use cannabis in Pennsylvania. The board had this to say in an Oct 2019 opinion piece: "We realize our stance will displease some LNP readers. Sixty-seven percent of the 2,028 Lancaster County residents who called, emailed or mailed comments to Lt. Gov. Fetterman during his 67-county marijuana listening tour were in favor of legalization. But the LNP Editorial Board aims to be a voice, not an echo. And we’re using our voice to say that legalization is a lousy idea."
