= Cy Hungerford =

American editorial cartoonist

Cyrus Cotton Hungerford (June 27, 1888 – May 25, 1983) was an American editorial cartoonist who produced daily cartoons for the Pittsburgh Post-Gazette from 1927 until his retirement in 1977. His many awards included a Golden Quill Award (1966), a Pennsylvania Award of Excellence (1970) and the honorary degree of Doctor of Arts from Washington and Jefferson College.

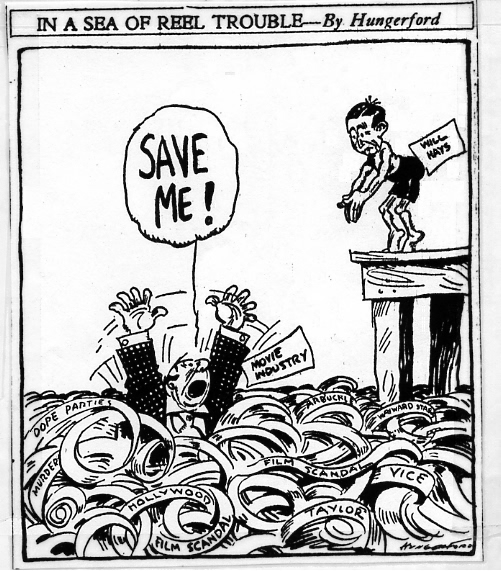
1922 Editorial cartoon by Cy Hungerford

Hungerford was born in Manilla, Indiana, in 1889 but lived as a child in Parkersburg, West Virginia. As a boy, he practised drawing by copying cartoons from the newspapers, and his first published cartoon was in the Parkersburg Sentinel in 1903. He later worked for the Wheeling Register before becoming editorial cartoonist for the Pittsburgh Sun for fifteen years from 1912. He joined the Pittsburgh Post-Gazette in 1927.

Of all the cartoon versions of 'Pa Pitt', a character used to personify the city of Pittsburgh since the 1890s, Cy Hungerford's rendition has been one of the most familiar to Pittsburghers.

Although he worked principally as an editorial cartoonist, Cy Hungerford also produced Snoodles, a syndicated daily comic strip, for several years beginning in 1913. During World War II he produced defense posters.

Cy Hungerford died on May 25, 1983, in the Pittsburgh suburb of Wexford, Pennsylvania, at the age of 93. His first wife, Alice Meade, whom he married in 1942, died in 1964, and he died four days after the death of his second wife Dorothy Goetz.
