= Pittsburgh Leader =

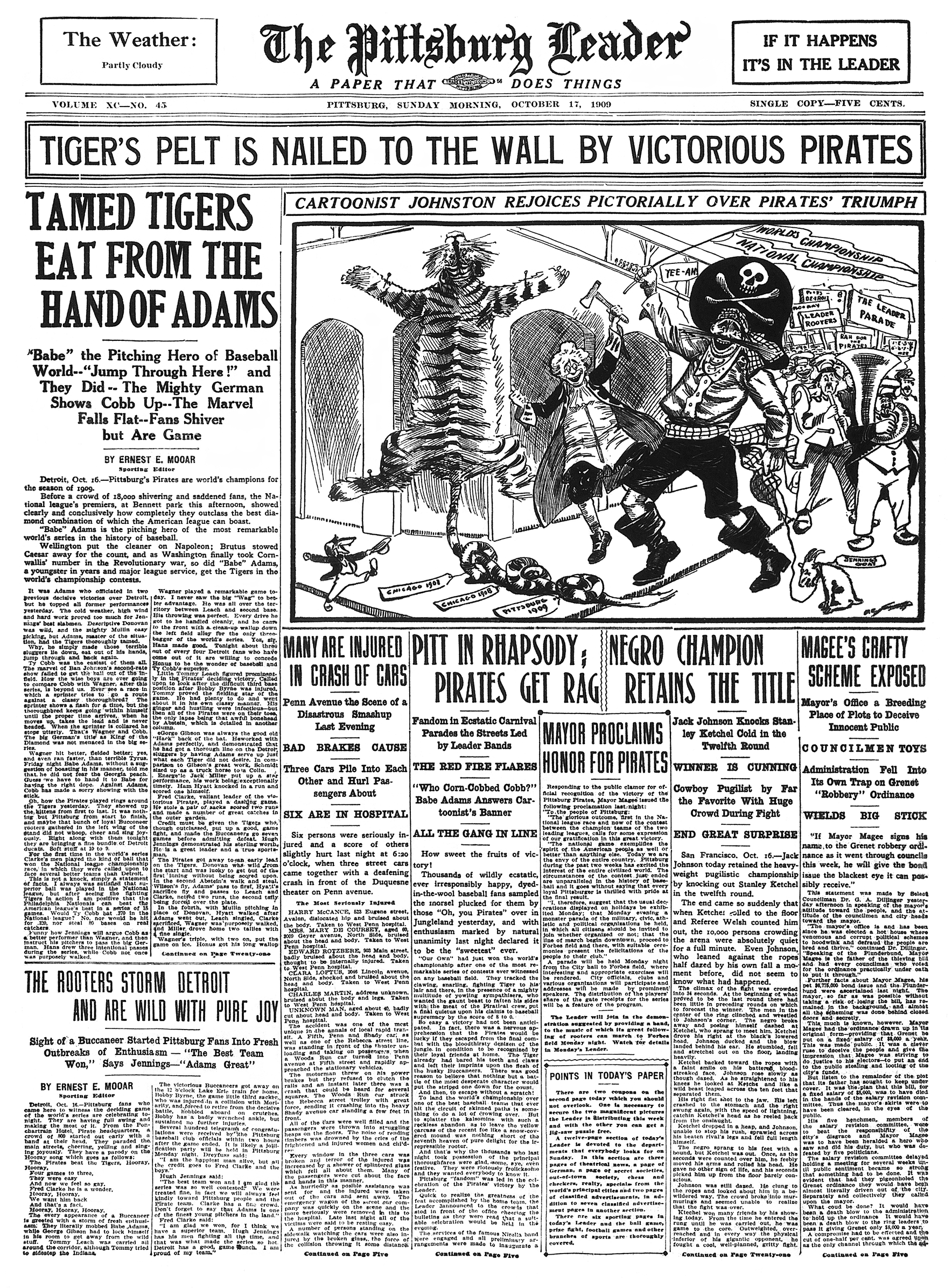
- Front page, 17 October 1909
- Founder: John W. Pittock
- Founded: 11 December 1864 (Sunday), 18 October 1870 (daily)
- Ceased publication: 14 February 1923
- Political alignment: Independent
- Language: English
- City: Pittsburgh, Pennsylvania
- Country: United States

The Pittsburgh Leader was a newspaper published from 1864 to 1923 in Pittsburgh, Pennsylvania.

== History ==
John W. Pittock, a 21-year-old former newsboy, first published the Leader as a Sunday weekly on 11 December 1864. A daily edition called the Evening Leader appeared on 18 October 1870 under the leadership of Pittock and partners John I. Nevin, Robert P. Nevin, and Edward H. Nevin. The paper took an independent political line.

Already in 1873, the Leader was listed in Rowell's American Newspaper Directory as having the largest daily circulation in Pittsburgh. It was also at the time the city's only daily with a Sunday edition, aside from the German-language Volksblatt.

Following Pittock's death in 1881, members of the Nevin family owned and operated the paper until selling in 1906 to a team led by Alexander Pollock Moore, who became publisher and editor-in-chief. Ex-political boss William Flinn was suspected of being the real purchaser, bringing into question the paper's claimed nonpartisanism. Muckraker Will Irwin, writing in Collier's magazine, accused Moore of turning the responsible, civic-minded Leader into a scandalmongering "yellow newspaper."

Pittsburgh newspaper consolidation timeline

The Leader and the Pittsburgh Dispatch published their last issues on 14 February 1923, being jointly purchased and absorbed by the other Pittsburgh papers: the Post, Sun, Gazette Times, Chronicle Telegraph, and the Press. At the time, advertisers and publishers had long regarded the Pittsburgh newspaper market as overcrowded. Only four years after the demise of the Leader and Dispatch, mergers further narrowed the field of mainstream Pittsburgh dailies from five to three.

== Notable contributors ==
Early in her career, author Willa Cather worked at the Leader as a telegraph editor and drama critic.

Investigative journalist and media critic George Seldes started out as a cub reporter at the Leader in 1909 at age 18. In a late-life memoir, he alleged that the Leader and other papers had allowed businesses to kill unfavorable stories in exchange for advertising payments.

Actress Lillian Russell, who was married to publisher Moore, had a beauty advice column called "Lillian Russell's Philosophy." Russell's death in June 1922 possibly contributed to Moore's decision to discontinue the paper; Moore said in his farewell column eight months later that "since June of last year I have not had the same incentive to continuous effort that previously inspired me."

Arthur G. Burgoyne or cartoonist Fred Johnston, or both, created the character Father Pitt as a personification of the city of Pittsburgh. The character was adopted by numerous editorial cartoonists in other Pittsburgh papers.

== Spelling of Pittsburgh ==
The Leader spelled its city's name as "Pittsburgh" originally, and "Pittsburg" from 1876 on. It announced the change on New Year's Eve, 1875:

Pittsburghers, in spite of the next to universal practice outside of their own immediate neighborhood, will persist in spelling the name of their city with a final "h." The Leader has thus far acquiesced in the general custom, but the time has come when it must decline to follow up on that line any longer. After next Sunday, therefore, the superfluous letter may not be expected to again appear in our pages.
