= Rob Rogers (cartoonist) =

American cartoonist

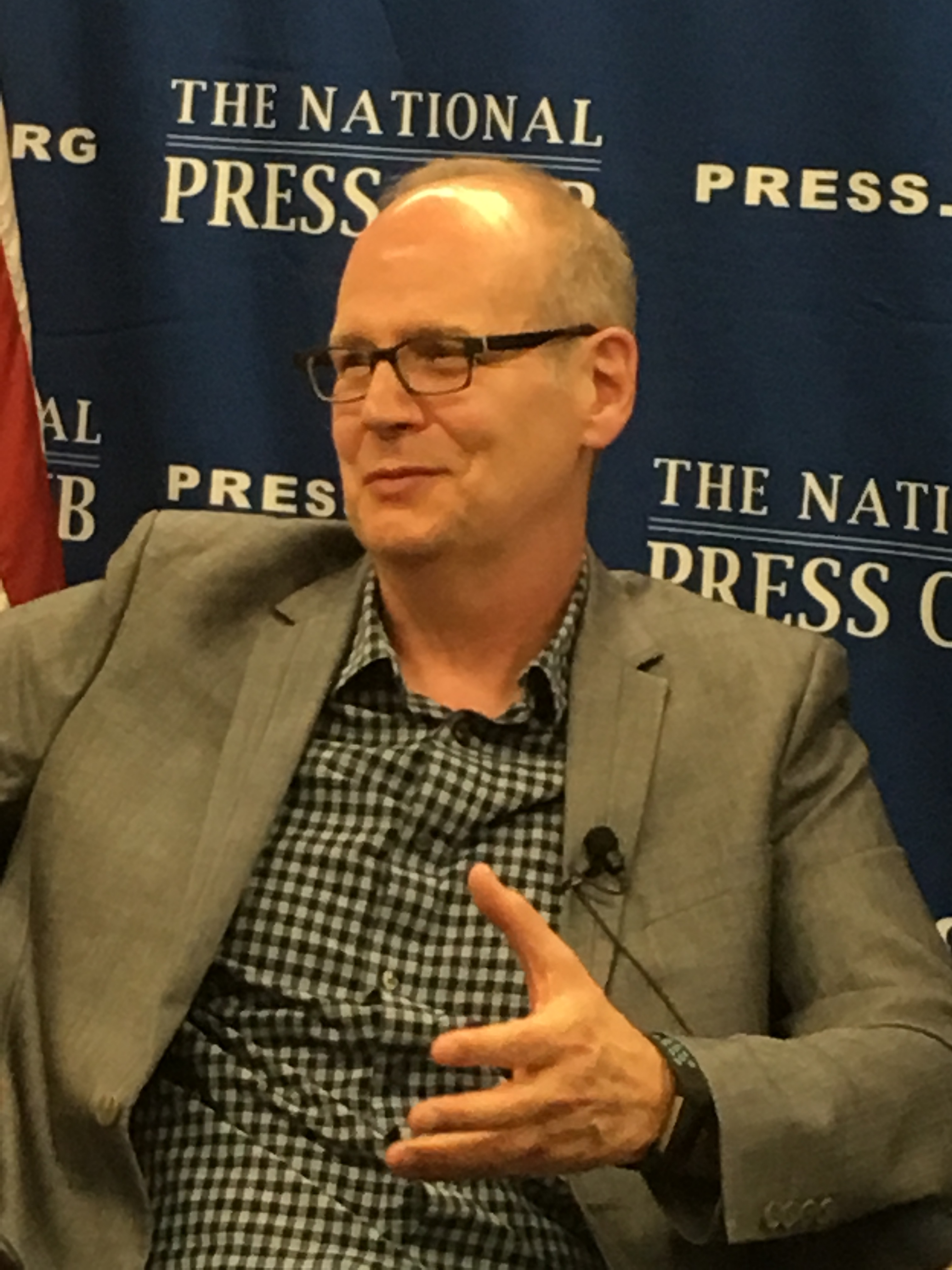
Rob Rogers in 2018

Rob Rogers (born May 23, 1959) is an editorial cartoonist. His cartoons appeared in The Pittsburgh Press from 1984 to 1993, and the Pittsburgh Post-Gazette from 1993 to 2018. In 1999 and 2019, he was a finalist for the Pulitzer Prize for Editorial Cartooning.

He was fired from the Pittsburgh Post-Gazette on June 14, 2018 for his cartoons that were critical of President Donald Trump.

His cartoons are still syndicated by GoComics.

== Works ==
- No Cartoon Left Behind!: The Best of Rob Rogers., Pittsburgh, PA : Carnegie Mellon University Press, 2009. ISBN 9780887485152, OCLC 464597614
- Mayoral Ink: Cartooning Pittsburgh's Mayors. Pittsburgh, PA : The Author, 2015. ISBN 9780692477496, OCLC 1017098254
- Enemy of the People: A Cartoonist's Journey, San Diego, CA : IDW, Idea & Design Works, 2019. ISBN 9781684055944, OCLC 1082447868
