= Martha Rial =

Pulitzer Prize winning Photojournalist

- Born: 1961 (age 64–65); Murrysville, PA
- Occupation: Photojournalist
- Known for: 1998 Pulitzer Prize for Spot News Photography
- Website: martharial.com

Martha Rial (born 1961) is an independent photographer based in Pittsburgh, PA. She is the winner of 1998 Pulitzer Prize for Spot News Photography her photographs of Rwandan and Burundian refugees.

== Life ==
She is a native of the Pittsburgh suburb of Murrysville, Pennsylvania.

She graduated from the Art Institute of Pittsburgh and Ohio University with a BFA in 1998.

She was a staff photographer at the Ft. Pierce Tribune, and the Journal Newspapers in Alexandria, Virginia. In 1994, she became a staff photographer at the Pittsburgh Post-Gazette. Rial also worked as a senior photojournalist at the St Petersburg Times (now the Tampa Bay Times) from 2006 to 2009.

In 2005, she had a gallery show at The Mattress Factory.

== Awards ==
- 1998 Pulitzer Prize for Spot News Photography
- 1998 National Journalism Award winners, Scripps Howard Foundation

== Works ==
- Pittsburgh Post-Gazette pulitzer work on Rwanda.
- "Homework, no home", St. Petersburg Times
- "Off Stage: On Hartwood Grounds", Pittsburgh Cross Currents
- "Martha Rial: Trek of Tears", The 1998 Pulitzer Prize Winners
- "For the birds", Michael Pestel, Pittsburgh 2006
- "Pittsburgh Marchers' Message", Common Dreams
