= LNP Media Group =

Media group in Lancaster, Pennsylvania, United States

- Type: Private
- Genre: Newspapers
- Founded: 1794
- Headquarters: Lancaster, Pennsylvania, U.S.
- Area served: Lancaster County
- Website: LancasterOnline.com

LNP Media Group, formerly Lancaster Newspapers, owns and publishes LNP, a daily newspaper based in Lancaster County, Pennsylvania, and LancasterOnline, its online affiliate with monthly readership of over one million. LNP traces its roots to The Lancaster Journal, first published in 1794.

LNP Media Group publishes three other local newspapers in Lancaster County: The Lititz Record Express, The Ephrata Review and The Elizabethtown Advocate. Additionally, LNP Media Group owns and publishes two specialty publications: La Voz Lancaster (formerly La Voz Hispana), and Fly After 5 (formerly Fly Magazine).

LNP Media Group is owned by Steinman Communications, a corporation controlled by descendants of Andrew Jackson Steinman, who purchased the Intelligencer in 1866. In April 2023, Steinman Communications announced plans to donate most of LNP Media Group's holdings to Harrisburg public broadcaster WITF.

== Specialty publications ==
La Voz Lancaster is a bi-monthly publication covering the Hispanic community in Lancaster County. Fly After 5 is a bi-monthly newspaper covering Lancaster County nightlife and entertainment.

== Steinman Communications ==
LNP Media Group is owned by Steinman Communications, a corporation controlled by descendants of Andrew Jackson Steinman, who purchased the Intelligencer in 1866. The holding company owns Intelligencer Printing, one of the oldest commercial printing houses in the United States; Susquehanna Printing, a contract printer and publisher of weekly newspapers; Delmarva Broadcasting Company; real estate investments in Lancaster City; and energy holdings in southern Virginia.

In April 2023, Steinman Communications announced plans to donate most of LNP Media Group's holdings to Harrisburg public broadcaster WITF. Two years later, Pennon, the parent organization WITF formed after the acquisition, announced plans to donate LNP Media Group to Always Lancaster, a new nonprofit formed by former NPR journalist David Greene. Pennon leadership said running the newspaper came with unanticipated financial challenges. The transfer is pending approval by Pennsylvania's attorney general.

== Intelligencer Journal ==
First printed in 1794 as the Lancaster Journal, the Intelligencer Journal was the largest circulation newspaper in Lancaster, Pennsylvania, and the oldest continuously published newspaper in the United States of America that had not changed its name.

== Lancaster New Era ==
The Lancaster New Era was founded in 1877 with the goal of taking the state Republican machine to task. In 1920, New Era merged with another Republican newspaper, The Examiner. Paul Block Sr. bought the New Era-Examiner three years later and positioned it to compete with the morning Intelligencer and afternoon New Journal, both published by the Steinmans. When the venture failed in 1928, Block sold the paper, now named New Era, to the Steinmans, who merged the Intell and Journal into the morning Intelligencer Journal and published New Era as an afternoon newspaper on every day of the week except Sunday. The Saturday edition was eliminated in 2007 and associated content moved to the Saturday-morning edition of Intell.

By 2009, New Era had the largest circulation of any Pennsylvania newspaper in the afternoon newspaper market. It won the Pennsylvania NewsMedia Association Sweepstakes Award four years in a row. Its reporting on the West Nickel Mines School shooting in eastern Lancaster County won numerous state and national awards, among them the Pulliam National Journalism Writing Award and the Taylor Award for Fairness from the Nieman Foundation for Journalism.

On 26 June 2009, Lancaster Newspapers published the final afternoon edition of New Era, citing increasing costs and decreasing readership, and merged it with the Intelligencer Journal. Columns, comics and other syndicated content previously reserved for the afternoon edition now appear in the Journal.

== The Sunday News ==
Established in 1923 as the first local Sunday newspaper in Lancaster County, The Sunday News was renamed Sunday LNP in October 2014.

== La Voz Lancaster ==
La Voz Lancaster (formerly La Voz Hispana) is a bi-monthly news source for the Hispanic population of Lancaster County.

== The Caucus ==
The Caucus is a weekly watchdog investigative paper aimed at Pennsylvania politics.

== Editorial stance ==
The Intell traditionally retained a center-left editorial stance, while the New Era was reliably conservative. For five years after the papers merged, the combined publication ran two distinct editorial pages. In 2014, however, Lancaster Newspapers adopted an independent stance, publishing a single editorial page thereafter.

== LNP ==
Under its current masthead, LNP was first published in October 2014 with the tagline "Always Lancaster." As of 2016, the newsroom was quite likely combining journalists from The Intelligencer Journal, New Era and Sunday News.

== LancasterOnline ==
LancasterOnline is a subscription service that provides access to all features in the daily newspaper and a searchable digital archive of all content published in the newspaper's history.
