= WITF-FM =

- Harrisburg, Pennsylvania; United States
- Broadcast area: South Central Pennsylvania
- Frequency: 89.5 MHz
- Branding: WITF

Programming
- Format: Public radio and talk
- Affiliations: NPR; PRX

Ownership
- Owner: WITF, Inc.
- Sister stations: WITF-TV

History
- First air date: April 1, 1971
- Call sign meaning: "Where It's Top Flight"

Technical information
- Licensing authority: FCC
- Facility ID: 73084
- Class: B
- ERP: 5,900 watts
- HAAT: 415 meters (1,362 ft)
- Transmitter coordinates: 40°20′44.3″N 76°52′5.9″W
- Translator: See § Simulcast and translator
- Repeater: See § Simulcast and translator

Links
- Public license information: Public file; LMS
- Webcast: Listen live
- Website: www.witf.org

WITF-FM (89.5 FM) is a non-commercial radio station licensed to Harrisburg, Pennsylvania, United States. The station is owned by WITF, Inc., and broadcasts NPR talk and news programming. It is co-owned with the area's Public Broadcasting Service (PBS) member station, WITF-TV (channel 33). Both stations are based at the WITF Public Media Center on Lindle Road in Swatara Township (with a Harrisburg mailing address), and broadcast from a shared tower located on Blue Mountain in Susquehanna Township.

Like most NPR member stations, WITF-FM broadcasts fundraising appeals, seeking contributions from its listeners to support the station.

== History ==
On April 1, 1971, WITF-FM signed on the air, becoming the first station in Central Pennsylvania to broadcast a full-time classical music radio format. It was originally licensed to Hershey (the license moved to Harrisburg in 1982). WITF-FM was founded as the sister station to WITF-TV, which signed on seven years earlier.

At first, the stations broadcast from "temporary" studios at the former Hershey Middle School, moving to Locust Lane in Harrisburg in 1982. On July 22, 2005, WITF-FM-TV began construction on their current 75,000 square foot facility in Swatara Township. Staff began moving into the facility on November 27, 2006.

After airing a mix of classical music and NPR programming for much of its history, the station dropped all classical music programming on June 25, 2012. WITF-FM began a 24-hour schedule of news and information consisting of syndicated programs from NPR and other providers, along with local news and cultural arts reporting by the WITF staff. WITF has its own Multimedia News Department. It provides local and regional news coverage for both radio and TV.

In 2012, StateImpact Pennsylvania won one of three 2013 Alfred I. duPont–Columbia University Awards for its outstanding reporting on energy issues for focusing on the fiscal, environmental and social issues of gas drilling on Pennsylvania's economy. WITF reporter Scott Detrow contributed to the report.

In 2016, WITF's reporting was honored with six regional Edward R. Murrow Awards from the Radio Television Digital News Association for excellence in broadcast and online journalism.

Following the January 6 United States Capitol attack in 2021, WITF's news department began adding language to political news reports to point out that state legislators or members of Congress mentioned in the story advocated against certifying the Pennsylvania 2020 presidential election results. The Washington Post media columnist Margaret Sullivan highlighted this move in a May 2021 column.

== Simulcast and translator ==
Due to the crowded state of the lower end of the FM dial in the Northeast, WITF-FM broadcasts at 5,900 watts, which is fairly modest for a full NPR member on the FM band. As a result, even with its transmitter located atop Blue Mountain, it only provides a grade B signal to the largest city in its service area, Lancaster. To provide a stronger signal to listeners in Lancaster, WITF-FM programming is simulcast on the following translator:

Broadcast translator for WITF-FM
Call sign	Frequency	City of license	FID	ERP (W)	HAAT	Class	Transmitter coordinates	FCC info
W260CC	99.9 FM	Lancaster, Pennsylvania	73082	38	60.1 m (197 ft)	D	40°2′17.4″N 76°18′21.9″W	LMS

On January 9, 2009, WITF-FM also began simulcasting its programming on WYPM:

Call sign	Frequency	City of license	FID	ERP (W)	HAAT	Class	Transmitter coordinates
WYPM	93.3 FM	Chambersburg, Pennsylvania	49384	350	412 m (1,352 ft)	A	40°2′54.3″N 77°45′0.9″W
