= Detroit newspaper strike of 1995–1997 =

Michigan labor action

- Date: July 13, 1995 to February 14, 1997
- Caused by: Labour movement
- Result: Strike ended; union lost its unfair labor practices case on appeal

Parties
Six labor unions representing employees of the Detroit Free Press and The Detroit News	Detroit Free Press and The Detroit News

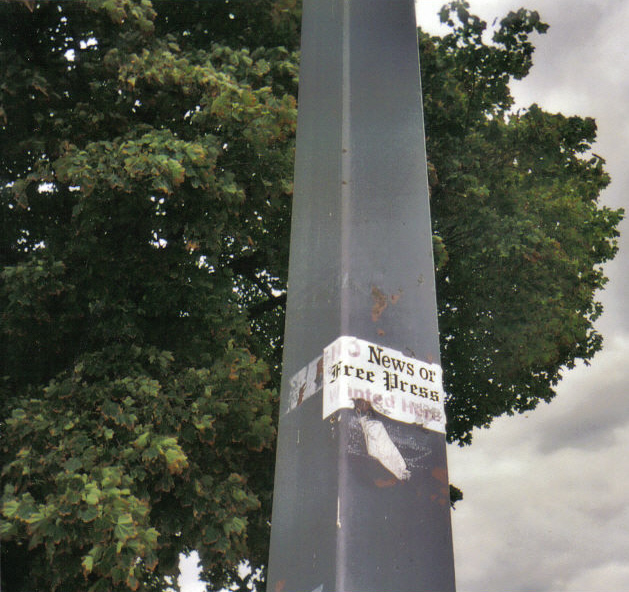
Bumper sticker showing support for the strike and boycott which reads "No News or Free Press Wanted Here". Photo taken in 2005.

The Detroit Newspaper Strike was a major labor dispute in the United States which began in Detroit, Michigan, lasted from 1995 until 1997, and involved several actions including a local boycott, a corporate campaign, violence, and legal charges of unfair labor practices. The primary action involved around 2,500 members of six labor unions who went on strike beginning on July 13, 1995. The unions ended their strike on February 14, 1997, and it was resolved in court three years later, with the journalists' union losing its unfair labor practices case on appeal in 2000.

== Background ==
Tension between the unions and management of Detroit's two primary news publications, Knight-Ridder (the now-defunct former owner of the Detroit Free Press) and Gannett (then the owner of The Detroit News), had been building for several years. Management attempted to force out the unions by switching from employee distribution to independent contractors. The unions claimed management was engaging in unfair labor practices. Chris Rhomberg, a sociology professor at Fordham University, concludes in his 2012 book The Broken Table: The Detroit Newspaper Strike and the State of American Labor that management had deliberately provoked the strike and had been preparing for it for several years. A 1997 article in Revolutionary Worker claimed that the newspaper owners had been planning as early as 1989 to significantly change the existing labor agreements with the unions. They cite, as one example of those efforts, the 1989 merger of the two companies via joint operating agreement, then known as the Detroit Newspaper Agency, which combined the non-editorial operations of the newspapers. The agreement "immediately produced the firing of 1,000 workers–out of a combined workforce of about 3,500." The article also notes that six months before the strike, the newspaper owners hired 1,200 "jack-booted security guards" mostly from Vance International Security, a known union busting outfit.

== The strike ==
On July 13, 1995, about 2,500 members of six different unions went on strike after management indicated it would not discuss recent labor practice changes by Detroit News publisher, Robert Giles. The unions included The Newspaper Guild and the Teamsters, along with the pressmen, printers and Teamsters working for the Detroit Newspapers distribution arm. The papers lost approximately US$100,000,000 (equivalent to $200,559,701 in 2025) in the first six months of the strike.

The newspapers continued to publish during the strike, and aired commercials depicting the "People Behind the Paper". The strikers began publishing a competing weekly newspaper, the Detroit Sunday Journal. By October, about 40% of the editorial staffers had crossed the picket line, and many trickled back over the next months, including Mitch Albom - who wrote a column urging an end to the strike, while others stayed during the duration of the strike. The newspapers hired replacement workers, spent approximately US$40,000,000 (equivalent to $80,223,881 in 2025) on private security, and provided the police department in Sterling Heights, Michigan - where a production plant was located - with US$1,000,000 (equivalent to $2,005,597 in 2025).

During the first two weeks of September 1995, beginning on Labor Day weekend, several thousand strikers and supporters rallied at the Sterling Heights printing plant, intent on preventing trucks from leaving the plant with the Sunday editions. Although they were confronted by hundereds of police officers in full riot gear, they were initially successful. However on Monday, September 4, a five-hour stand off between the strikers and the police occurred, during which the striking workers were beaten with batons and pepper-sprayed. Police eventually deployed tear gas to disperse the crowd; at least one demonstrator was hospitalized due to the fumes. Of the 23 arrests the police made that night, more than half were not newspaper strikers. 15 people were charged with unlawful assembly, five inciting a riot, and the rest with disorderly conduct and resisting or interfering with an arrest, including a photographer for the Associated Press who was dragged away while taking pictures of police beating a demonstrator.

October saw more violence between the strikers, the police, and the security guards. On October 1, 1995, a group of Vance security guards charged into the crowd of strikers, injuring at least four people, one of whom was 28 year old Vito Sciuto. Sciuto had stopped to help a fallen demonstrator when a security guard struck him on the head with a heavy wooden stick. He suffered a fractured skull, brain damage resulting in seizures, and required reconstructive surgery of his face and eye. No one was arrested or charged for the assault.

Two nights later, on October 3, another striking worker, 38 year old James Mikonczyk, was picketing near the street when a convoy of trucks left through the gate of the newspaper facility. The driver of one of the trucks, 35 year old suspended Detroit police officer Brian Carter, "turned onto the road without stopping and struck Mikonczyk, rolling over him with both the front and back wheels. Neither Carter nor the remaining drivers in the convoy stopped to help Mikonczyk, who lay in the street for forty-five minutes before an ambulance arrived." Mikonczyk was hospitalized for six weeks with a broken hip, leg, and arm. Carter was briefly arrested, but no charges were brought against him and no disciplinary action was taken by the newspaper. The Detroit News Agency released a statement which called the injury "unfortunate" but ultimately blamed the strikers for the events, reading "We have said over and over again since the strike began that the practices used by the picketers are, in many cases, illegal and likely to have disastrous results."

That month the unions filed a federal civil rights lawsuit in U.S. District Court against the Detroit News Agency, its private security firms, and the city of Sterling Heights, alleging that the defendants conspired to deprive union members of their rights during the strike, and seeking at least $15 million in damages and injunctive relief to prevent further harassment of strikers. In November, the company filed a counterclaim alleging conspiracy by the unions under the federal Racketeer Influenced and Corrupt Organizations (RICO) Act. According to Rhomberg, "the lawsuits would remain outstanding for more than five years, until the strike itself was settled in December 2000."

Striking workers traveled around the United States to draw attention to the conflict and pressure corporate boards of directors of advertisers in the two newspapers. In Winter 1996, twenty-seven strikers were arrested for blocking the Gannett Company's printing facility for the USA Today regional edition in Port Huron, Michigan. The company switched printing of that edition to a more secure facility in Toledo, Ohio. In September 1996, columnist and strike supporter, Susan Watson, was terminated from the Detroit Free Press for participating in a sitdown strike at the Detroit Free Press Building.

The strike was also costly for the labor unions, such as the Teamsters paying about US$30,000,000 (equivalent to $60,167,910 in 2025) toward legal fees and strike benefits.

== Resolution and aftermath ==
On February 14, 1997, the unions ended made an unconditional offer to return to work, but management indicated they would not fire any of the replacement workers, and would only hire strikers as positions became available. By April 1997, only 200 of the 2,000 striking workers had been rehired.

The National Labor Relations Board ruled in 1997 that the newspapers had engaged in unfair labor practices. In 2000, federal courts reversed the ruling after the newspapers appealed.

The unions remain active at the papers, representing a majority of the employees under their jurisdiction.

Ten years after the strike, the newspapers had still not recovered the lost circulation from the strike.
