= List of channel numbers assigned to FM frequencies in North America =

In the Americas (defined as International Telecommunication Union (ITU) region 2), the FM broadcast band consists of 101 channels, each 200 kHz wide, in the frequency range from 87.8 to 108.0 MHz, with "center frequencies" running from 87.9 MHz to 107.9 MHz. For most purposes an FM station is associated with its center frequency. However, each FM frequency has also been assigned a channel number, which ranges from 200 to 300.

FM channel numbers are most commonly used for internal regulatory purposes. The range originally adopted in 1945 began with channel 201 (88.1 MHz), or a value high enough to avoid confusion with television channel numbers, which over the years have had values ranging from 1 to 83. Having a gap between the highest TV channel number and the lowest FM channel number allowed for expansion, which occurred in 1978 when FM channel 200 (87.9 MHz) was added.

FM channel numbers are commonly used for listing FM Station Allotments, which are the FM station assignments designated for individual communities. In the United States they are also used in the callsigns of low-powered FM translators relaying AM or FM station signals. For example, the "237" in the callsign for translator K237FR in Tumwater, Washington indicates that the station is transmitting on channel 237, which corresponds to 95.3 MHz.

Frequency	Channel
87.9 MHz	200
88.1 MHz	201
88.3 MHz	202
88.5 MHz	203
88.7 MHz	204
88.9 MHz	205
89.1 MHz	206
89.3 MHz	207
89.5 MHz	208
89.7 MHz	209
89.9 MHz	210
90.1 MHz	211
90.3 MHz	212
90.5 MHz	213
90.7 MHz	214
90.9 MHz	215
91.1 MHz	216
91.3 MHz	217
91.5 MHz	218
91.7 MHz	219
91.9 MHz	220
92.1 MHz	221
92.3 MHz	222
92.5 MHz	223
92.7 MHz	224
92.9 MHz	225

Frequency	Channel
93.1 MHz	226
93.3 MHz	227
93.5 MHz	228
93.7 MHz	229
93.9 MHz	230
94.1 MHz	231
94.3 MHz	232
94.5 MHz	233
94.7 MHz	234
94.9 MHz	235
95.1 MHz	236
95.3 MHz	237
95.5 MHz	238
95.7 MHz	239
95.9 MHz	240
96.1 MHz	241
96.3 MHz	242
96.5 MHz	243
96.7 MHz	244
96.9 MHz	245
97.1 MHz	246
97.3 MHz	247
97.5 MHz	248
97.7 MHz	249
97.9 MHz	250

Frequency	Channel
98.1 MHz	251
98.3 MHz	252
98.5 MHz	253
98.7 MHz	254
98.9 MHz	255
99.1 MHz	256
99.3 MHz	257
99.5 MHz	258
99.7 MHz	259
99.9 MHz	260
100.1 MHz	261
100.3 MHz	262
100.5 MHz	263
100.7 MHz	264
100.9 MHz	265
101.1 MHz	266
101.3 MHz	267
101.5 MHz	268
101.7 MHz	269
101.9 MHz	270
102.1 MHz	271
102.3 MHz	272
102.5 MHz	273
102.7 MHz	274
102.9 MHz	275

Frequency	Channel
103.1 MHz	276
103.3 MHz	277
103.5 MHz	278
103.7 MHz	279
103.9 MHz	280
104.1 MHz	281
104.3 MHz	282
104.5 MHz	283
104.7 MHz	284
104.9 MHz	285
105.1 MHz	286
105.3 MHz	287
105.5 MHz	288
105.7 MHz	289
105.9 MHz	290
106.1 MHz	291
106.3 MHz	292
106.5 MHz	293
106.7 MHz	294
106.9 MHz	295
107.1 MHz	296
107.3 MHz	297
107.5 MHz	298
107.7 MHz	299
107.9 MHz	300
