= WITF-TV =

Television station in Harrisburg, Pennsylvania

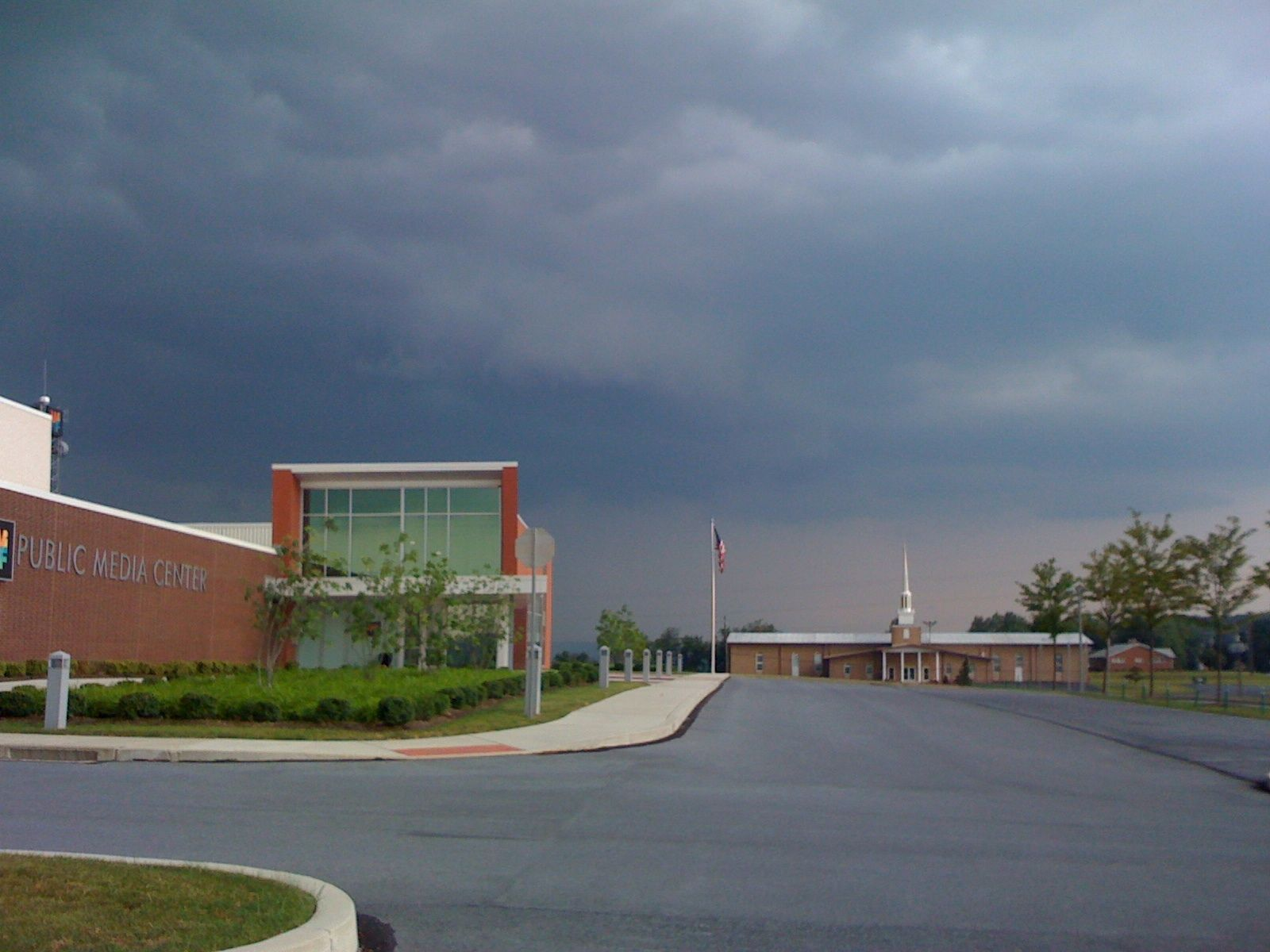
- The WITF Public Media Center (at left), completed in 2006
- Harrisburg–Lancaster–Lebanon–; York, Pennsylvania; United States
- City: Harrisburg, Pennsylvania (Note: Originally licensed to Hershey, Pennsylvania; moved to Harrisburg in 1982.)
- Channels: Digital: 36 (UHF), shared with WPMT; Virtual: 33
- Branding: WITF

Programming
- Affiliations: 33.1: PBS; 33.2: PBS Kids

Ownership
- Owner: WITF, Inc.
- Sister stations: WITF-FM

History
- First air date: November 22, 1964
- Former channel number: Analog: 33 (UHF, 1964–2009)
- Former affiliations: NET (1964–1970)
- Call sign meaning: "It's Top Flight"

Technical information
- Licensing authority: FCC
- Facility ID: 73083
- ERP: 84 kW
- HAAT: 431 m (1,414 ft)
- Transmitter coordinates: 40°20′43.6″N 76°52′7.6″W
- Translator(s): W20EU-D Chambersburg

Links
- Public license information: Public file; LMS
- Website: www.witf.org

WITF-TV (channel 33) is a PBS member television station in Harrisburg, Pennsylvania, United States, serving the Susquehanna Valley region (Harrisburg–Lancaster–Lebanon–York). It is owned by WITF, Inc., alongside the area's NPR member, WITF-FM 89.5. The two stations share studios at the WITF Public Media Center in Swatara Township (with a Harrisburg mailing address); WITF-TV's transmitter is located in Middle Paxton Township, next to the transmitter of CBS affiliate WHP-TV (channel 21). WITF's programming is relayed on low-power digital translator station W20EU-D (channel 20) in Chambersburg.

WITF-TV was established as the first public media outlet in the region in 1964 and was based in Hershey for its first 18 years of existence. It expanded into radio with WITF-FM in 1971 and moved to Harrisburg in 1982. The station's local initiatives include programs on topics of local interest as well as several collaborative ventures in statewide news and educational content.

== History ==
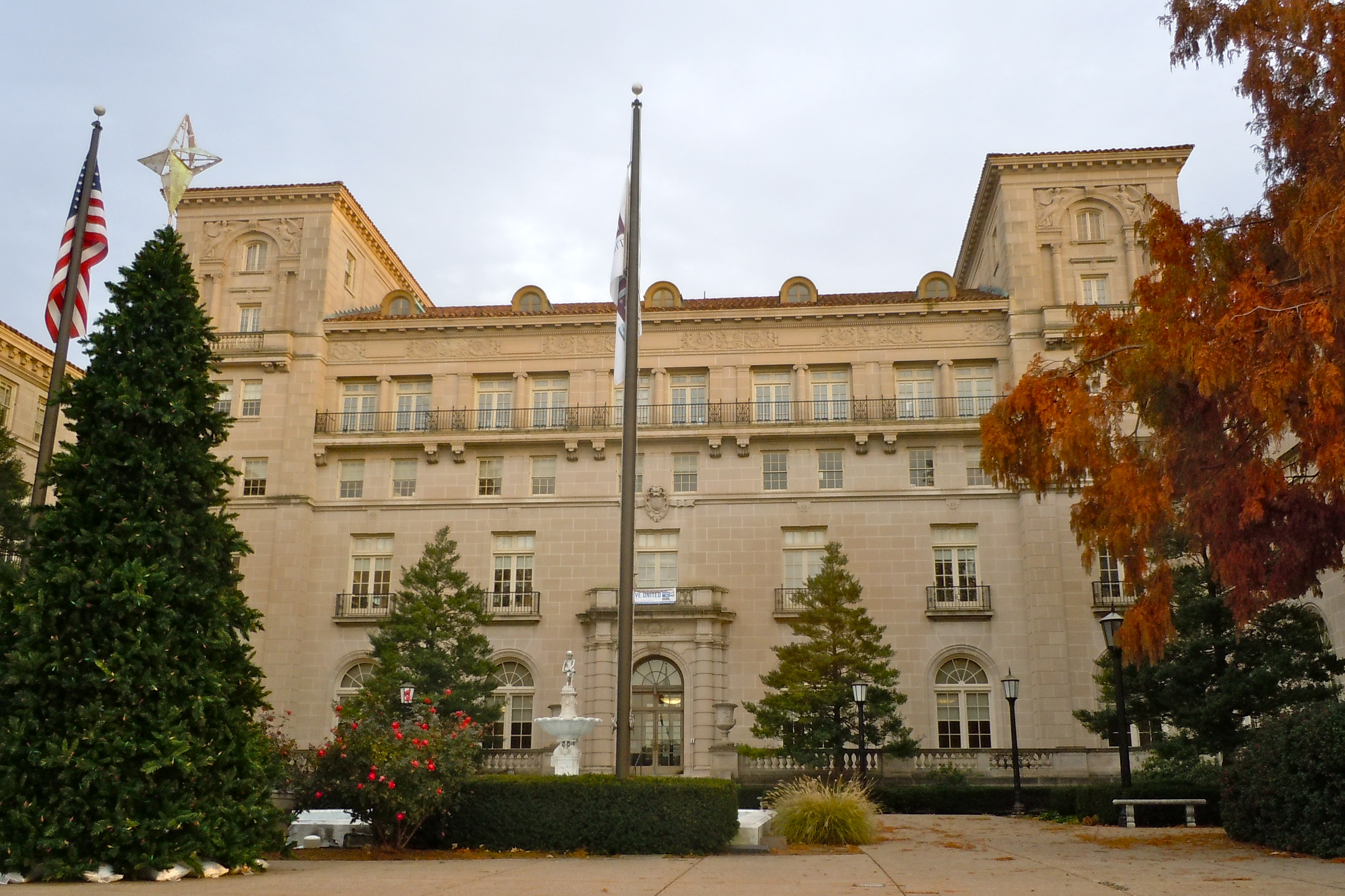
The Hershey Community Center was WITF-TV's first home, used from 1964 to 1981

In 1963, the Pennsylvania Educational Network proposed the introduction of a series of new noncommercial television allotments in the state: channel 3 at Clearfield, channel 36 at Altoona, channel 39 at Allentown (then a commercial channel), channel 65 at Harrisburg, and channel 68 at Scranton. The South Central Educational Broadcasting Council was formed to apply for, build and manage the Harrisburg station. Even before a construction permit application was filed, negotiations began to use the Dauphin County site already home to WHP-TV.

South Central Educational filed its construction permit application in December 1963, specifying a location at Hershey, where studios would be maintained on land donated by the Hershey Estates. The nine counties in the planned service area of the new station were tasked with contributing funds for its startup, while the Department of Health, Education, and Welfare contributed $200,000 in the form of a grant. After the grant, the FCC granted a construction permit on June 30.

The Hudson Broadcasting Corporation, owner of Harrisburg radio station WCMB, held some equipment and a construction permit, unbuilt and unused, for channel 33 in Harrisburg. After reaching a purchase agreement with that firm, South Central Educational filed to move its proposed WITF-TV down from channel 65 to 33. While this would prolong the time needed to put the new station to air by two months, it would reduce costs and improve coverage. Technical difficulties pushed the start back a week, but at a third of authorized power, channel 33 began broadcasting on November 22, 1964. The call letters had been chosen by portraitist Florence Starr Taylor to represent the phrase "it's top flight".

Chambersburg was predicted to receive poor coverage from the Harrisburg transmitter, and a translator for Franklin County went into service in 1965, the predecessor to today's W20EU-D. The station was quickly embraced by the community; April 1971 brought the launch of WITF-FM 89.5, and by 1979, it had the third-highest percentage of supporting members of any public television station in the United States, with viewers contributing 32 percent of its budget. The original transmission equipment was replaced in 1977 along with the commissioning of a new, taller tower, improving coverage and reducing the increasing number of faults attributable to its aging plant.

After leasing space at the Hershey Community Center for 15 years, the Milton Hershey School Trust sold the building in 1979 to Hershey Foods. As a result, WITF radio and television were forced to contemplate a move, examining sites in Derry and South Hanover townships; the stations looked at a new build site which would cost about the same as renovations it had previously planned. In late 1979, the governing board for the stations entered into an agreement under which WITF would have owned and operated a new, 46,000-square-foot (4,300 m^{2}) facility at Harrisburg Area Community College. Robert F. Larson, the president and general manager, noted that the proximity to the Commonwealth capital and educational institutions made a site in Harrisburg desirable. However, the board discovered it would not actually own the land, which was a deal-breaker for WITF and led to the college proposal being dropped. Instead, the council mulled other sites and a proposal to create mini-studios throughout its service area. A nine-acre site was considered and then shelved in early 1981 due to concerns about federal funding cutbacks from the new Reagan administration. Headquarters were initially moved to a Hershey building shared with the public library, but the station ultimately secured facilities on Locust Road in northeast Harrisburg, in the form of the closing Anna L. Carter Elementary School in Susquehanna Township; the closure of the school attracted some opposition to the move from residents. The stations moved in November 1982, with the community of license changing from Hershey to Harrisburg.

Spurred by growth and technological changes, and with 50 more employees than it had in 1982, WITF launched a capital campaign in 2002 to build a new, $22.2 million public media center on a site in Swatara Township, adjacent to Interstate 283. Not only was the Locust Road site hard to find, it lacked an elevator and was not compliant with the Americans with Disabilities Act. Ground was broken in 2005, and staff moved into the new facility in 2006.

In April 2023, WITF and Steinman Communications announced Steinman's plans to donate its LNP Media Group, which includes LNP newspaper based in Lancaster, to WITF, effective that June. The two groups plan to partner on a new nonprofit promoting civic engagement. In October 2024, WITF and LNP eliminated 24 positions, which amounted to 10% of total staff.

== Local programming and initiatives ==
WITF produces several local programs for the south-central Pennsylvania area, including a series on health (Transforming Health) and the annual Central PA Spelling Bee. Drawings for the Pennsylvania Lottery, aired statewide by a network of commercial stations, are also produced at WITF. WITF also produced some television programs that are aired nationally on PBS, such as Computer Chronicles (co-produced with KCSM-TV from 1983 to 1995).

A noted fundraiser held by the station was the art auction Gallery 33, which featured selections of paintings by local artists. Furry artist Brian "Biohazard" Swords became known for a series of submissions featuring sexually suggestive artwork of anthropomorphic rats, eventually prompting WITF to prohibit erotically-themed pieces from being submitted to the auction in 1993. Swords' painting "Stay Up Late" gained renewed interest in March 2020 when—during an episode of his HBO series Last Week Tonight—comedian John Oliver declared an intent to locate and purchase the piece and make a donation to a local food bank as a commentary on the United States' lag in COVID-19 testing, suggesting that it was easier to buy a specific painting from an "unknown" artist than it was to be tested for COVID-19. During the April 12 episode, Oliver revealed that he had obtained the painting, and would later include it in a traveling exhibit intended to help support museums impacted by the pandemic.

In 2018, WITF launched PA Post, a statewide news outlet; the creation of such was suggested as a potential use for funds received in the FCC spectrum auction of 2017. PA Post was folded into Spotlight PA, an investigative portal run by several major Pennsylvania newspapers, in 2020.

Joining two other PBS stations, WITF helped launch the Public Media Educational Platform (which soon changed its name to the Information Equity Initiative) in 2021, with the goal of using datacasting to transmit educational programming to school students without sufficient broadband access. As part of the initiative, WITF has conducted pilots serving K-12 students and prison inmates.

== Technical information ==
=== Subchannels ===
WITF-TV and WPMT broadcast from a transmitter facility in Middle Paxton Township.

Subchannels of WITF-TV and WPMT
License	Subchannel	Res.	Short name	Programming
WITF-TV	33.1	720p	WITF	PBS
WITF-TV	33.2	480i	WITFK	PBS Kids
WPMT	43.1	720p	WPMT-DT	Fox
WPMT	43.2	480i	Antenna	Antenna TV

=== Translator ===
Translators of WITF-TV
City of license	Call sign	Channel	ERP	HAAT	Facility ID	Transmitter coordinates
Chambersburg	W20EU-D	20	15 kW	413 m (1,355 ft)	73081	40°03′0.3″N 77°44′50.9″W

WITF-TV became the first television station in Pennsylvania to broadcast and transmit a digital television signal on UHF channel 36 on August 26, 1998.

WITF-TV ended regular programming on its analog signal, over UHF channel 33, on February 17, 2009, to conclude the federally mandated transition from analog to digital television; the station's digital signal remained on UHF channel 36, using virtual channel 33.

WITF agreed to share its spectrum with Tribune Broadcasting-owned Fox affiliate WPMT (channel 43) following the 2016–2017 FCC incentive auction for $25 million on February 10, 2017. The proceeds were slated to be transferred to WITF's endowment, with interest to be used for Central Pennsylvania's media literacy program; a statewide news organization was cited as another possibility, foreshadowing the creation of PA Post.
