= Paul Block =

Advertising rep and publisher (1875–1941)

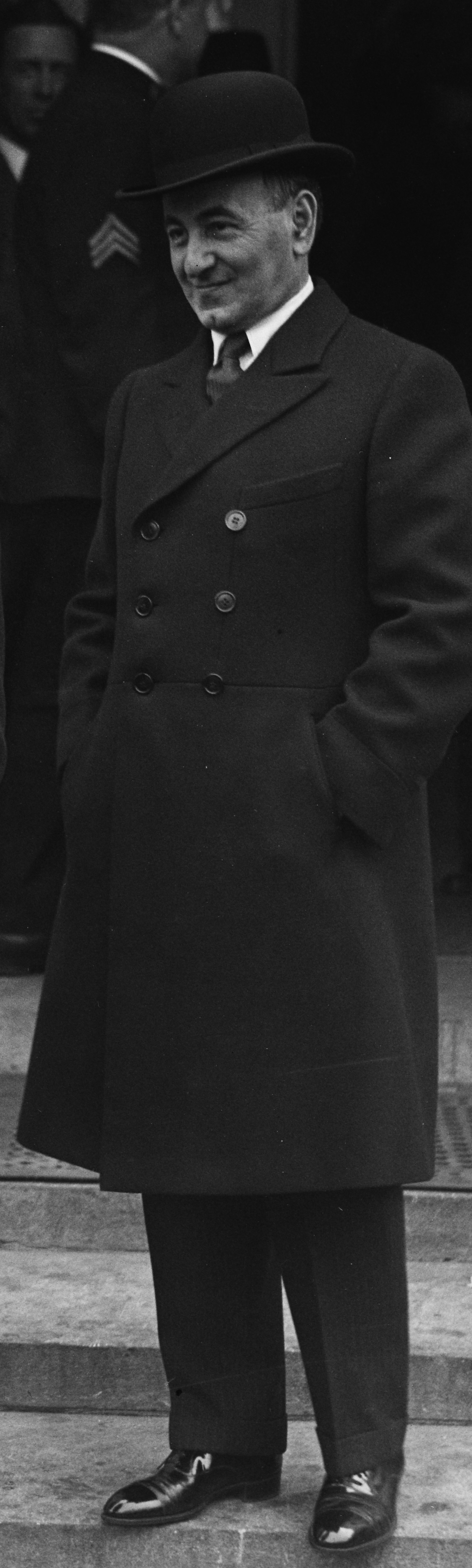
- Block at the White House, 1928
- Born: November 2, 1875; Königsberg, East Prussia
- Died: June 22, 1941 (aged 65); New York City, New York, U.S.
- Known for: Newspaper publisher
- Spouse: Dina Wallach
- Children: William Block; Paul Block Jr.

Paul Block (November 2, 1875 – June 22, 1941) was president of Paul Block and Associates (later Block Communications) and publisher of the Pittsburgh Post-Gazette, The Toledo Blade, and a dozen other newspapers.

== Biography ==
Block was born on November 2, 1875, to a poor Lithuanian Jewish family in Königsberg, East Prussia. In 1885, his parents immigrated to Elmira, New York, where his father worked as a ragpicker. Block attended Elmira public schools and at the age of 10, he worked as a part-time newsboy and office messenger with Harry Brooks, the founder of the Elmira Telegram, where he learned the newspaper business. In 1900, he left the Elmira Telegram and formed his own advertising rep firm which sold national advertising for client newspapers, Block Communications, and is credited with pioneering the concept of national news advertising. He developed a close friendship and business relationship with William Randolph Hearst frequently serving as a frontman for Hearst's newspaper acquisitions (Block's mistress Marion Davies would become Hearst's mistress and Block would later serve as Hearst's executor) as well as purchasing several papers outright beginning with the Newark Star-Eagle and the Detroit Journal.

In 1926, he acquired the Toledo Blade and in 1927, he created the Pittsburgh Post-Gazette. He went on to own 14 papers, including The Milwaukee Sentinel, the Brooklyn Standard-Union, the New York Evening Mail, the Los Angeles Express, the Memphis News-Scimitar, The Toledo Times, the Lancaster New Era, the Duluth Herald, and the Duluth News-Tribune.

Block was a close friend of New York City mayor Jimmy Walker (often letting Walker use his apartment for liaisons with his mistress Ziegfeld Follies dancer Betty Compton) and president Calvin Coolidge. Block also played a key role in advancing the career of future president Franklin D. Roosevelt by supporting his 1928 campaign for governor.

== Philanthropy ==
Block was active in Jewish philanthropy and headed the 1931 campaign of the New York Federation for the Support of Jewish Philanthropic Societies.

== Personal life ==
He was married to Dina Wallach; they had two sons: William Block and Paul Block Jr. Block died of cancer in 1941; funeral services were held at Temple Emanu-El in Manhattan.
