= Detroit Sunday Journal =

Weekly tabloid newspaper in Detroit, Michigan

- Type: Weekly newspaper
- Format: Tabloid
- Founded: November 19, 1995; 31 years ago
- Ceased publication: November 21, 1999; 26 years ago
- City: Detroit, Michigan
- Country: United States
- Website: detroitsundayjournal.com

The Detroit Sunday Journal was a weekly tabloid newspaper published from November 19, 1995, through November 21, 1999, in Detroit, Michigan, in the United States by striking workers from The Detroit News and The Detroit Free Press. It was pro-union, and focused on labor issues as well as local news.

There were just over 200 editions published and circulation for most editions was 40,000–60,000, being made available through the mail and in stores and corner boxes throughout Southeast Michigan. Originally intended to merely shed light on the Detroit Newspaper Strike and other labor issues, it became one of the longest-running temporary newspapers ever.

There were calls for it to become a daily paper in the Detroit area, given its pro-union focus during a time that people considered the leading periodicals, The Detroit News and The Detroit Free Press to be anti-union.

Although the newspaper strike formally ended in February, 1997, the Detroit Sunday Journal continued to be published through November 21, 1999 as union workers were gradually rehired at The Detroit News and The Detroit Free Press.

== See also ==
- List of defunct newspapers of the United States
- Madison Press Connection
