= Strike paper =

Newspaper by strike action participants

A strike paper, strike bulletin or strike newspaper is a news publication started by participants in a strike action.

A 1983 Finnish nursing strike started a strike paper to efficiently communicate with its members.

== In popular culture ==
Papergirl by Melinda McCracken is a novel about a girl who distributes the strikers' newspaper during the 1919 Winnipeg general strike.

== Examples ==
- The Citizens' Voice (1978–present), Wilkes-Barre, Pennsylvania
- Detroit Sunday Journal (1995–1999), Detroit, Michigan
- Madison Press Connection (1977–1980), Madison, Wisconsin
- The Baltimore Banner (1964)
- Sōgi News (1932), Kyushu, Japan
- British Worker (1926)
- Evening Star, Toronto
- Guardian Express (1982-1985), Welland, Ontario
- Seattle Union Record
- Portland Reporter (1960-1964)
- Green Bay News-Chronicle (1972-2005)
