= Daniel O'Neill (editor) =

American journalist and politician

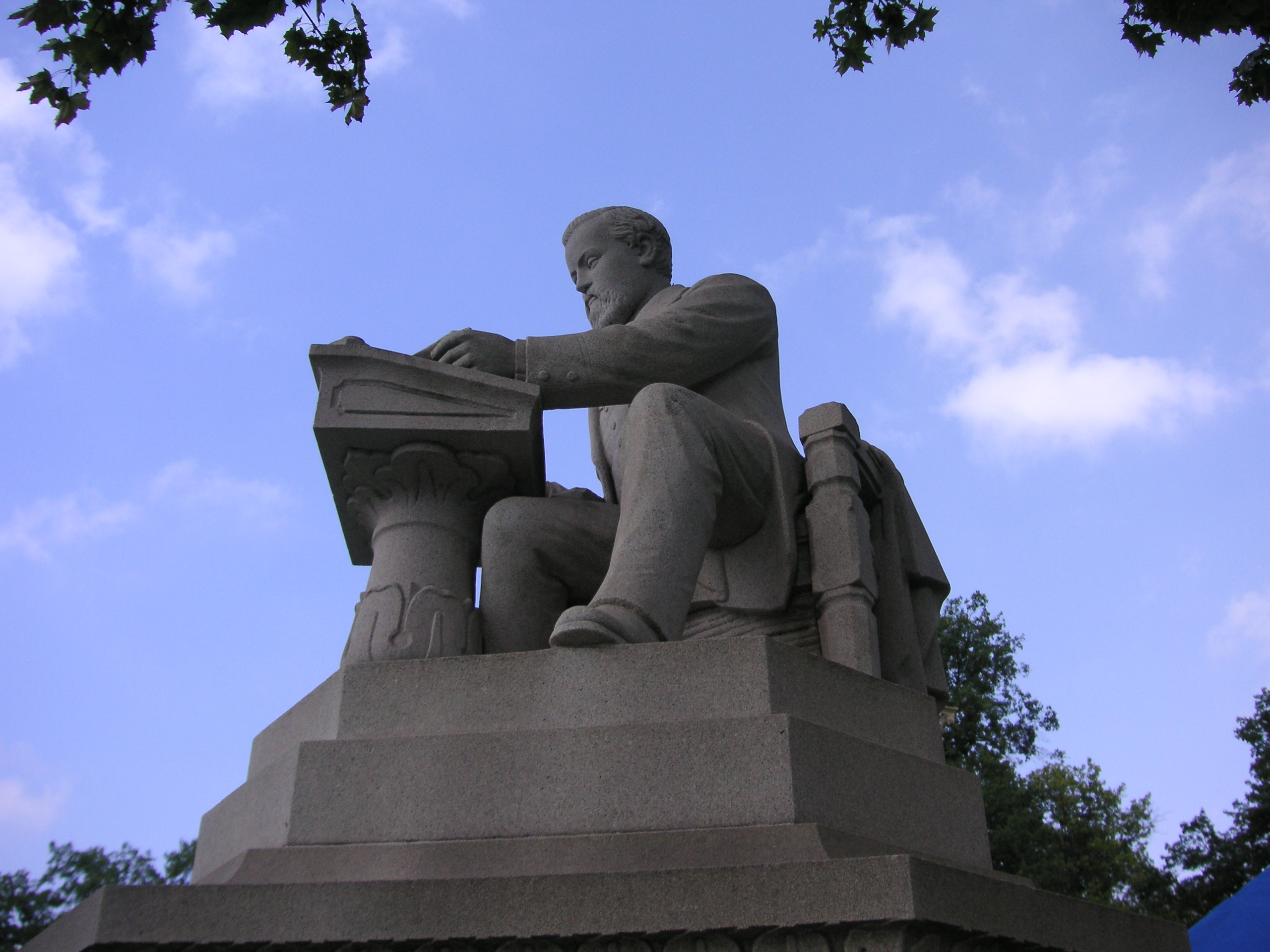
- Memorial to O'Neill at his gravesite in the Allegheny Cemetery
- Born: 1 January 1830; Cloughbawn, County Wexford, Ireland
- Died: 30 January 1877 (aged 47); Pittsburgh, Pennsylvania
- Known for: Editor and owner of the Pittsburgh Dispatch newspaper
- Spouses: Mary O'Neill (m. 1853) Emma Seely ()
- Children: 3

Daniel O'Neill immigrated to the United States from Ireland in 1851, settling in Pittsburgh, Pennsylvania. He became editor and owner of the Pittsburgh Dispatch newspaper along with his brother Eugene M. O'Neill. O'Neill served several terms on the Pittsburgh City Council.

== Early life ==
Daniel, born Daniel O'Connell O'Neill, at Cloughbawn, County Wexford, Ireland on New Year's Day, 1830. His father, Mr. Hugh O'Neill, was principal of a school there. His mother was Kate (Navin) O'Neill. He was the eldest of twelve children.

O'Neill's interest in journalism began at an early age and he was a contributor to the Wexford Independent.

== Newspaper career ==
O'Neill emigrated to the United States in 1851 and settled in Pittsburgh. His first job was as a reporter with the Pittsburgh Dispatch newspaper, then owned by Colonel J. Heron Foster. After five years with the Dispatch, O'Neill took a job as local editor of a rival newspaper, the Chronicle. When the American Civil War broke out he covered the news for the Chronicle as a war correspondent.

Returning to Pittsburgh after the war, O'Neill purchased a share in the Dispatch Over time he and his brother Eugene M O'Neill eventually acquired full control of the Dispatch and Daniel acted as business manager and editor. Perhaps his impact at the paper can be summed up by comments which appeared at the time of his death;

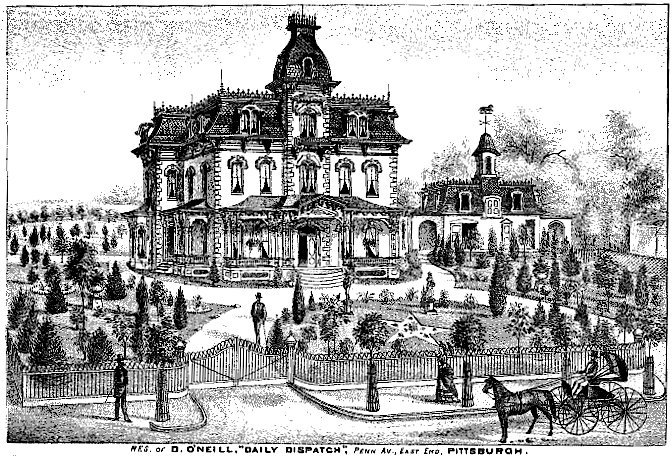
House built on Linden Street, Pittsburgh by Daniel O'Neill as it appeared circa 1876

No more convincing evidence of his indomitable energy could be adduced than that afforded in the success of the " Despatch." The paper had been run down for want of attention, but under the direction of the new firm it rapidly recovered the ground, and has reached its present successful condition. He turned a pigmy sheet into a powerful giant, made his name a household word in Pittsburg, and his paper a welcome visitor. As a writer, Mr. O'Neill possessed what is usually termed a trenchant pen. He was quick, incisive, and if occasion served, bitter. He was aggressive rather than inviting, and when in municipal affairs any scheme lacked his approbation, the public were sure to find it out, and that very soon. He was by no means a polished writer, though his education was classical and his reading varied. His unpolished sentences were wonderfully vigorous, however, and he may be said to have possessed a style almost incapable of imitation.

In addition to his activities with the newspaper, O'Neill served several terms in the Pittsburgh City Council and was a member of the Electoral College of Pennsylvania.

== Family ==
Daniel O'Neill was first married to Mary O'Neill, daughter of James O'Neill and Rebecca Burchell on 12 April 1853. They did not have children. He was next married to Emma Seely (1851–1910). Together they had three children, Florence O'Neill, a writer and composer who eventually joined his father managing the Dispatch, Emily Martha O'Neill and Daniel O'Neill.

Shortly after his death, Daniel's wife Emma married his brother Eugene M. O'Neill.

== Death and burial ==
About a year before his death, O'Neill completed construction of the family home called Linden House located on the corner of Penn Avenue and Linden Street in Pittsburgh. He died on 30 January 1877 and is interred at the Allegheny Cemetery in Pittsburgh.

== Memorial ==
At O'Neill's gravesite is a memorial statue showing him sitting at an editor's desk honoring his long career as a Pittsburgh newspaperman.
