= Bigham House =

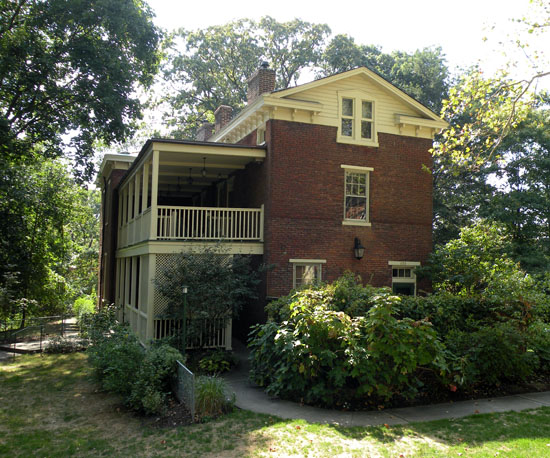

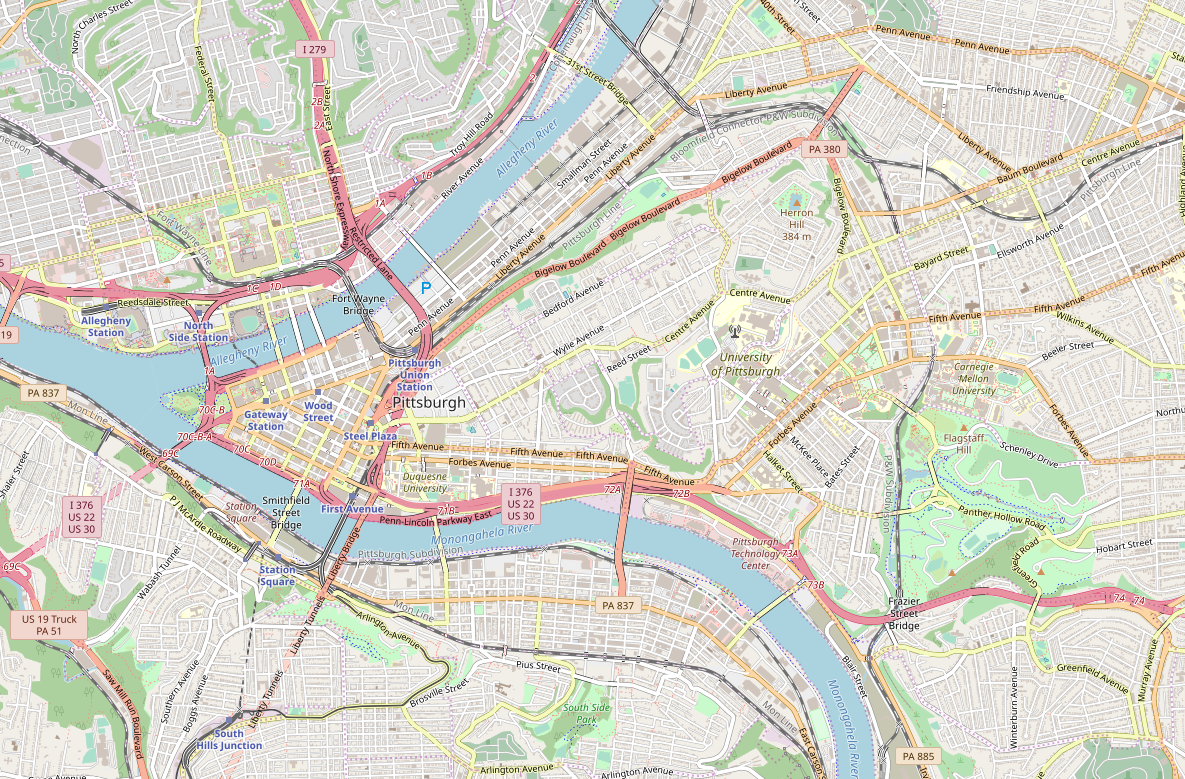
- Location of Bigham House in Downtown Pittsburgh
- 40°25′39.65″N 80°1′6.44″W
- Location: 655 Pennridge Road, Chatham Village (Mount Washington), Pittsburgh, Pennsylvania, USA

History
- Built: 1849

Pittsburgh Landmark – PHLF
- Designated: 1977

Bigham House located at 655 Pennridge Road in Chatham Village, in the Mount Washington neighborhood of Pittsburgh, Pennsylvania, was built in 1849. This was the former house of abolitionist lawyer Thomas James Bigham (1810–1884), and was "purportedly a station on the Underground Railroad." These days, this Classical Revival house is part of Chatham Village and is used as a community clubhouse known as Chatham Hall. Chatham Village is on the National Register of Historic Places and is a National Landmark District, and this house was individually added to the List of Pittsburgh History and Landmarks Foundation Historic Landmarks in 1990.

Bigham, known as "the Sage of Mt. Washington," served for many years as representative and senator in the Pennsylvania legislature. Also a newspaperman, he headed for a time the Commercial Journal and helped found the Pittsburgh Commercial.
