= Rachel Foster Avery =

American suffragist

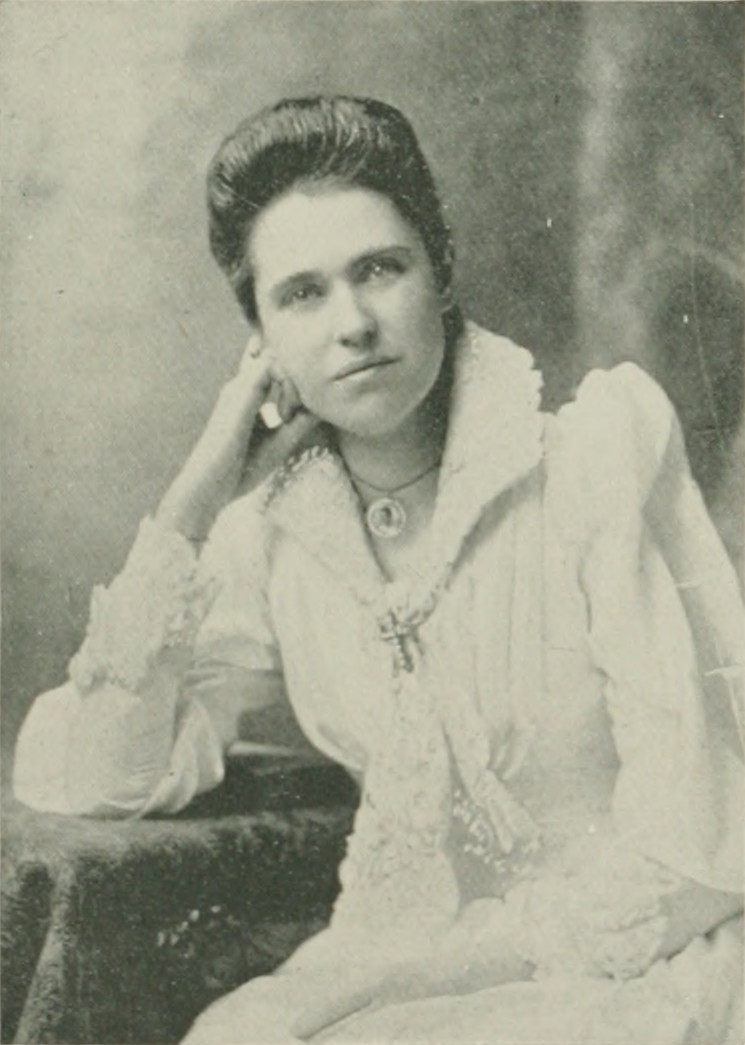
- Born: Rachel Foster; December 30, 1858; Pittsburgh, Pennsylvania, U.S.
- Died: October 26, 1919 (aged 60)
- Occupation(s): social activist, suffragist
- Spouse: Cyrus Miller Avery
- Relatives: Rosa Miller Avery (mother-in-law); J. Heron Foster (father)

Rachel Foster Avery (December 30, 1858 – October 26, 1919) was active in the American women's suffrage movement during the late 19th century, working closely with Susan B. Anthony and other movement leaders. She rose to be corresponding secretary of the National American Woman Suffrage Association and played a key role in organizing meetings across the country.

== Early years ==
Rachel Foster was born in Pittsburgh, Pennsylvania, to Julia Manuel Foster and J. Heron Foster, the editor of the Pittsburgh Dispatch. Her parents were progressive thinkers; her father taking the stance that women and men should receive equal pay for the same work, and her mother becoming an activist for women's right to vote, learning from women's rights leader Elizabeth Cady Stanton.

Stanton held suffrage meetings at the Foster home, and Rachel's mother became vice president of the local suffrage society. After J. Heron Foster's death in 1868, Rachel, her sister Julia, and her mother moved to Philadelphia, where they joined the Citizens' Suffrage Association.

== Career ==
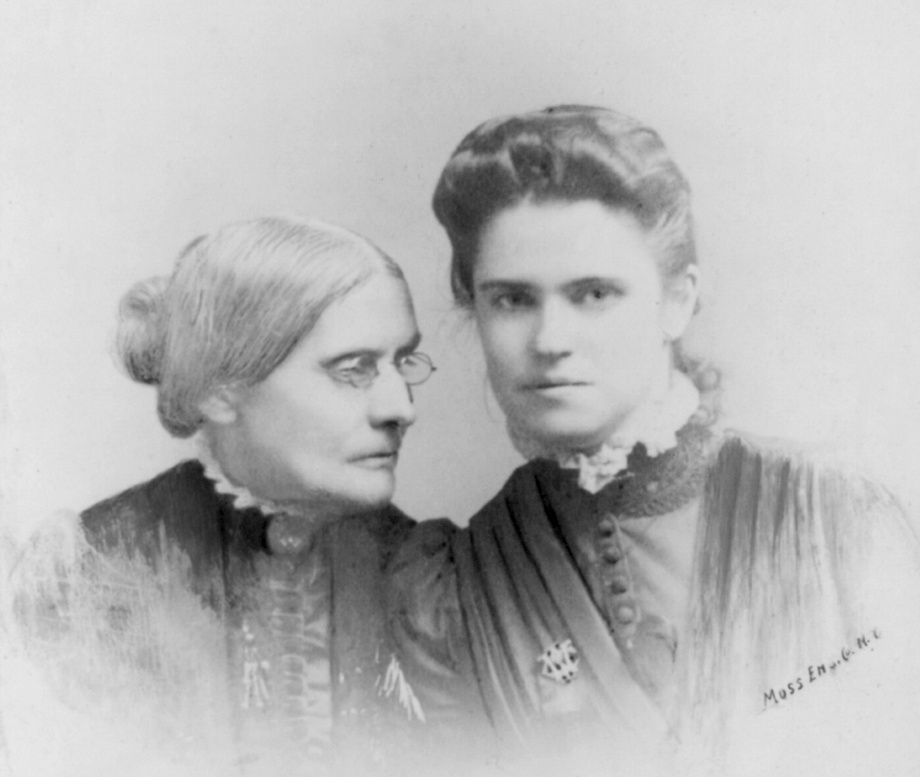
Susan B. Anthony (left) and Foster Avery (right)

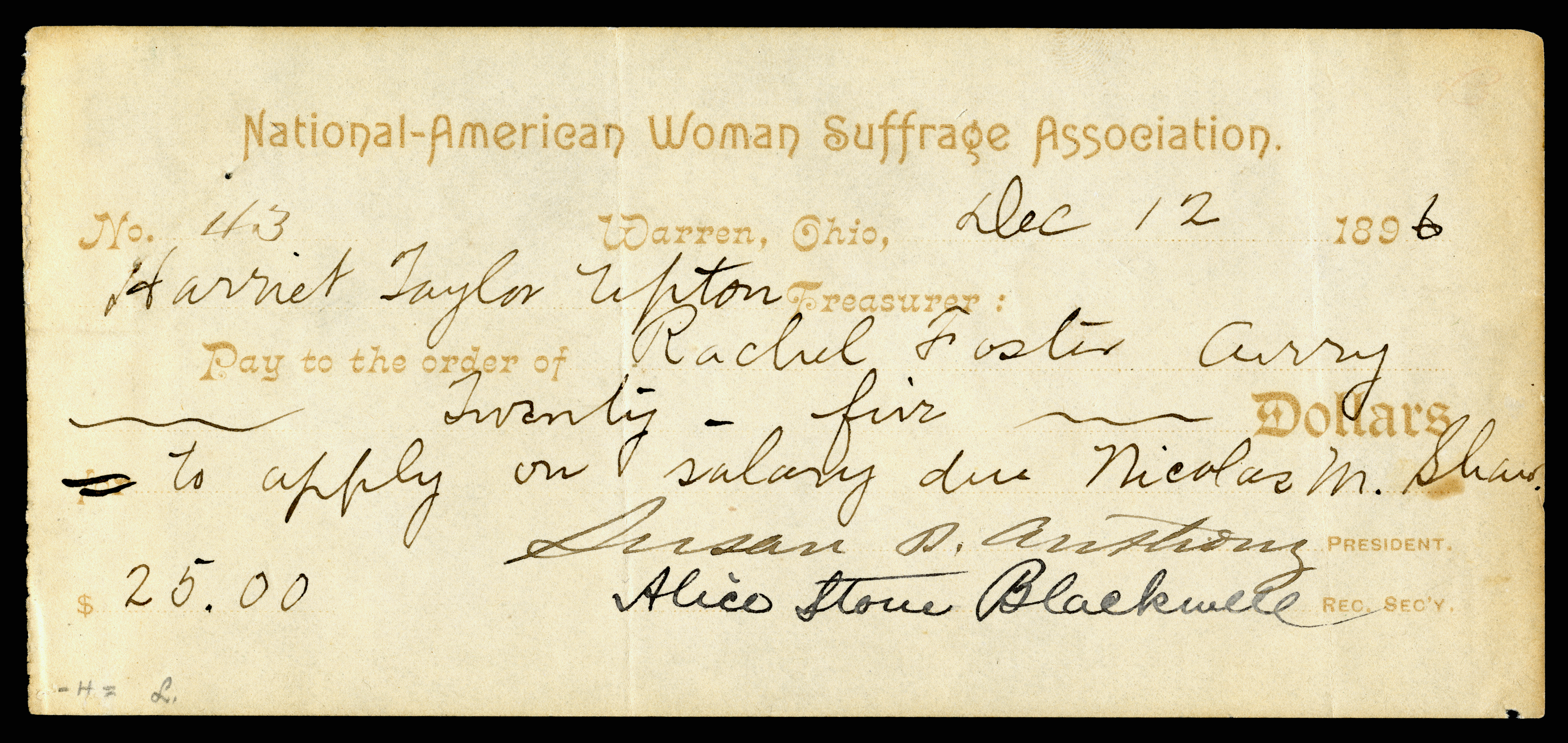
A NAWSA check payable to Avery, written by their treasurer Harriet Taylor Upton and signed by Susan B. Anthony and Alice Stone Blackwell

Avery began writing for newspapers at about age 17, sending letters from California and Europe to the Pittsburgh Leader. During this period, she studied at the University of Zurich.

When but 19 years of age, Avery and her elder sister, Julia Foster, were appointed vice-presidents for Pennsylvania of the National Woman Suffrage Association (NWSA). Two years later, Avery was elected as national corresponding secretary of that body, an office which she has held thereafter, with the exception of two years.

At age 21, she attended the 11th convention of NWSA and became actively involved in its work, planning and organizing more than a dozen of the association's meetings across the country in 1880 and 1881.

In 1882, she led the Nebraska campaign for an amendment to permit women to vote. Later, she disseminated throughout the state of Pennsylvania some 20,000 copies of a lecture by Governor John Hoyt of Wyoming, entitled "The Good Results of Thirteen Years' Experience of Women's Voting in Wyoming".

In 1883, Avery traveled through Europe with "Aunt Susan", as she called Susan B. Anthony. They traveled through France, Italy, Germany, and Switzerland.

In February 1888, Avery organized the International Council of Women in Washington, D. C., held under the auspices of NWSA. A major undertaking, the council draw in delegates from more than 50 different organizations from seven countries.

In the same year, a few months after the great International Council of Women, of which Avery was the secretary, she married Cyrus Miller Avery, son of Rosa Miller Avery, a prominent advocate for equal suffrage. The couple were equally strong in their advocacy of equal suffrage for men and women, and their idea of equal duties and equal rights was carried out in their home life.

Avery later held the office of corresponding secretary of NWSA, of the National Council of Women, and of the International Council of Women.

Avery supported the creation of the National American Woman Suffrage Association (NAWSA) out of the merger of NWSA and the American Woman Suffrage Association. She became NAWSA's first vice president, serving from 1907 until 1910. Avery resigned due to her belief that NAWSA was bending too much to the wishes of one of its wealthy new benefactors, Alva Belmont.

Avery participated in suffragist organizing at the state level as well, and ran the Pennsylvania Woman Suffrage Association in 1908.

== Personal life ==
In 1887, she adopted a baby girl, whom she named Miriam Alice Foster. On November 8, 1888, Foster married Cyrus Miller Avery (1854–1919), whom she had met when he was a delegate to the International Council of Women meeting earlier the same year. Their marriage was jointly performed by a male pastor, Charles G. Ames of the Unitarian Church, and a female pastor, Anna Howard Shaw, one of the first women to be ordained a Methodist minister in the United States. In addition to Miriam, the couple had two more children, Rose Foster Avery and Julia Foster Avery.
