= Thomas James Bigham =

American politician and abolitionist

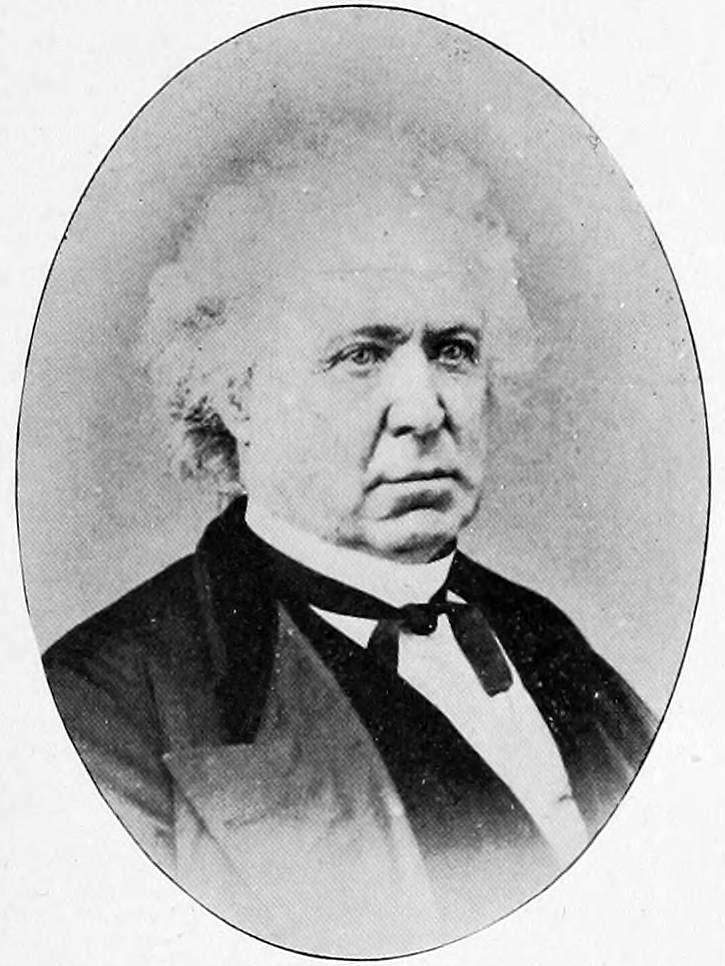

Member of the Pennsylvania Senate
- In office 1865–1868

Member of the Pennsylvania House of Representatives
- In office 1845–1847, 1851, 1854, 1862, 1864

Personal details
- Born: February 12, 1810 Hannastown, Pennsylvania, U.S.
- Died: November 9, 1884 (aged 74) Pittsburgh, Pennsylvania
- Resting place: Allegheny Cemetery
- Party: Republican (c. 1862) National Union (c. 1864) Whig (before 1862)
- Spouse: Maria Louisa Lewis (m. 1846)
- Children: 5

Thomas James Bigham (February 12, 1810 – November 9, 1884) was an American politician and abolitionist.

As a member of the Pennsylvania House of Representatives, Bigham served seven one-year terms representing Allegheny County, from 1845 to 1847 and in 1851, 1854, 1862, and 1864. He served in the Pennsylvania State Senate from 1865 to 1868 and was appointed in 1873 by Governor John F. Hartranft to serve as Chief of the Pennsylvania Bureau of Statistics. Once a Whig, he was later affiliated with the Republican Party.

Born in Hannastown in Westmoreland County, Pennsylvania, on February 12, 1810, he studied law at Jefferson College. Around 1837, he was admitted to the bar and began practicing law. Despite his career as a politician, his lifelong interest in science, including geology, and work with the Pennsylvania Bureau of Statistics earned him the nickname "Old Statistics". After the Great Fire of Pittsburgh, he rallied for aid, and secured the relief in the amount of $50,000 via an impassioned speech in the Pennsylvania State Capitol.

Bigham operated two local newspapers, the Commercial Journal and the Pittsburgh Commercial, the latter of which he was founder. He also founded Grace Episcopal Church (now Grace Anglican) in Mount Washington, where he lived much of his life.

He married Maria Louisa Lewis, younger sister of prominent Mount Washington mine operator Abraham Kirkpatrick Lewis and niece of Philadelphia banker William D. Lewis, on December 30, 1846 at Trinity Church. In 1850, they moved to a Kirkpatrick family property located on a wooded plot in what is now the Chatham Village section of Mount Washington, where they raised five children. The house, a stop on the Underground Railroad, is now designated as a Pittsburgh historic landmark.

Bigham died on November 9, 1884 in Pittsburgh, and was buried at Allegheny Cemetery.
