= Eugene M. O'Neill =

American lawyer and newspaper owner

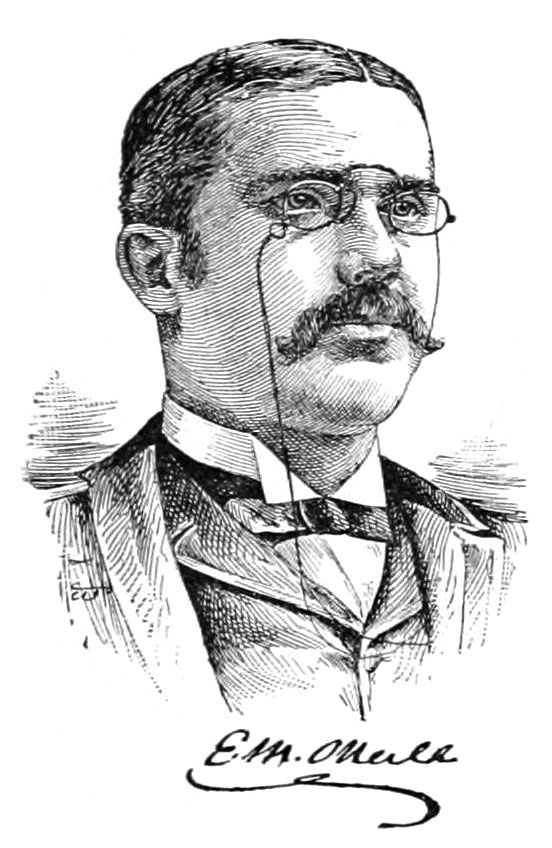
- Eugene M O'Neill, owner of the Pittsburgh Dispatch newspaper
- Born: 10 September 1850; Cloughbawn, County Wexford, Ireland
- Died: 26 November 1926 (aged 76); Pittsburgh, PA
- Known for: Editor and owner of the Pittsburgh Dispatch newspaper

Eugene M. O'Neill (September 10, 1850 – November 26, 1926) was an Irish-born American lawyer and newspaper owner.

== Biography ==
O'Neill was born in Clonroche, County Wexford, Ireland, the son of Hugh O'Neill, headmaster of town school, and Kate (Navin) O'Neill. He received his primary education at the local school run by his father then went to Trinity College Dublin, where he graduated at age 17.

After graduation, O'Neill emigrated to Pittsburgh, in the United States, in March 1867.

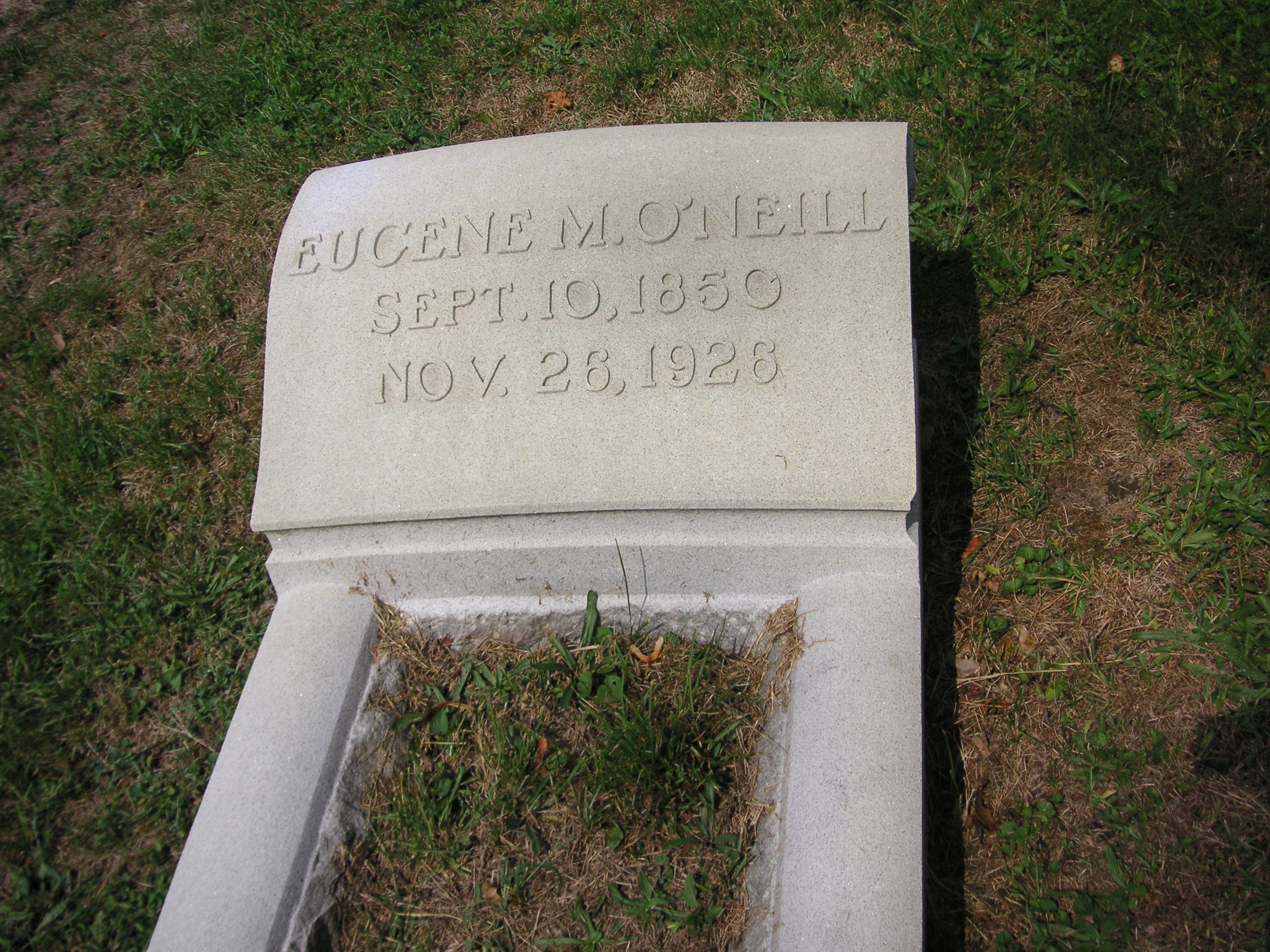
Grave of Eugene M O'Neill at Allegheny Cemetery in Pittsburgh

At the time, O'Neill's brother, Daniel O'Neill, was publisher, editor, and owner of the Pittsburgh Dispatch, and O'Neill started work on the paper as a reporter. He worked at the paper as an editorial writer until 1874, when he began practicing law. He was admitted to the bar of Allegheny County and practiced in both county and city courts for three years.

In 1875, he was elected City Councilman of Pittsburgh, the only political office he ever accepted. When his brother died on 30 January 1877, O'Neill took over management of the paper, a position he retained until again retiring from newspaper work in March 1902. In addition to practicing law and his work in journalism, O'Neill was an active investor in real estate and industry, accumulating a fortune which at his death was estimated at $8,000,000.

Eugene married Daniel's widow, Mrs Emily Martha "Emma" (Seely) O'Neill. They had no children. The couple lived in the family home "Linden House" in Pittsburgh, located on the corner of Penn Avenue and Linden Street. O'Neill died on 26 November 1926 at St Luke's Hospital in New York City after a three-month illness. The cause of death was pneumonia. After his death, he was interred at the Allegheny Cemetery.
