= Rosa Miller Avery =

American abolitionist, political reformer, suffragist and writer

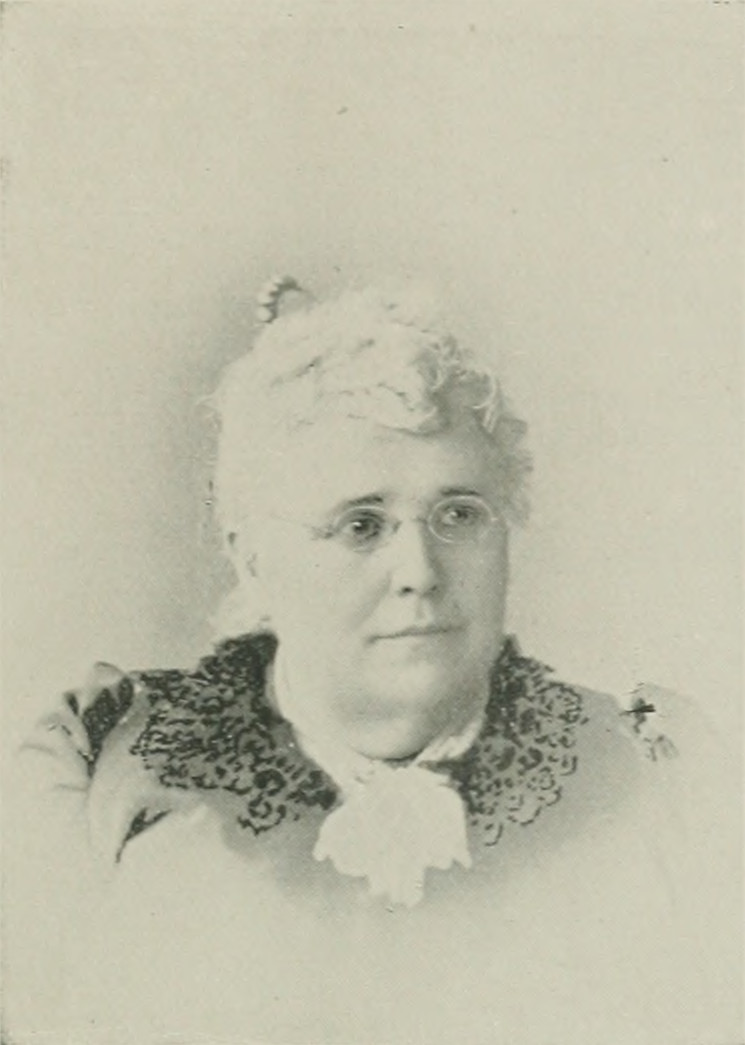
- Photo in A Woman of the Century
- Born: Rosa Mary Miller; May 21, 1830; Madison, Ohio, U.S.
- Died: November 9, 1894 (aged 64); Chicago, Illinois, U.S.
- Occupations: abolitionist; political reformer; suffragist; writer
- Spouse: Cyrus Avery (m. 1853)
- Relatives: Rachel Foster Avery (daughter-in-law)
- Writing career
- Pen name: Sue Smith; unknown male pseudonyms

Rosa Miller Avery née, Miller; (pen name, Sue Smith and unknown male pseudonyms; May 21, 1830 – November 9, 1894) was an American abolitionist, political reformer, second-generation suffragist, and writer.

Avery's childhood home was a noted "underground railroad station". As an adult, while living in Ashtabula, Ohio, she organized the first anti-slavery society of that time in that section of the United States. During the Civil War, she wrote constantly for the various papers and journals of that day on the union and emancipation, using a male pseudonym in order to gain attention. Many of her articles and responses to the opponents of franchise for women appeared in the Chicago Inter-Ocean. Her later writing, signed under "Sue Smith", were on social questions and topics useful to young people. After removing to Chicago, she took up the work of social purity and equal suffrage, writing many articles for the Chicago press on these subjects.

== Early life and education ==
Rosa Mary Miller was born in Madison, Ohio, May 21, 1830. She was of Scotch and English ancestry. Her grandfather, Capt. Isaac Miller, was a soldier of the American Revolutionary War and wounded at the Battle of Bunker Hill. Another kinsman, Gen. James Miller, was for a time aide-de-camp to Gen. George Washington. Her father, Nahum Miller, was a pioneer anti-slavery agitator. The "Miller farm" was as noted for its hospitality to every one who was in need of assistance or sympathy, as it was for its cattle and blooded stock, which claimed so much devotion and attention from Rosa as to cause her to be dubbed "Tomboy". From her maternal grandfather, James McDonald, she inherited a strong love of animals. Cattle shows and horse fairs delighted her, and she held Henry Bergh in high esteem.

Her father, Nahum Miller, was born in Vermont. He was one of the first settlers in the Madison area of Lake County, Ohio. He located on the county's Middle Ridge before there was a road there, made a clearing in the woods and built his cabin, and there developed a farm and passed his life. He was a reader of biblical and political history, and held broad humanitarian views. He loved children, adopting two in addition to five children of his own. Her mother, Esther McDaniels or McDonald, was a daughter of James McDonald, an early settler of Ashtabula County, Ohio. Esther hinted now and then, that "the laws pertaining to property and the holding of children were as oppressive for women as for negroes". Remembering this, Avery always spoke of her mother as her inspiration to work for woman's advancement. One of Avery's sisters was Roxana.

While attending the Madison seminary, Avery wrote stirring anti-slavery essays, which were met with derision and abuse. Two students in her school confessed to her that her anti-slavery papers induced them to give up their ambition for a career in religion to study law and politics.

== Career ==
On September 1, 1853, she married Cyrus Avery, of Oberlin, Ohio. During their residence in Ashtabula, Ohio, she organized the first anti-slavery society ever known in that village, but not a clergyman in the town would give notice of its meetings so late as two years before the American Civil War, and that, too, in the county home of Joshua Reed Giddings and Benjamin Wade. The leading men of wealth and influence were so indignant because the churches would not read a notice of her missionary effort for African Americans, that they counseled together and withdrew from their respective churches and built a brick church for the congregational sentiment of the town, which was decidedly anti-slavery.

During the years of the civil war, Avery's was actively engaged in writing for various journals on the subject of union and emancipation, using male pseudonyms, in order to command attention. Her letters and other articles attracted the notice of Gov. Richard Yates, of Illinois, James A. Garfield, James Redpath, and Lydia Maria Child, all of whom sent her appreciative letters.

"The men and women of to-day who are in earnest for woman's political emancipation stand on Mt. Sinai and make covenant with heaven for the speedy union of spiritual or woman's kingdom to man's or the material world." (Rosa Miller Avery, "Interior View of the Suffrage Question," New Era, 1 June 1885, p. 177.)

During ten years' residence in Erie, Pennsylvania, besides writing occasional articles for the newspaper, she disseminated her views on social questions, love, matrimony and religion in romance to high-school graduates in their organ, the High School News, over the pen name, "Sue Smith". About that time, her husband was appointed by the Young Men's Christian Association of Erie as visitor to the criminals confined in the city prison. Mrs. Avery assisted her husband in this work and became interested in the underlying motives and allurements associated with crime.

== Personal life and death ==
Avery's son, Cyrus, married the suffragist, Rachel Foster Avery.

Mr. and Mrs. Avery removed to Chicago in 1877. Her "Rose Cottage", in Edgewater, a suburb of Chicago, faced Lake Michigan.

In Chicago, Avery's attention was largely focused on social purity and suffrage work. She wrote many articles and responses to the opponents of franchise for women, which appeared from time to time in the Chicago Inter-Ocean under her signature. At the time of the dedication of the Frédéric Auguste Bartholdi statue (Statue of Liberty), Avery, when called upon to respond to the sentiment of "Liberty", at a banquet of representative men and women, spoke as follows:— "The idea of liberty for woman has become so prevailing, so penetrating, that even the stones cry out and take upon themselves the form of womanhood and proclaim 'Liberty Enlightening the World.'"

Avery died November 9, 1894, in Chicago.

Soon after Avery's funeral, a "Mrs. D." wrote to Sara A. Underwood:—

I will try to write you a brief account of my experience, at Rose Cottage on the 12th of November, 1894. It so chanced that I was seated, when the services began, in the back parlour just in front of the mantel, which faces, if you remember, the little alcove, where Rosa wrote. This room was her abiding place—the "home-nest" for her.

The clergyman stood just in front of the alcove. Shortly after he began to speak, I was conscious of a mist rising just at the entrance of the alcove —his words, became to me more and more indistinct, as the mist took shape, and form—when lo! before my eyes stood our friend, issuing from the alcove. I saw her dress, even to details—it was a lovely robe—rose-coloured with a surplice waste, folding over to the left side, at which point, long ribbons fell. It was not till afterward, that I recognized the significance of the color, which illustrated her love, so marked for roses, while in the body. She passed in and out amongst the people assembled there, as if at a reception, and finally came and stood before me, uttering in most emphatic tones these words: "E. D., I am risen."

I was somewhat surprised afterward to learn, that, when, before Mrs. Avery died she was asked if she would manifest herself, when out of the body. Her reply was, "I will come to either Sara Underwood or E. D., for they are my true friends." She has come to me in various ways, since then. At one time, I was running over some chords on the piano—when suddenly Mrs. A. stood behind me—saying, "O, the inexpressible freedom of being able to go, where and when one chooses." But I have omitted in my descriptions of Rosa's coming on the t2th November, one of the important points. She was no longer large and portly—only well-proportioned, and young in figure, as in face.
