= Chatham Village =

Community in Pittsburgh, Pennsylvania, US

- Chatham Village Historic District
- U.S. National Register of Historic Places
- U.S. National Historic Landmark District
- Pittsburgh Landmark – PHLF
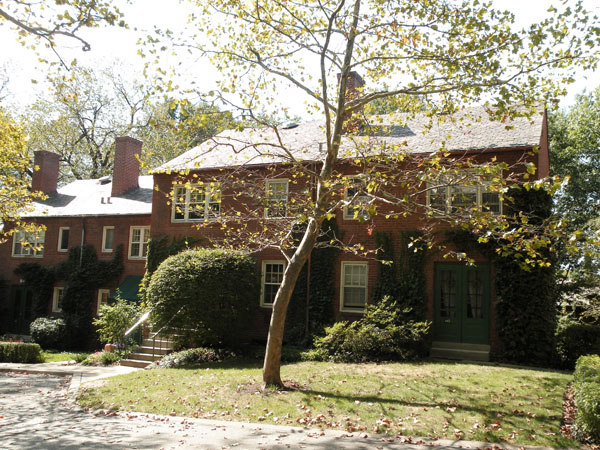
- Some houses in the Chatham Village Historic District

- Location within Pittsburgh Location within Pennsylvania Location within the United States
- Location: Roughly bounded by Virginia Ave., Bigham St., Woodruff St., Saw Mill Run Blvd., and Olympia Rd., Pittsburgh, Pennsylvania
- Coordinates: 40°25′52″N 80°1′1″W
- Area: 46 acres (19 ha)
- Built: 1932 to 1936
- Architect: Clarence Stein and Henry Wright
- Architectural style: Georgian Colonial Revival, Classical Revival
- NRHP reference No.: 98001372

Significant dates
- Added to NRHP: November 25, 1998
- Designated NHLD: April 5, 2005
- Designated PHLF: 1990

Chatham Village is a community within the larger Mount Washington neighborhood of the city of Pittsburgh, Pennsylvania, and an internationally acclaimed model of community design. It is roughly bounded by Virginia Avenue, Bigham Street, Woodruff Street, Saw Mill Run Boulevard, and Olympia Road, and was declared a National Historic Landmark in 2005 as a remarkably well-preserved example of Garden City Movement design.

The village is owned and operated as a cooperative by its residents.

== History ==
Chatham Village was built 1932–1936, and was designed by Clarence Stein and Henry Wright on the principles of the Garden City Movement of the early 20th century. It was created in the Georgian Colonial Revival style, and was built to show that affordable housing for the working class could be attractive and safe. It quickly became a middle- and upper-class neighborhood, however, because it was so attractive. The funding was provided by Pittsburgh's Buhl Foundation.

== Relevance ==
In 2007, Chatham Village was included in the American Planning Association's list of Great Neighborhoods as part of its Great Places in America program, which recognized ten neighborhoods from across the nation for good design, function, sustainability, and community involvement.

In The Death and Life of Great American Cities, writer Jane Jacobs criticizes Chatham Village as an example of how Garden City planning created islands of class homogeneity, thus fostering economic and social distance within Pittsburgh and other cities. Jacobs cites Chatham Village residents' inabilities to cooperate with other parents once their children entered the more economically and socially diverse local junior high school, which drew lower-class and lower-middle-class students from outside of Chatham Village. In Jacobs' view, the success of Chatham Village as an urban community in a park-like setting depended upon the residents' tendencies to trust one another due to the similarities in their professional, economic, and social status. The ideals of city planning expressed in the Garden City Movement, Jacobs argues, are only suitable for upper-middle-class lifestyles and, thus, fail to engage the endemic economic and social diversity of cities.

== The homes ==
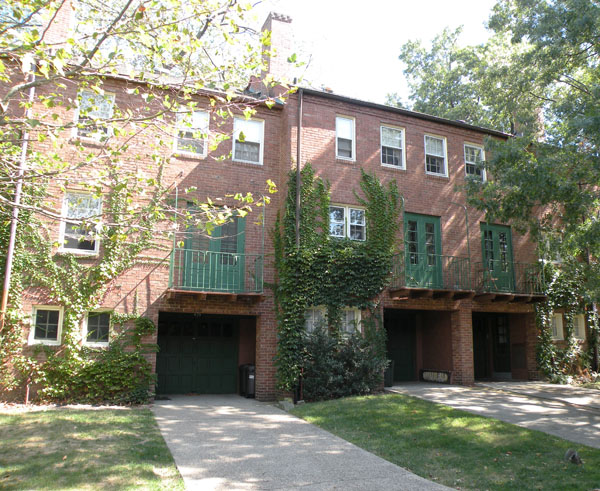
View of the back of some homes (with deeply recessed garages) fronting on the street

The homes are red-brick-and-slate-roof townhomes. They are situated in clusters toward interior courtyards with their rears facing the loop roads around the property. The homes do have rear-access integral garages in the basements, but these are recessed several feet to greatly reduce the visual impact.

The community is regarded as one of the best-preserved examples of the Garden City concept by city planners, architects, and landscape architects. It is also a National Historic Landmark, on the National Register of Historic Places, and is on the List of Pittsburgh History and Landmarks Foundation Historic Landmarks.

== Chatham Hall ==
The complex includes the Bigham House (former home of Thomas Bigham), originally built in 1849, and renovated for use as a community clubhouse, known as Chatham Hall. Thomas James Bigham (1810–1884) was an abolitionist lawyer, and his house was "purportedly a station on the Underground Railroad".

== Gallery ==
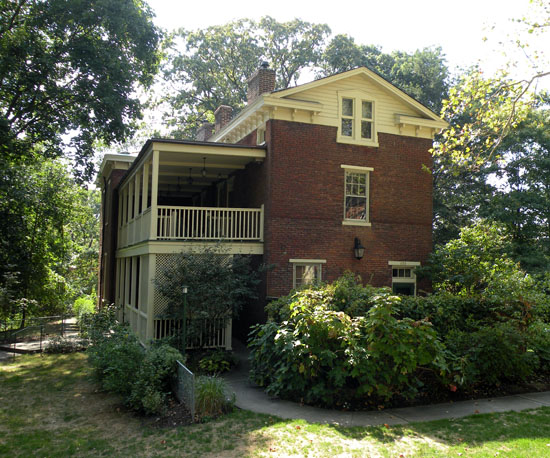
Bigham House, built in 1849, now known as Chatham Hall

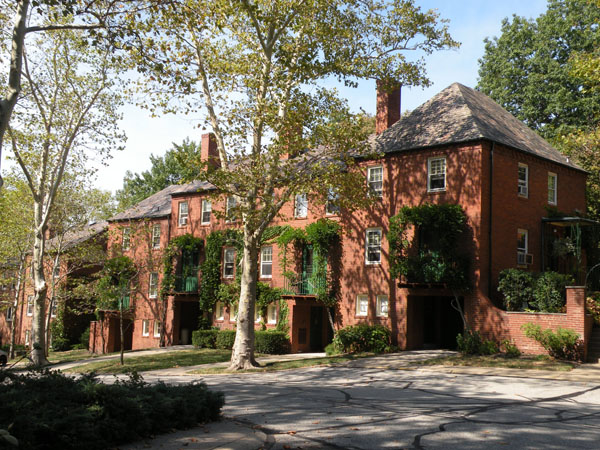
The garage side of some townhouses in Chatham Village

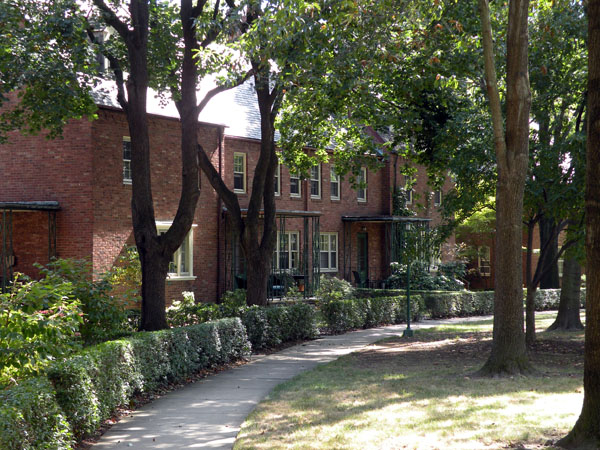
View of shared green space in front of some homes

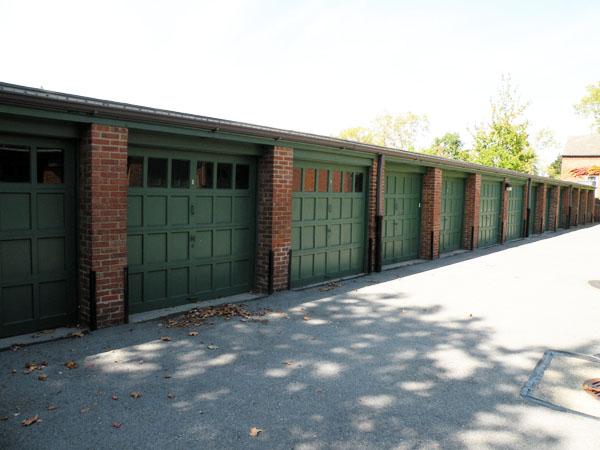
A garage area for those whose townhouses don't have built-in garages

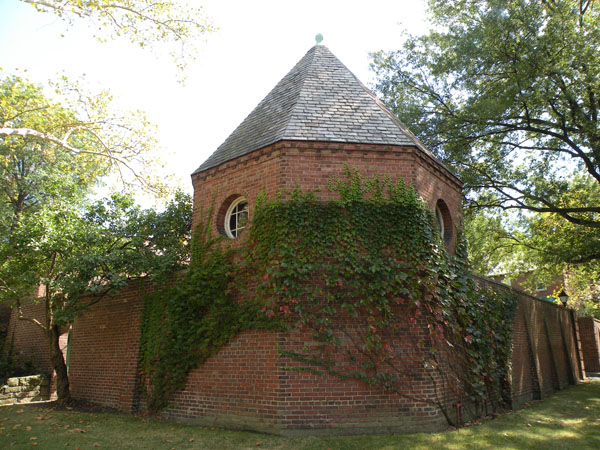
A castle-like wall around a parking area

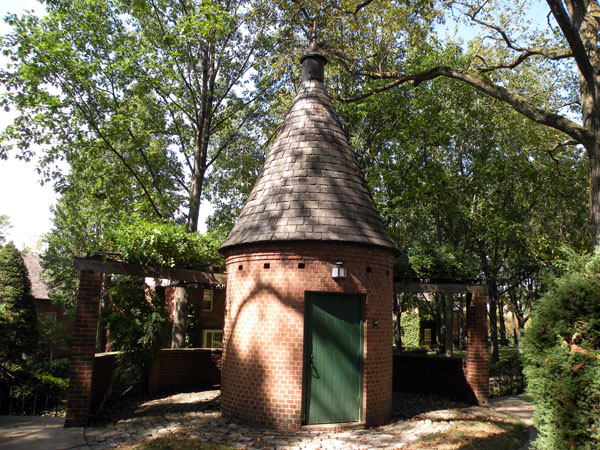
A garden folly with an overhead trellis around part of it
