= Commercial Journal =

19th-century newspaper published in Pittsburgh, Pennsylvania, United States

- Type: Daily and weekly (and sometimes triweekly) newspaper
- Founder(s): J. Heron Foster, J. McMillin, J. B. Kennedy
- Founded: 19 April 1843
- Ceased publication: 8 May 1861
- Political alignment: Independent; Whig; American; Republican
- Language: English
- City: Pittsburgh, Pennsylvania
- Country: United States

The Commercial Journal was a mid-19th century newspaper in Pittsburgh, Pennsylvania, United States.

== Beginnings ==
The paper was founded as the Spirit of the Age by J. Heron Foster, J. McMillin and J. B. Kennedy on 19 April 1843, with Foster as editor. Both daily and weekly editions were published.

R. White Middleton bought the young paper in mid-1844 and edited it for less than a year until "sickness, poverty and oppression" drove him to quit. Foster retook the editorship for a short time before moving on and founding the Pittsburgh Dispatch.

== Riddle era ==
In the middle of 1845, the daily title changed under new ownership to Daily Commercial Journal and Spirit of the Age, the latter half of which was eventually dropped. The name change signified that the paper would cater more than before to the interests of "the Manufacturer, the Farmer, and Merchant." New editor Robert M. Riddle, formerly postmaster of Pittsburgh and editor of the Advocate, promised to replace the paper's previous political neutrality with a "thorough going Whig" slant in accordance with his own party affiliation.

In 1853 Riddle was elected with Whig backing as mayor of Pittsburgh, which post he filled a single one-year term, at the same time continuing to manage the newspaper. As the Whig Party fell apart soon afterward, Riddle and the Journal shifted support to the ephemeral American Party before aligning with the up-and-coming Republican organization, all the while maintaining an anti-slavery, pro-Northern stance.

Pittsburgh newspaper consolidation timeline

The abolitionist weekly Saturday Visiter, founded by editor Jane Swisshelm in 1847, was published from the Commercial Journal office. In 1854 it merged into the Journal's weekly edition, at the time called Family Journal, to form the Family Journal and Saturday Visiter. Swisshelm edited a "Visiter Department" within the merged edition. From this platform she promoted the causes of anti-slavery, temperance, and women's rights.

Riddle conducted the Journal until 1858, when failing health prompted him to sell his interest to Thomas J. Bigham, who assumed editorial charge. Bigham was an abolitionist Republican who purportedly used his house as a refuge on the Underground Railroad.

== Consolidation ==
The Commercial Journal merged into Pittsburgh's oldest paper, the Gazette, at the dawn of the Civil War in 1861. The consequently titled Daily Pittsburgh Gazette and Commercial Journal explained that "Both papers have long advocated essentially the same political principles and labored in the same cause, so that their separate publication was not essential to any public or political interest, while to advertisers the union will be one of great advantage."
