= Jane Swisshelm =

American journalist, publisher, abolitionist, women's rights advocate (1815–1884)

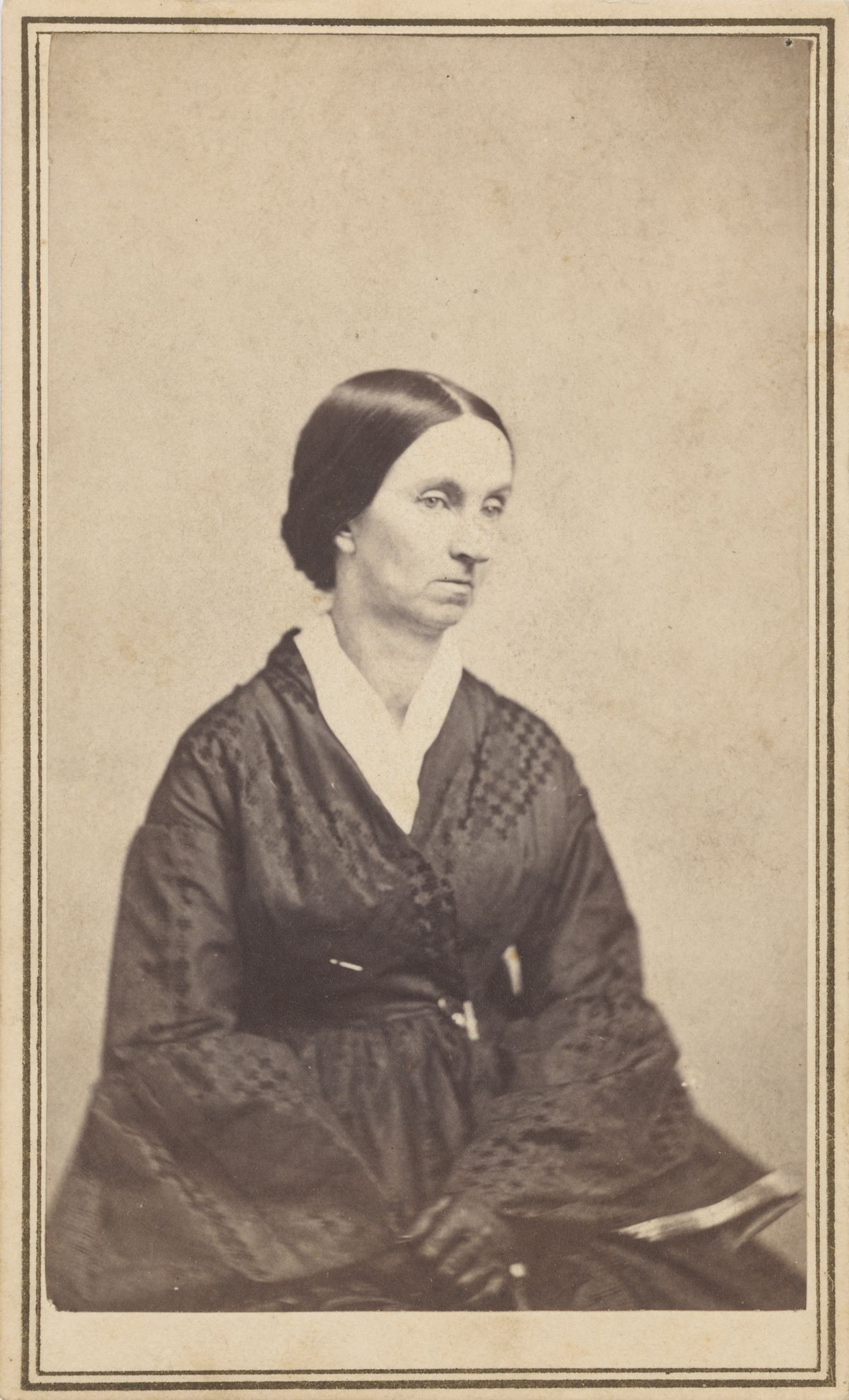
- Swisshelm c. 1865 by Joel Emmons Whitney
- Born: Jane Grey Cannon; December 6, 1815; Pittsburgh, Pennsylvania, U.S.
- Died: July 22, 1884 (aged 68); Pittsburgh, Pennsylvania, U.S.
- Occupations: Journalist, publisher
- Known for: Advocacy in favor of women's rights and against slavery

Jane Grey Cannon Swisshelm (December 6, 1815 – July 22, 1884) was an American Radical Republican journalist, publisher, abolitionist, and women's rights advocate. She was one of America's first female journalists hired by Horace Greeley at his New York Tribune. She was active as a writer in Pittsburgh, Pennsylvania, and as a publisher and editor in St. Cloud, Minnesota.

While working for the federal government in Washington, D.C., during the administration of President Andrew Johnson, Swisshelm founded her last newspaper, Reconstructionist. Her published criticism of Johnson led to her losing her job and the closing of the paper. She published her autobiography in 1881.

== Early life and education ==
Swisshelm was born Jane Grey Cannon in Pittsburgh, Pennsylvania, U.S., one of several children of Mary (Scott) and Thomas Cannon, both of whom were Presbyterians of Scotch-Irish descent. Her father was a merchant and real estate speculator.

In 1823, when Jane was eight years of age, both her sister Mary and her father died of consumption, leaving the family in straitened circumstances. Jane worked at manual labor, doing lace making and painting on velvet, and her mother colored leghorn and straw hats. At twelve, she was sent to boarding school for several weeks, as there were no public schools at the time. When she returned home, she learned that the doctor thought she was in the first stage of consumption. Her mother had already lost four of her children to illnesses. She moved with her children to Wilkinsburg, a village outside Pittsburgh, and started a store. After more formal study, Jane started teaching classes for village children in 1830. That year, her family learned that her older brother, William, much loved by all, had died of yellow fever in New Orleans, where he had gone for work.

== Career ==
On November 18, 1836, at age 20, Cannon married James Swisshelm, from a nearby town. They moved to Louisville, Kentucky, in 1838, where James intended to go into business with his brother, Samuel. This is where Jane first encountered slavery, which made a strong impression on her. Nearby was a man who had sold away his own mixed-race children. She wrote in her autobiography of some of the sights she saw and stories she heard.

In 1839, against her husband's wishes, she moved to Philadelphia to care for her ailing mother. After her mother's death, she headed a girls' seminary in Butler, Pennsylvania. Two years later, she rejoined her husband on his farm, which she called Swissvale, east of Pittsburgh. (Today the area is Edgewood).

=== Activism and newspaper writing ===
During this time, Swisshelm began writing articles against capital punishment, and stories, poems, and articles for an anti-slavery newspaper, the Spirit of Liberty, and others in Pittsburgh. Prompted by the demise of the Spirit of Liberty and the similarly themed Albatross, Swisshelm founded the newspaper Saturday Visiter [sic] in 1847. It eventually reached a national circulation of 6,000, and in 1854 was merged with the weekly edition of the Pittsburgh Commercial Journal. She wrote many editorials advocating women's property rights.

On April 17, 1850, while working for the New York Tribune, she became the first female reporter admitted to the reporters gallery of the U. S. Senate. Both her presence and her account of that day's fracas, in which Mississippi Senator Henry Foote drew a pistol when Missouri Senator Thomas Hart Benton charged at him, were widely noted. According to a Wisconsin newspaper, "nobody but a regular woman could make a description of such a scene so interesting. That jerking, nervous, half breathless excitement which would embarrass the narrative of a man only adds piquancy and grace to that of a woman."

In 1857, Swisshelm divorced her husband and moved west to St. Cloud, Minnesota, where she controlled a string of newspapers. She promoted abolition and women's rights by writing and lecturing. The city was a developing center of trade, located on the Mississippi in the central part of the eastern border of the state.

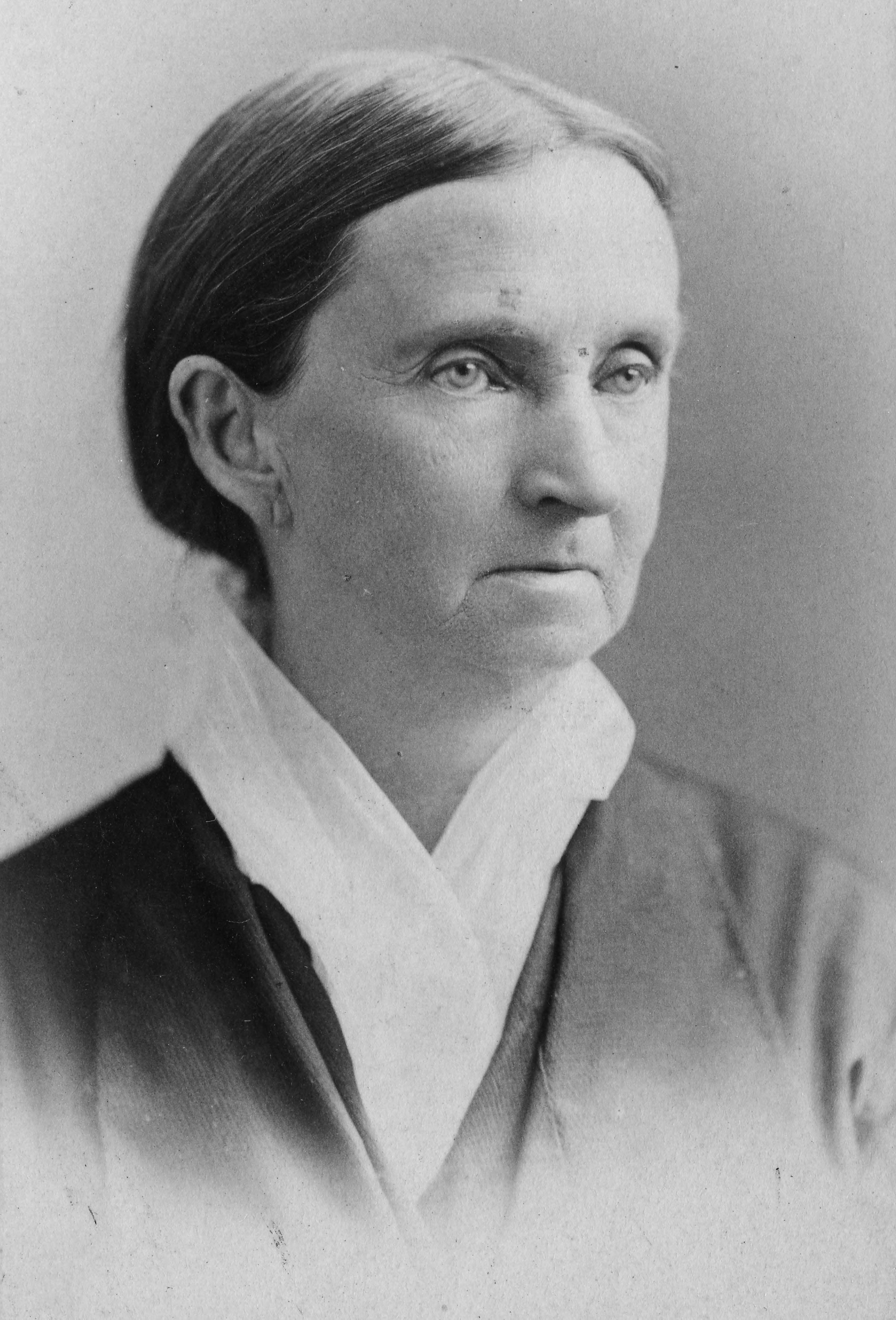
Jane Grey Swisshelm, 1860-1884

Writing in The Saint Cloud Visiter, Swisshelm waged a private war against Sylvanus Lowry, a Southern slaveholder and Indian trader who had settled in the area in 1847. Politically influential, he had been elected to the Territorial Council, and as the city's first mayor in 1856. By then he reigned as Saint Cloud's Democratic political boss. Swisshelm was especially infuriated that Lowry owned slaves, as Minnesota was a free state.

But, in 1857 the Supreme Court of the United States ruled in the Dred Scott case that slaves had no standing as citizens to file freedom suits, and that the Missouri Compromise was unconstitutional, so the state's prohibition against slavery could not be enforced. More Southerners migrated to St. Cloud and Minnesota with slaves. After the outbreak of the Civil War, most Southerners returned to the South, taking their slaves with them.

Writing in The Visiter, Swisshelm accused Lowry of swindling the local Winnebago as a trader, ordering vigilante attacks on suspected land claim jumpers, and abusing his slaves. He started a rival paper, The Union, to offset her influence.

After one of her fiery editorials, Lowry formed a "Committee of Vigilance", broke into the newspaper's offices, smashed the printing press, and threw the pieces into the nearby Mississippi River. Swisshelm soon raised money for another press and raised her attacks to a fever pitch. Formerly being groomed for the state post of Lieutenant Governor, Lowry saw his influence over Saint Cloud politics lessened but was elected to the state senate in 1862. He died young in 1865 in St. Cloud.

=== Civil War years ===
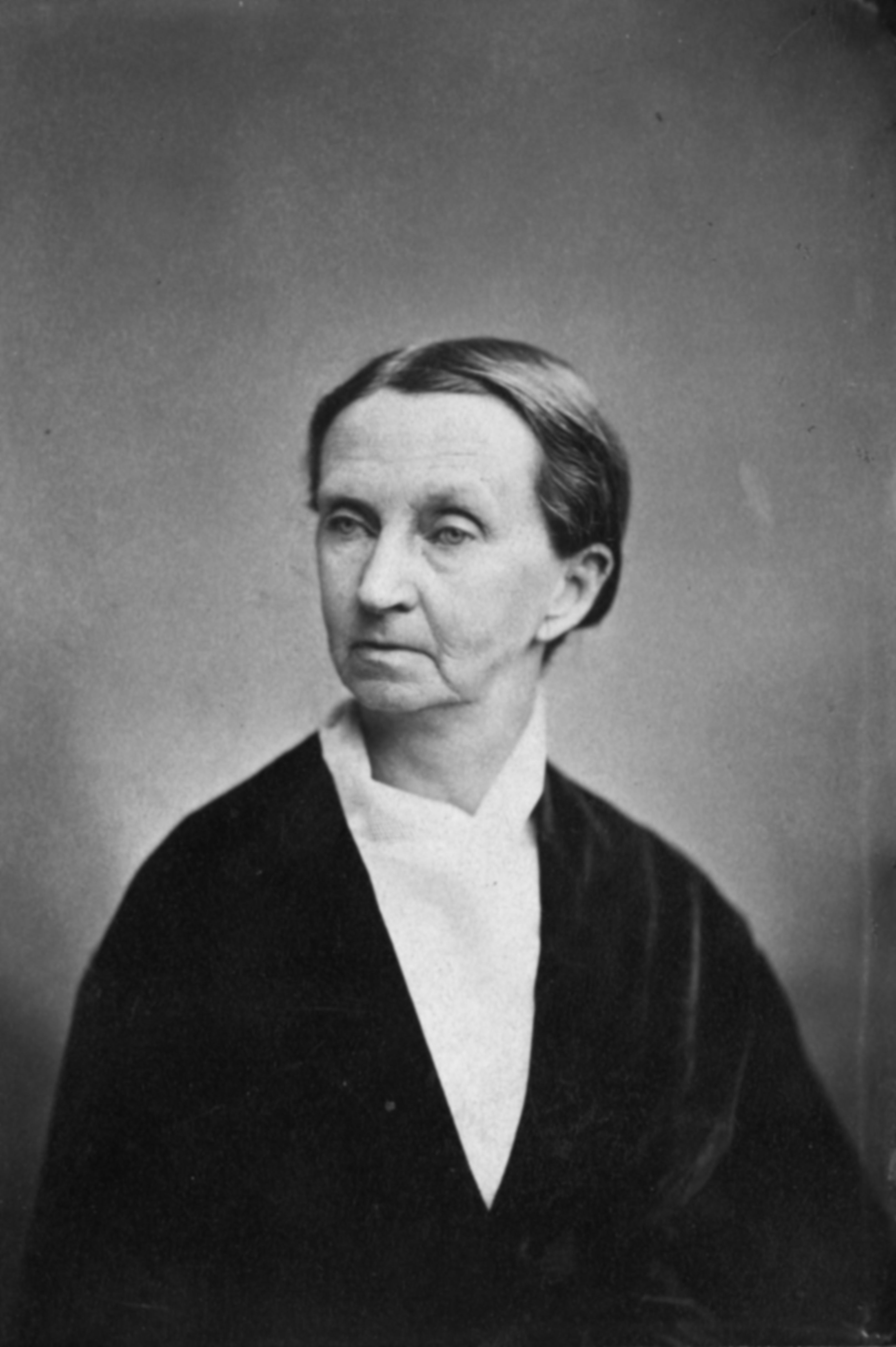
Jane Grey Swisshelm, 1860-1884

When Abraham Lincoln was nominated for the presidency, Swisshelm spoke and wrote in his behalf. When the American Civil War began and nurses were wanted at the front, she was one of the first to respond. After the Battle of the Wilderness, she had charge of 182 badly wounded men at Fredericksburg for five days, without surgeon or assistant, and saved them all.

In 1862, when a Sioux Indian uprising in Minnesota resulted in the deaths of hundreds of white settlers, Swisshelm was among those demanding the federal government punish the Indians. She toured major cities to raise public opinion about this issue and, while in Washington, D.C., met with Edwin M. Stanton, a friend from Pittsburgh and then Secretary of War. He offered her a clerkship in the government. She sold her Minnesota paper and continued to work as an army nurse during the Civil War in the Washington area until her job became available.

== Later life and death ==
After the war, Swisshelm founded her final newspaper, the Reconstructionist. Her attacks on President Andrew Johnson led to her losing the paper and her government job. In 1872, she attended the Prohibition Party convention as a delegate.

Swisshelm published Letters to Country Girls (New York, 1853), a collection of newspaper columns she had launched in 1849, and an autobiography entitled Half of a Century (1881).

Swisshelm died on July 22, 1884, at her Swissvale home and is buried in Allegheny Cemetery. The city of Pittsburgh neighborhood of Swisshelm Park, adjacent to Swissvale, is named in her honor.

A new edition of Swisshelm's autobiography was published in 2005.

== See also ==
- Anna Elizabeth Dickinson
