= Pittsburgh Saturday Visiter =

U.S. newspaper (1847–1854)

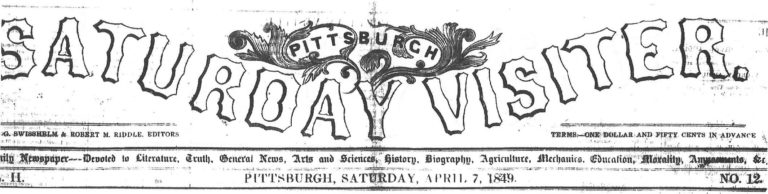
Pittsburgh Saturday Visiter [sic] masthead, April 7, 1849

The Pittsburgh Saturday Visiter [sic] was an abolitionist and women's rights paper printed in Pittsburgh. Founded in 1847, the paper was edited by Jane Swisshelm and printed by Robert M. Riddle. It had good circulation numbers and ran until 1854.

== History ==
Journalist Jane Swisshelm was the founder of the Pittsburgh Saturday Visiter [sic] and she funded the work through money in her own estate and printed the paper with Robert M. Riddle. Swisshelm served as the editor and Riddle printing the paper. At the time, the abolitionist newspaper in Pittsburgh had closed and a new paper was needed. She launched the Saturday Visiter on December 20, 1847. There were crowds actually waiting in the streets for the first issue. Swisshelm's spelling of "visitor" as "visiter" was acceptable at the time and had precedent in such titles as the Baltimore Saturday Visiter and the Pittsburgh Saturday Evening Visiter.

The Saturday Visiter published women's rights, temperance, and abolitionist editorials. She also endorsed Free Soil arguments against slavery. The paper had a good circulation with around 6,000 subscribers, though more subscribers actually lived outside of Pennsylvania.

Eventually, Swisshelm started looking to sell the Visiter in 1853, and looked for someone with similar political views as herself. After Swisshelm had a child, she realized that she was neglecting the work on the Visiter. The paper itself went bankrupt by 1854, despite its good circulation and was sold to Riddle. Riddle merged the paper with the weekly edition of his Commercial Journal, keeping Swisshelm on as editor.

== Reception ==
Frederick Douglass said, "There are few papers exerting greater influence than the Saturday Visiter, edited by Mrs. Swisshelm."
