= J. Heron Foster =

American journalist and politician

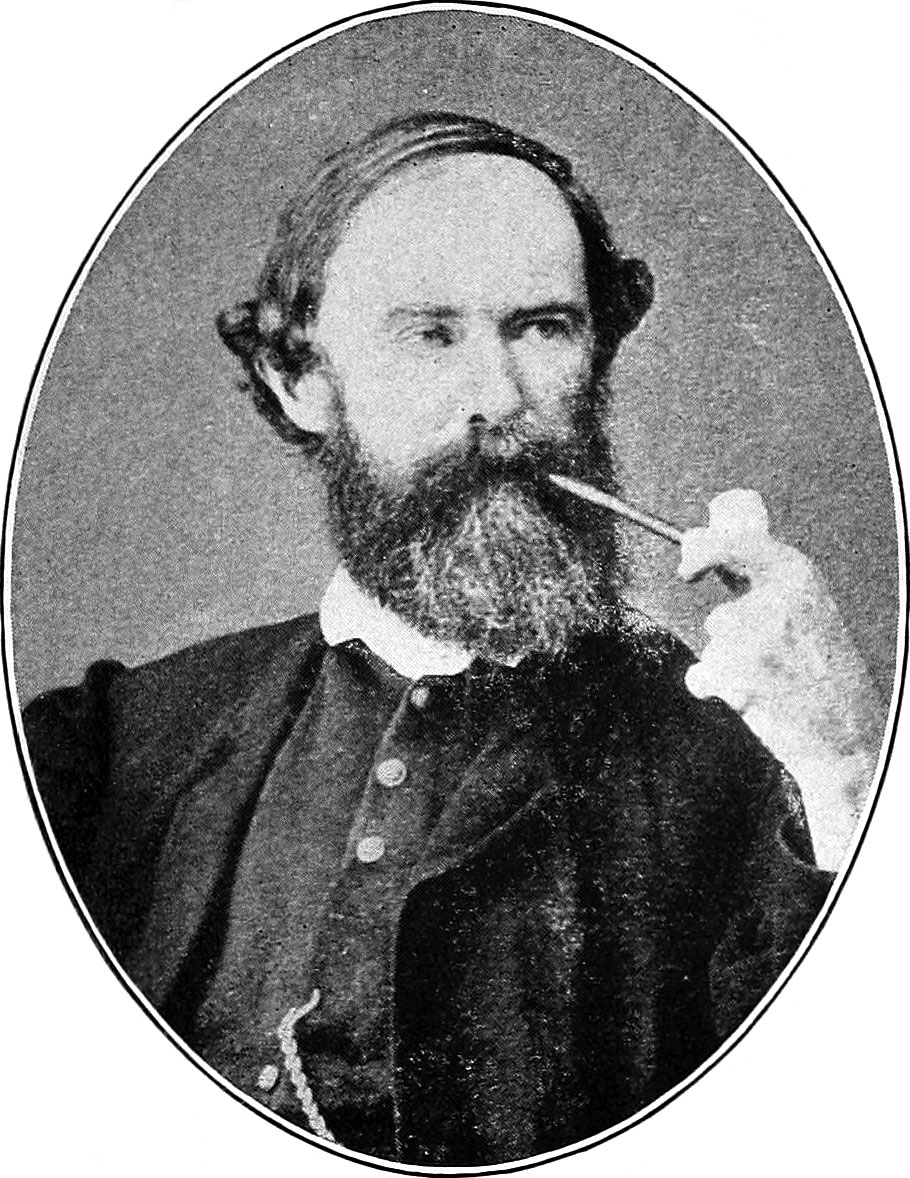
J. Heron Foster

James Heron Foster (18 April 1822 – 21 April 1868) was a journalist and politician of Pittsburgh, Pennsylvania. He was the founding editor of three Pittsburgh newspapers, most notably the Pittsburgh Dispatch.

== Biography ==
Born in Greensburg, Pennsylvania on 18 April 1822, Foster became a resident of Pittsburgh in the spring of 1831. He was the youngest son of Alexander W. Foster, for many years a prominent attorney in Western Pennsylvania.

As a youth Foster worked as an apprentice in the printing business. At the age of only nineteen years, he became the initial editor of the Pittsburgh Morning Chronicle in company with publisher Richard G. Berford. Foster was a social and moral crusader from his earliest editorials, targeting such vices as drunkenness, corner loafing, and desecration of the Sabbath. Subsequent to his time at the Chronicle, he co-founded and edited the Spirit of the Age, which, after he left it, became the Commercial Journal. In 1846 he put out the first issue of the Dispatch, the paper with which he was connected in editorial and ownership roles for the rest of his life.

A staunch opponent of slavery, Foster was nominated by a Free Soil Party convention in late 1852 for Mayor of Pittsburgh. He ran a distant third for that office behind the two main-party candidates. By 1855 he had aligned himself with the Know Nothings; historian Michael F. Holt called him "the city's leading Know Nothing editor." Foster was elected to the Pennsylvania House of Representatives for the 1858 session and again for the 1859 session, each time on a fusion ticket comprising Republicans and allies.

Foster served as an officer in the Civil War, eventually attaining the post of district Provost Marshal. After the war, he was brevetted from captain to colonel for meritorious service. He had been known as "Colonel" even before the war, from his rank in the state militia.

After a lengthy struggle with lung disease, Foster died on 21 April 1868 at his home in Allegheny City. A funeral procession more than a mile long escorted the remains to Allegheny Cemetery. Mark Twain, in his travelogue The Innocents Abroad (1869), noted with sadness the loss of the man he called "a most estimable gentleman." The two had met on the overseas voyage on which the book was based.

Foster's three children with wife Julia Manuel Foster included suffragist Rachel Foster Avery.
