= Pittsburgh Sun-Telegraph =

Defunct American daily newspaper

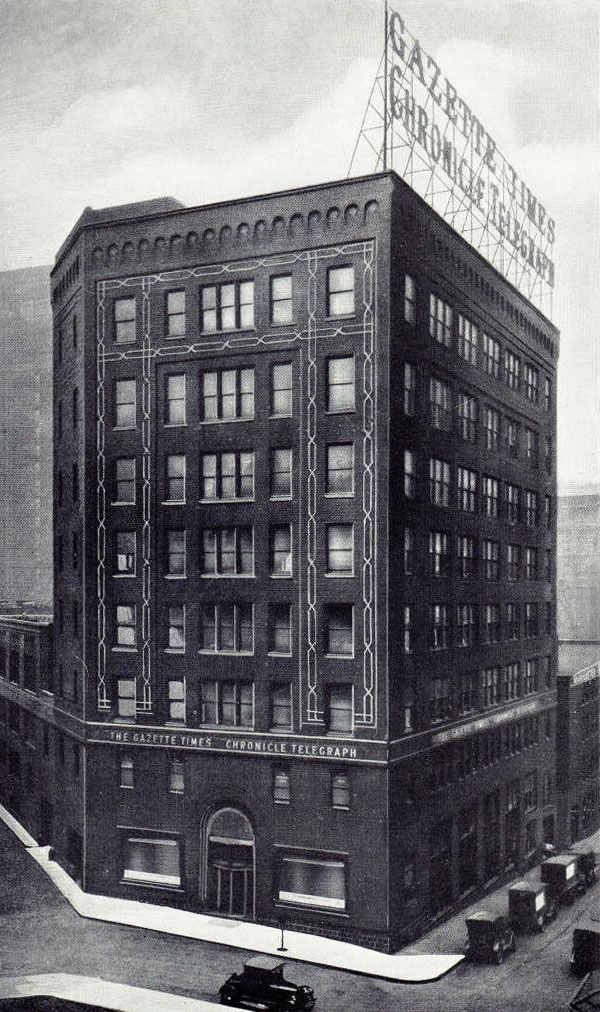
- Publication building of the Chronicle Telegraph and Gazette Times (1915–1927), the Sun-Telegraph (1927–1960), and the Post-Gazette (1960–1961).
- Type: Evening daily newspaper
- Format: Broadsheet
- Owner: Hearst Corporation (from 1927)
- Founded: August 1, 1927 (from merger)
- Ceased publication: 1960
- Headquarters: Pittsburgh, Pennsylvania, United States
- OCLC number: 2266192

The Pittsburgh Sun-Telegraph was an evening daily newspaper published in Pittsburgh, Pennsylvania from 1927 to 1960. Part of the Hearst newspaper chain, it competed with The Pittsburgh Press and the Pittsburgh Post-Gazette until being purchased and absorbed by the latter paper.

== Predecessors ==
The Sun-Telegraph's history can be traced back through its 19th- and early 20th-century forebears: the Chronicle, Telegraph, Chronicle Telegraph, and Sun.

=== Chronicle ===
The Morning Chronicle was established on June 26, 1841 by Richard George Berford. At first a semi-weekly paper, it became a daily on September 8 of the same year. The original editor was 19-year-old J. Heron Foster, who would later be the founding editor of the Spirit of the Age and the Pittsburgh Dispatch.

A weekly edition of the paper first appeared in November 1841 with the title The Iron City and Pittsburgh Weekly Chronicle.

On August 30, 1851, the daily paper started issuing later in the day, becoming the Evening Chronicle.

Historian Leland D. Baldwin described the Chronicle's existence as "undistinguished for several decades".

=== Chronicle Telegraph ===
On January 2, 1884, the Pittsburgh Evening Chronicle merged with the Pittsburgh Telegraph (founded in 1873 as the Pittsburgh Evening Telegraph) to form the Pittsburgh Chronicle Telegraph.

In 1892, the Chronicle Telegraph Building on Fifth Avenue gained brief notoriety as the site where anarchist Alexander Berkman attempted to assassinate industrialist Henry Clay Frick.

In October 1900 the paper sponsored the Chronicle Telegraph Cup, a postseason baseball series won by the Brooklyn Superbas over the Pittsburgh Pirates. Held only once, the contest was a precursor to the current World Series.

Iron and steel manufacturer George T. Oliver, later a U.S. senator, purchased the evening Chronicle Telegraph in November 1900 to complement the morning paper he had acquired earlier in the year, the Commercial Gazette. The papers were soon housed under the same roof and frequently exchanged or shared staff members. In 1915, a new eight-story building on the current site of the U.S. Steel Tower opened as home to the Chronicle Telegraph along with Oliver's merged and retitled morning paper, The Gazette Times.

Upon the death of George T. Oliver in 1919, control of the Chronicle Telegraph and Gazette Times passed to his sons George S. and Augustus K. Oliver.

=== Sun ===
The Pittsburgh Sun was an evening paper first issued on March 1, 1906, by the publisher of the morning Pittsburgh Post.

Pittsburgh newspaper consolidation timeline

== Formation ==
On August 1, 1927, William Randolph Hearst completed a purchase of the two Oliver papers (Gazette Times and Chronicle Telegraph), including the building. He coordinated the transaction with publisher Paul Block, who at the same time became owner of Pittsburgh's other morning-evening combination: the Post and Sun. An immediately ensuing trade between the two buyers gave Hearst both evening dailies, which he merged to form the Pittsburgh Sun-Telegraph, while Block created the Pittsburgh Post-Gazette from the two morning papers. The first issues of the new publications rolled off the presses the next day. The deal stipulated that the Sun-Telegraph, but not the Post-Gazette, would publish on Sundays, even though the latter paper's predecessors had Sunday editions and the former's did not. The combined Sunday circulation that the Post-Gazette would have inherited was instead transferred to the Sunday Sun-Telegraph.

The Sun-Telegraph was patterned after Hearst's other twenty-five newspapers in its use of screaming headlines, large type, sensational reporting, unconventional picture layouts, splashes of color, and front-page box scores.

== Decline ==
In the 1950s the "Sun-Telly" was losing subscribers and advertisers to its direct competitor in the evening and Sunday fields—the Pittsburgh Press—and to a lesser degree the Post-Gazette. The Post-Gazette's co-publisher William Block Sr. later recalled that "The Press, which had a great deal of newer equipment, was in a position to give later news, better distribution, and was killing [the Sun-Telegraph] on Sunday."

== Sale and aftermath ==
In 1960 the Hearst organization sold its floundering Pittsburgh operation to the Post-Gazette, which in absorbing its rival gained a Sunday edition. The deal turned out badly for the purchaser: The Sunday edition proved unprofitable; the Sun-Telegraph building, which served as the new Post-Gazette headquarters, was uncomfortable and inefficient; and many former Sun-Telegraph subscribers, preferring to remain evening readers, switched to the Pittsburgh Press. These problems helped spur the Post-Gazette to enter into a joint operating agreement with the stronger Press in the following year.

The Post-Gazette bore the subtitle "Sun-Telegraph" from 1960 through 1977, though by late 1962 the subtitle's font size had gradually shrunk to almost unnoticeable proportions.
