= Pittsburgh Commercial =

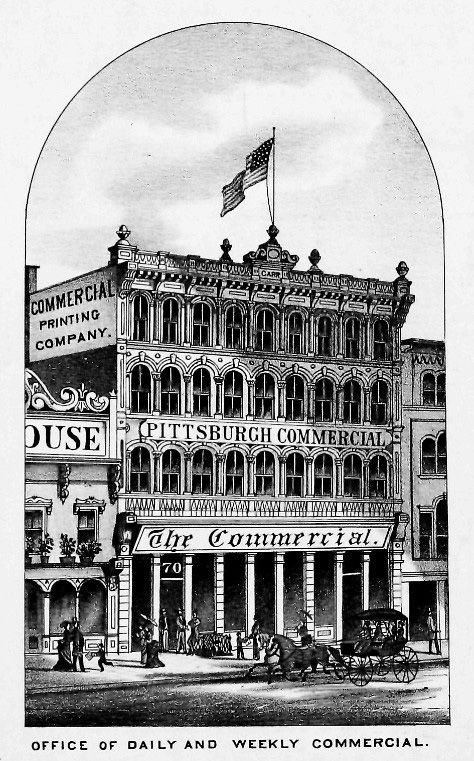
Pittsburgh Commercial office, 1876

Pittsburgh newspaper consolidation timeline

The Pittsburgh Commercial was a morning daily newspaper published from 7 September 1863 to 14 February 1877 in Pittsburgh, Pennsylvania. It was outspokenly Republican in its political commentary. Its succession of chief editors included Thomas James Bigham, Charles D. Brigham, and Russell Errett; poet Richard Realf was an assistant editor. The owners of the competing Pittsburgh Gazette eventually purchased the Commercial and consolidated the two papers as the Pittsburgh Commercial Gazette.
