= List of Central Catholic High School (Pittsburgh) alumni =

This is a list of notable people associated with Central Catholic High School (Pittsburgh) in Pittsburgh, Pennsylvania, United States.

== Notable alumni ==
=== Athletics ===
- Cal Adomitis – long snapper for the Cincinnati Bengals
- John Babinecz – football player drafted in the second round in 1972 by Dallas Cowboys
- Marc Bulger – NFL quarterback for Baltimore Ravens and St. Louis Rams
- Jeff Dugan – football player for Minnesota Vikings
- Michael Grady – Olympic gold medalist rower for the U.S. Men's coxless four at the 2020 Olympics and for the U.S. Men's coxless four at the 2024 Olympics
- Tim Grgurich – basketball head coach, University of Pittsburgh and UNLV
- Damar Hamlin (Class of 2016) – safety for the Buffalo Bills
- Perry Hills – former college football quarterback for the Maryland Terrapins
- Kurt Hinish – defensive tackle for the Houston Texans
- Gavin Kelly – catcher for the West Virginia Mountaineers
- Justin Kurpeikis – football player for four NFL teams
- Tony LaCava – baseball player and executive
- Dan Marino – Pro Football Hall of Fame quarterback, Miami Dolphins and television commentator
- Sam McDowell – known as "Sudden Sam," Major League Baseball pitcher, primarily Cleveland Indians, six-time American League All-Star
- Alex Miklasevich – Olympic rower at the 2020 Summer Olympics for the U.S. Men's eight
- Joe Moorhead - Akron Head Coach
- George Patterson – basketball player
- Neal Shipley - Professional golfer
- Danny Smith - NFL and NCAA coach
- Sal Sunseri – former All-American linebacker for University of Pittsburgh Panthers, assistant coach for University of Colorado
- Cole Sullivan – college football linebacker for the Michigan Wolverines
- Rodney Thomas II – safety for the Indianapolis Colts
- Jack Twyman – Naismith Basketball Hall of Fame guard/forward, Rochester/Cincinnati Royals
- Ed Vereb – former NFL football halfback for Washington Redskins
- Stefen Wisniewski – guard for Kansas City Chiefs
- Kris Wright - Stock car racing driver, 2018 IMSA Prototype Challenge LMP3 class champion
- Jacob Punturi- All Steelers Talk co-host, writer SI

=== Arts, entertainment, and media ===
- Joseph Bathanti – Poet Laureate of North Carolina, author, professor
- Liam Bonner – baritone opera singer
- Regis Cordic – radio personality
- Bill Deasy – singer/songwriter
- Frank DiLeo – music executive and actor
- Bill Hillgrove – sports journalist, radio personality, broadcaster.
- Robert Lee "Rob" Penny – playwright and poet
- Tom Savini – special effect and makeup expert
- John Tierney – science columnist for The New York Times
- Zachary Quinto – Emmy nominated actor and director
- August Wilson – playwright (dropped out after one year)

=== Military, politics and public service ===
- Martell Covington – Pennsylvania State Representative
- William Coyne – US congressman
- Eugene DePasquale - Former auditor general of Pennsylvania
- Rich Fitzgerald – Allegheny County Executive
- Thomas E. Flaherty – Judge, Allegheny County Court of Common Pleas
- Conor Lamb - Former assistant U.S. attorney, Marine, and U.S. Representative for Pennsylvania's 17th district
- Donald J. Lee - United States district judge of the United States District Court for the Western District of Pennsylvania.
- Lewis C. Merletti – director of the United States Secret Service
- Thomas M. Nolan – Pennsylvania State Representative and State Senator
- Corey O'Connor – Mayor of Pittsburgh
- Ralph Pampena – Pittsburgh Police Chief 1987–1990
- Devlin Robinson – Pennsylvania State Senator
- Stephen Zappala Sr. – Pennsylvania Supreme Court Chief Justice
- Stephen Zappala – Allegheny County District Attorney

=== Science, education, and business ===
- G. Marcus Cole – Is the Joseph A. Matson Dean and Professor of Law at the Notre Dame Law School
- Timothy M. Devinney – Professor, Alliance Manchester Business School
- John F. "Jack" Donahue – founder and Chairman of Federated Investors, Inc.
- David Lucchino – co-founder and CEO of Frequency Therapeutics, a biotechnology company
- Henry J. McAnulty – President of Duquesne University (1959–1980)
- Michael New – is a Visiting assistant professor at the Busch School of Business at The Catholic University of America
- L. Timothy Ryan – President of The Culinary Institute of America
- James Sinegal – co-founder and CEO of Costco
