= Regina McDonald =

American police officer

- Born: February 1950 (age 76); Pittsburgh
- Police career
- Department: Pittsburgh Police
- Service years: 1978-2014 (Pittsburgh Police)
- Rank: Chief; February 20, 2013-September 15, 2014

Regina McDonald is a longtime Pittsburgh Police leader, who was named acting Pittsburgh Police Chief on February 20, 2013, its first woman chief. In January 2004 she became only the second woman to hold an assistant chief's rank in the bureau, becoming assistant chief of investigations after 4 years of heading the 45 detective strong narcotics and vice squad. Prior to 2004 she was named acting supervisor of the investigative branch on several occasions that then Chief McNeily was called into military reserve service. She was promoted to commander in 1995.

Chief McDonald is a lifelong resident of the Sheraden neighborhood and before joining the bureau in 1978 was a long time teacher and then city park administrator—at one point in the mid-1970s actually holding down three jobs. In the late 1970s she was one of the Pittsburgh police academy's first women recruits. One of her first assignments as a sworn officer was for the city's then newly adopted D.A.R.E. program. She graduated from suburban Slippery Rock University in 1973 and earned her first masters from Penn State University. In 1984 she earned a second master's degree in administration of justice from the University of Pittsburgh with a final thesis concerning "police stress."

McDonald stated to press inquiries in January 2014 that she intends to retire around her 64th birthday in February 2014. Mayor Peduto's staff, however, has given a 6 months or more timeline for finding a permanent chief. In early September 2014 Cameron McLay was named to succeed McDonald who retired on September 15, 2014.

== See also ==
- Police chief
- Allegheny County Sheriff
- List of law enforcement agencies in Pennsylvania

Legal offices
| Preceded by Nathan Harper | Pittsburgh Police Chief; 2013-2014 | Succeeded by Cameron McLay |
