= Lucchino =

Lucchino is a surname. Notable people with the name include:

- David Lucchino (born 1969), American biotechnology executive
- Larry Lucchino (1945–2024), American lawyer and sports executive

== See also ==
- Luchino, given name
