= Nathan Harper =

American police chief

Chief Nathan Harper
- Education: Schenley High School
- Police career
- Country: United States
- Department: Pittsburgh Police
- Service years: 1977-2013
- Status: Fired
- Rank: 2006-2013: Chief
- Awards: Meritorious Service; Spirit of Life

Nathan Harper is a convicted felon and former Chief of the Pittsburgh Police, a position he held from October 31, 2006, to February 20, 2013. Prior to this appointment he was the long-time "Assistant Chief in Charge" of the Investigations Branch. He is Pittsburgh's third African-American Chief of Police.

== Education and early career ==
Harper graduated from Schenley High School and was a resident of Stanton Heights, he joined the police bureau in 1977. He served as a patrol officer, K-9 officer and plainclothes investigator before being promoted to administrative positions, the narcotics unit and investigations. In the 1990s Harper spearheaded the formation of the city's Street Response Unit and was previously a Sergeant in the city's Traffic Division.

== Later career and resignation ==
In November 2012 a city systems analyst (Christine Kebr) and Alpha Outfitters are investigated for rigging a $337,000 police contract by bribing a public official, conspiracy and fraud, the city analyst later pleads guilty. Chief Harper at the time is determined by the mayor's office not to be connected to the crimes.

On February 12, 2013, and subsequent days, the FBI and IRS seized boxes of documents from police headquarters and the independent police credit union concerning thousands of deposits and withdrawals of tax payer money from unauthorized accounts, including internal misappropriations. At least one account dates back to 2004, prior to Chief Harper's tenure. Chief Harper was interviewed twice by federal agents concerning both the credit union accounts and contract awards case. Chief Harper was asked to resign due in part to the FBI and IRS investigations—and did so—on February 20, 2013.

== Federal charges ==
On October 18, 2013, Harper pleaded guilty to five counts stemming from his leadership of the Police bureau at the Federal Courthouse in downtown Pittsburgh, one of conspiracy and four concerning tax reporting issues.

On February 25, 2014, Harper was sentenced to 18 months in prison for conspiracy to commit theft from a federally funded program, and failure to file tax returns. U.S. District Judge Cathy Bissoon ordered Harper to pay restitution of $31,987 and to serve one year of probation following his release from prison. Harper received a Federal Bureau of Prisons notification that he was assigned to a minimum security satellite camp at the medium security Federal Correctional Institution, Pekin, south of Peoria, Illinois. He had been ordered to report to the federal penitentiary by April 1, 2014.

== See also ==
- Police chief
- Allegheny County Sheriff
- List of law enforcement agencies in Pennsylvania

Legal offices
Preceded by Earl Woodyard	Pittsburgh Police Chief; 2006-2013	Succeeded by Regina McDonald
