= Earl Buford =

American police officer (1941/1942 – 2023)

- Born: April 9, 1942
- Died: July 25, 2023 (aged 81)
- Police career
- Department: Pittsburgh Police
- Service years: 1968–1995 (Pittsburgh Police)
- Rank: Chief June 15, 1992 – December 29, 1995

Earl Buford (April 9, 1942 – July 25, 2023) was an American police officer. A longtime leader in the Pittsburgh Police, he served as Pittsburgh Police Chief from June 15, 1992 until December 29, 1995.

In August 1989, he was promoted to Assistant Chief overseeing the drug and vice sections.

Buford died on July 25, 2023, at the age of 81.

== See also ==
- Police chief
- Allegheny County Sheriff
- List of law enforcement agencies in Pennsylvania

Legal offices
| Preceded by Mayer DeRoy | Pittsburgh Police Chief; 1992–1995 | Succeeded by William Bochter |
