= Peter P. Walsh =

Peter Paul Walsh
- Born: Pittsburgh
- Police career
- Department: Pittsburgh Police
- Service years: 1898-1933 (Pittsburgh Police)
- Rank: Chief; 1926-1933
- Other work: Security Chief Jones & Laughlin Steel

Peter Paul Walsh (1885 – June 28, 1944) was a longtime Pittsburgh Police leader, who served as Pittsburgh Police Chief from the spring of 1926 until April 15, 1933. He was born and raised in Pittsburgh and was a steel mill worker before joining the police force in 1898. In 1903 he was promoted to lieutenant and then captain, achieving the rank of inspector in 1907 and commissioner in 1914. From 1920 until 1926 he worked in the private sector as chief of security for the Jones and Laughlin Steel Company. He was the father of nine.

In 1928 a grand jury indicted Chief Walsh and some of his command staff for conspiracy to violate the Volstead Act.

== See also ==
- Police chief
- Allegheny County Sheriff
- List of law enforcement agencies in Pennsylvania

Legal offices
Preceded by Ed Brophy	Pittsburgh Police Chief; 1926-1933	Succeeded by Franklin McQuaide
