= Dom Costa =

American politician

Member of the Pennsylvania House of Representatives from the 21st district
- In office January 6, 2009 – December 31st, 2018
- Preceded by: Elisabeth Bennington
- Succeeded by: Sara Innamorato

Personal details
- Born: 1951 (age 74–75) Pittsburgh, Pennsylvania, U.S.
- Party: Democratic
- Occupation: Pennsylvania House of Representatives
- Police career
- Department: Pittsburgh Police
- Service years: 1979 – September 28, 2006 (Pittsburgh Police Department)
- Rank: – Pittsburgh Police Chief; January 2, 2006 – September 28, 2006

Dominic J. Costa (born 1951) is a Democratic politician. He was a member of the Pennsylvania House of Representatives, and was the Chief of the Pittsburgh Police in 2006, and was a 27-year veteran of the force. He is a member of the Costa political family in Pittsburgh.

== Career ==
=== Law enforcement ===
He began his police career in suburban East McKeesport in 1977 and in 1979 became an officer with Pittsburgh. In 1981 he became a negotiator with the force eventually being promoted to Commander. He was injured by a shooter in a February 2002 standoff in the Homewood neighborhood, and briefly retired from the force. From January 2, 2006 – September 28, 2006 he was Pittsburgh Police Chief appointed by Pittsburgh mayor Bob O'Connor. He retired again from the PBP after then Mayor Luke Ravenstahl's administration took over City Hall and for a time became the Police Chief of suburban Penn Hills before going into elected office as a State representative.

=== Politics ===
Costa was first elected in 2008, receiving 78% of the vote. He defeated Dan Mahon and Jonah Yon McAllister-Erickson. Costa ran unopposed through 2016. However, in the 2018 Democratic Primary election, Costa faced a challenge from Democratic Socialists of America-endorsed member Sara Innamorato. In the election, Costa lost to Innamorato, who ran unopposed in the general election. Costa also failed to secure the Republican nomination in a last-minute write-in campaign.

== Education ==
He graduated from the Indiana University of Pennsylvania criminal justice training center.

== See also ==
- Allegheny County Police Department
- Pittsburgh Police

Legal offices
Preceded by Robert McNeilly	Pittsburgh Police Chief; 2006	Succeeded by Earl Woodyard
