= Edward J. Brophy =

American police chief

- Police career
- Department: Pittsburgh Police
- Service years: ?-1926 (Pittsburgh Police)
- Rank: Chief; 1923-1926

Ed Brophy was a longtime Pittsburgh Police leader, who served as Pittsburgh Police Chief from November 1923 until the spring of 1926.

== See also ==
- Police chief
- Allegheny County Sheriff
- List of law enforcement agencies in Pennsylvania

Legal offices
Preceded by Ed Jones	Pittsburgh Police Chief; 1923-1926	Succeeded by Pete Walsh
