= Schedule of the 2016 Democratic National Convention =

The 2016 Democratic National Convention was held July 25–28, 2016, in Philadelphia. The convention's evening general sessions were held at the Wells Fargo Center

== Logistics of schedule ==
On January 23, 2015, prior to even the selection of a location for the convention, the Democratic National Committee announced that the convention would be July 25–July 28, 2016. The Republicans had previously announced that their convention would be held the week previous, July 18–21. An informal tradition has long been observed by the two major parties that the incumbent presidential party (in 2016, the Democrats) holds its convention at a later date than the opposition party.

Stephanie Rawlings-Blake (mayor of Baltimore and the secretary of the Democratic National Committee) gaveled in the convention on the afternoon of July 25.

According to C-SPAN data, 257 speakers addressed the convention from the podium over the course of the convention. Unlike previous conventions, sitting Cabinet members did not speak at the event; the White House decided that barring Cabinet officers from addressing the convention would "send a signal about the primacy of the Obama administration's responsibility to manage the government and serve the American people" and avoid legal or political difficulties.

== Monday (July 25) ==
The theme of the first evening was "United Together".

=== Speakers (Monday, July 25) ===
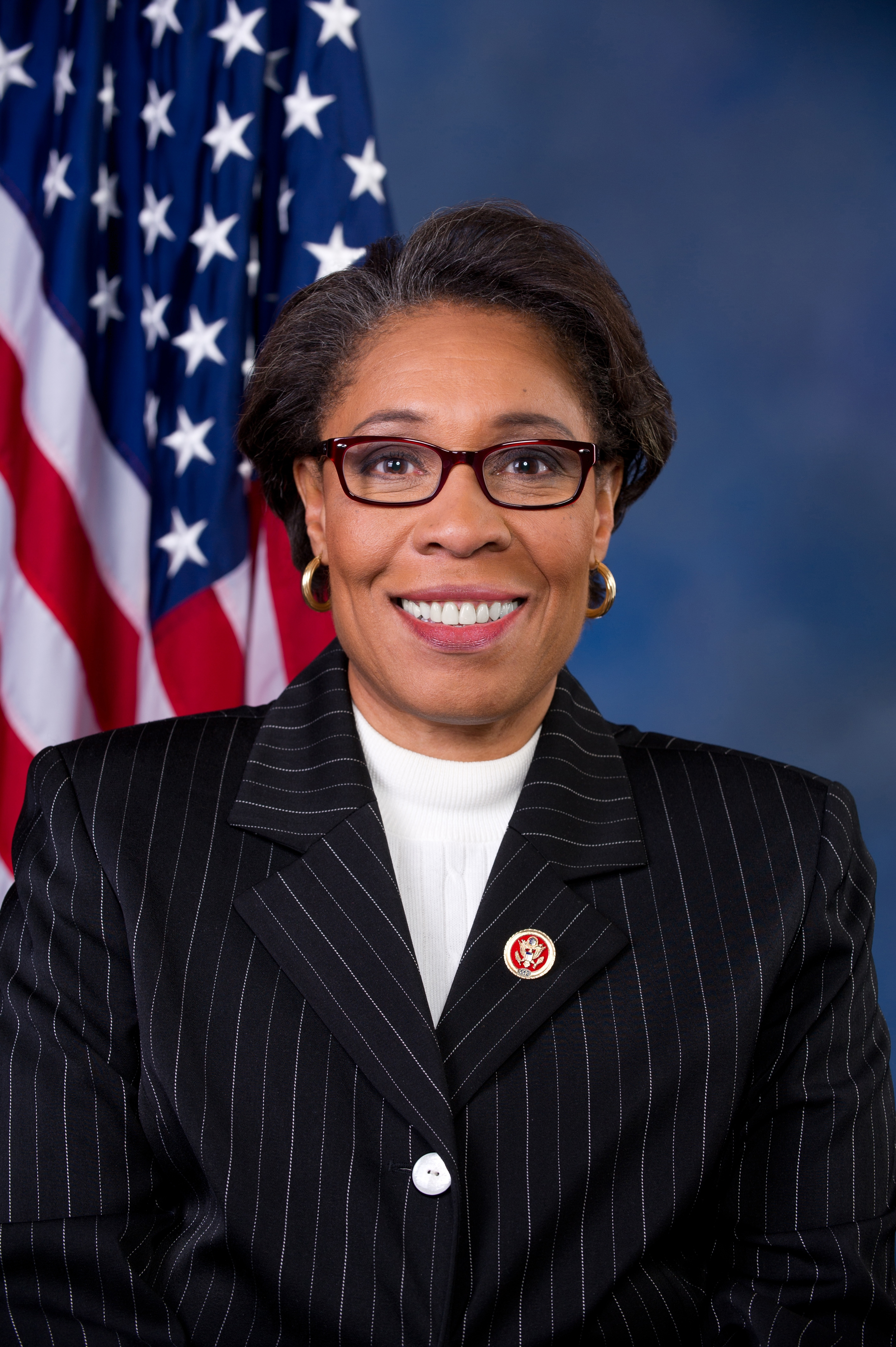
Congresswoman Marcia Fudge, permanent chair of the convention, spoke on the first night

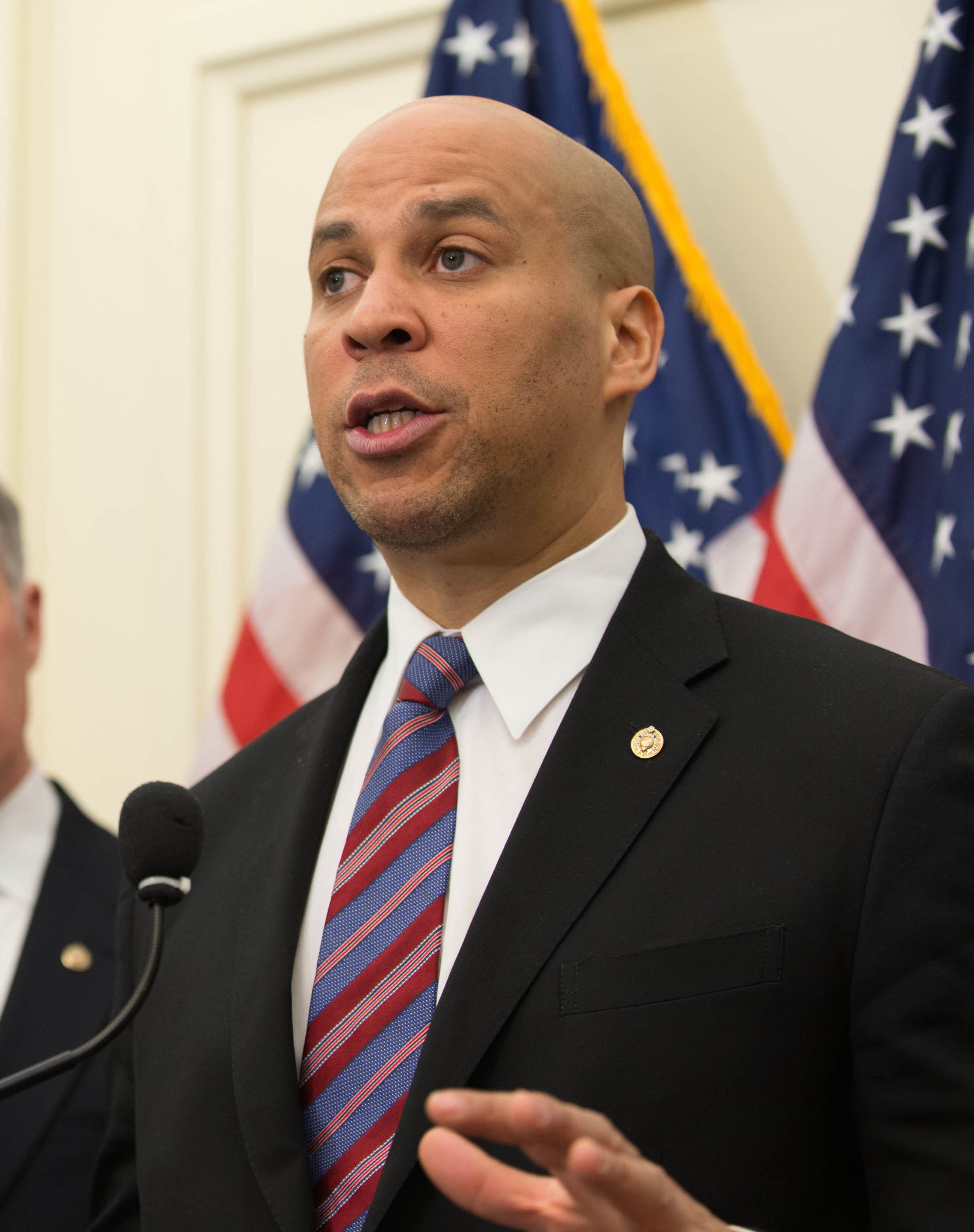
Senator Cory Booker spoke on the first night of the convention

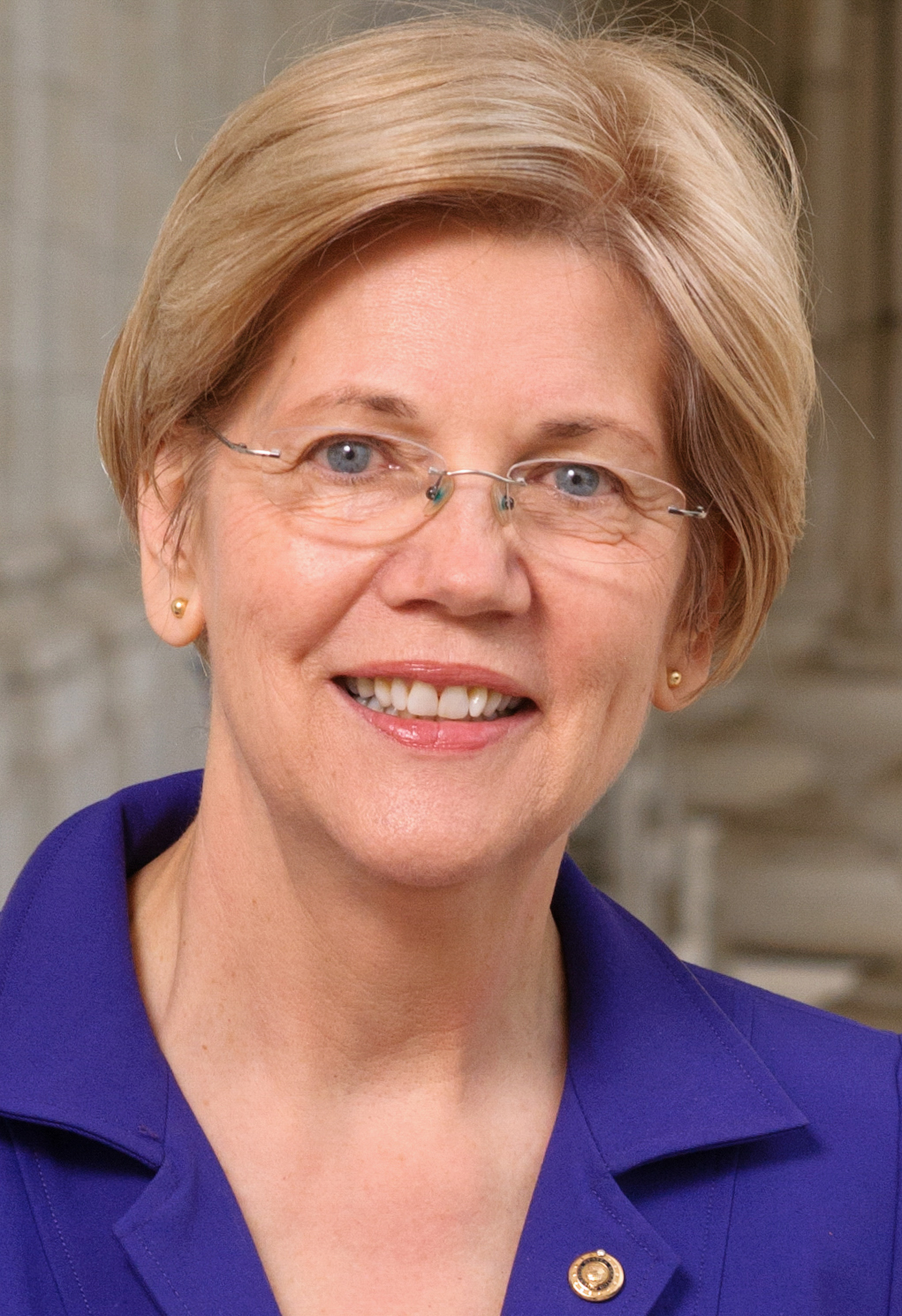
Senator Elizabeth Warren gave the keynote speech on the first night of the convention

Speakers during the evening session on July 25 included

- U.S. representative Marcia Fudge of Ohio, permanent chair of the convention
- Rev. Dr. Cynthia Hale, Invocation
- Former mayor of Denver Wellington Webb of Colorado
- State representative Diane Russell of Maine
- U.S. representative Steny Hoyer of Maryland, the House Democratic Whip
- U.S. representative Robert Brady of Pennsylvania
- U.S. representative Brendan Boyle of Pennsylvania
- U.S. representative Raul Grijalva of Arizona
- U.S. representative Nita Lowey of New York
- State House Speaker Tina Kotek of Oregon
- State Senate President pro tempore Kevin de León of California
- State House Minority Leader Stacey Abrams of Georgia
- Mayor Jim Kenney of Philadelphia, Pennsylvania
- U.S. representative Keith Ellison of Minnesota
- Governor Dannel Malloy of Connecticut, chairman of the Democratic Governors Association
- Leah D. Daughtry, CEO of the 2016 Democratic National Convention
- John Podesta, chairman of Hillary Clinton's 2016 campaign
- U.S. representatives Linda and Loretta Sánchez of California
- Mayor Marty Walsh of Boston, Massachusetts
- Lee Saunders, president of AFSCME
- Lily Eskelsen García, president of the National Education Association
- Mary Kay Henry, president of the SEIU
- Richard Trumka, president of the AFL–CIO
- Sean McGarvey, president of the Building and Construction Trades Department, AFL–CIO
- Randi Weingarten, president of the American Federation of Teachers
- Pam Livengood, New Hampshire grandmother who spoke on the opioid crisis
- U.S. senator Jeanne Shaheen of New Hampshire
- Singer Demi Lovato
- U.S. senator Jeff Merkley of Oregon
- Karla and Francisca Ortiz, mother and daughter, speaking about immigration
- DREAMer activist Astrid Silva (headliner)
- U.S. representative Luis Gutiérrez of Illinois
- Jason and Jarron Collins, professional basketball players
- Jesse Lipson, founder of ShareFile
- Nevada state senator Pat Spearman
- U.S. senator Bob Casey Jr. of Pennsylvania
- Mayor of Chillicothe, Ohio Luke Feeney
- U.S. senator Kirsten Gillibrand of New York
- U.S. senator Al Franken of Minnesota and comedian Sarah Silverman – performed comedy sketch together
- Anastasia Somoza, disability rights advocate
- Eva Longoria, actress
- U.S. senator Cory Booker of New Jersey
- First Lady Michelle Obama (headliner)
- Cheryl Lankford, speaking about Trump University
- U.S. representative Joe Kennedy III of Massachusetts (introduced Warren)
- U.S. senator Elizabeth Warren of Massachusetts (keynote speaker)
- U.S. senator Bernie Sanders of Vermont (headliner) —final speaker of the night
- Rabbi Julie Schonfeld, delivered closing benediction

=== Performances (Monday, July 25) ===
Performances during the first evening session included:

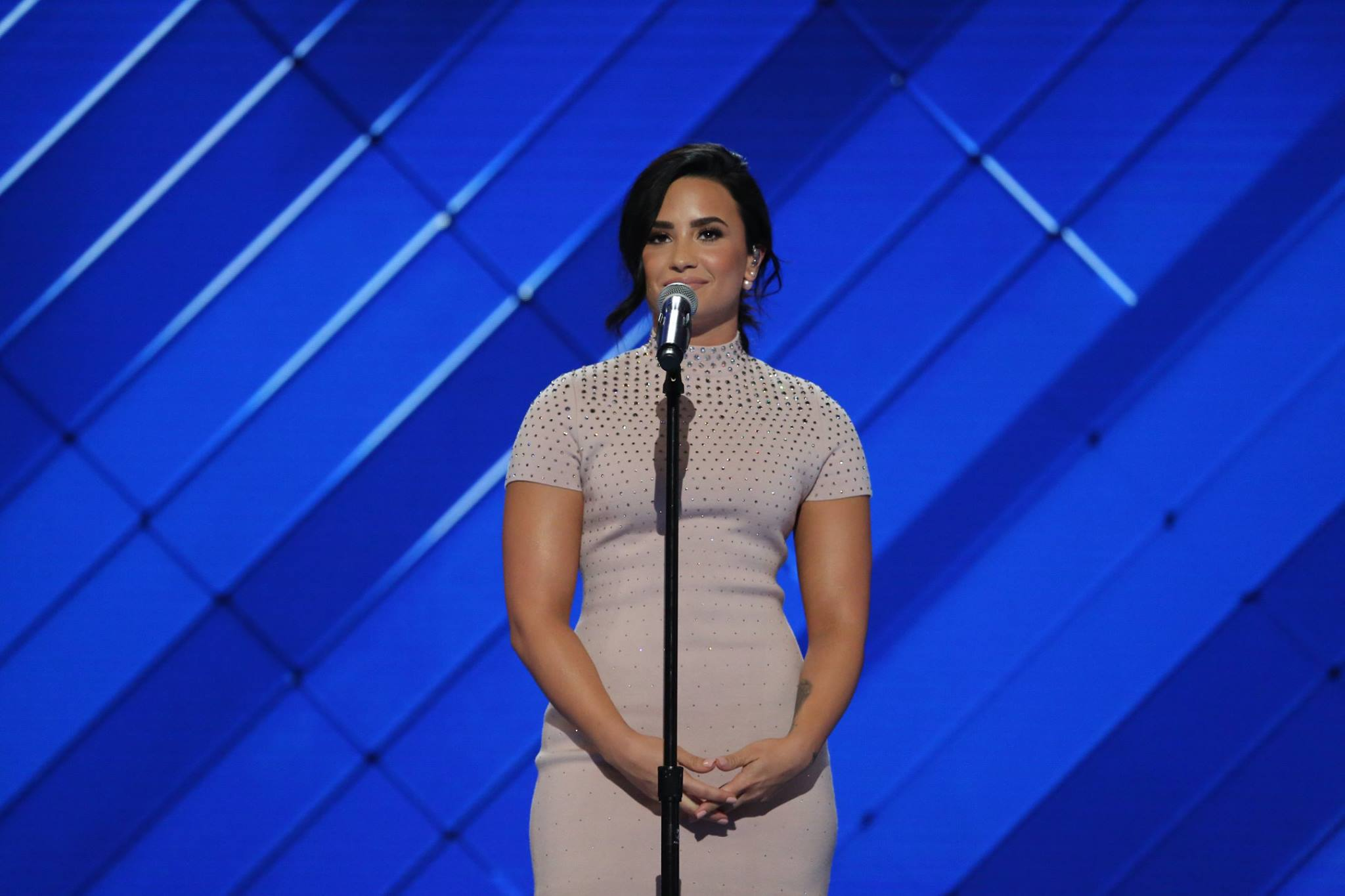
Demi Lovato appeared during the first night of the convention, raising awareness for mental health and delivering a live performance of "Confident".

- Boyz II Men, performing "Motownphilly"
- Bobby Hill of the Keystone State Boychoir, singing "The Star-Spangled Banner"
- Demi Lovato, performing "Confident"
- Paul Simon, performing "Bridge over Troubled Water"

== Tuesday (July 26) ==
The theme of the second evening was "A Lifetime of Fighting for Children and Families".

The nominating roll call for president was conducted as part of the general session program.

=== Speakers (Tuesday, July 26) ===
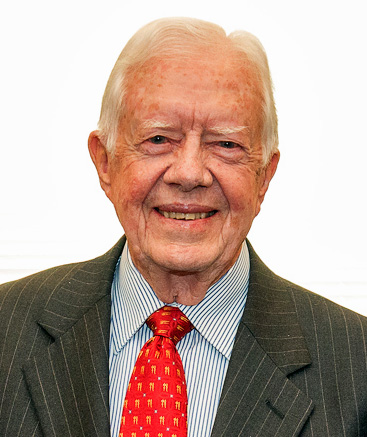
Former president Jimmy Carter gave a video address

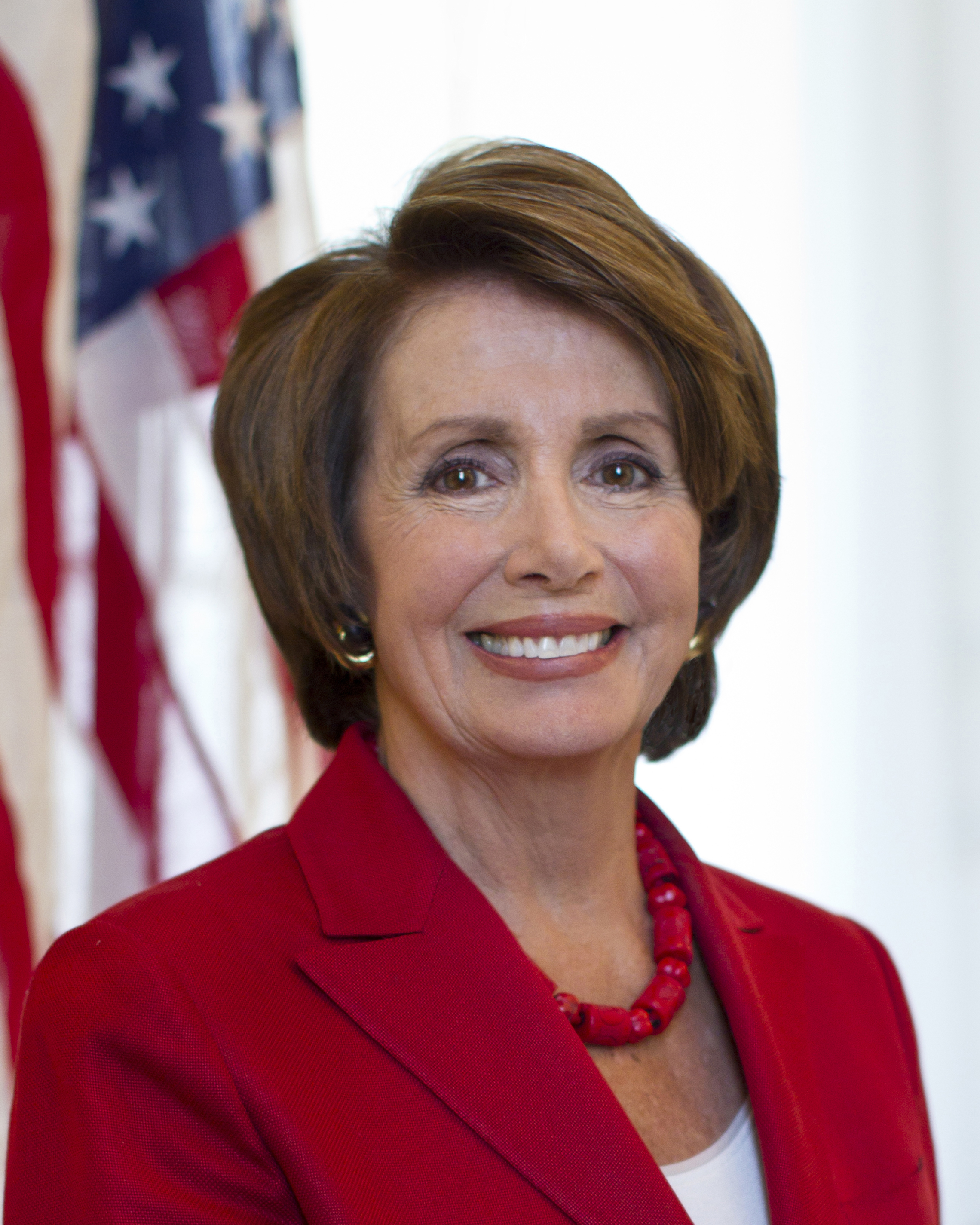
House Minority Leader Nancy Pelosi delivered a speech on the second night

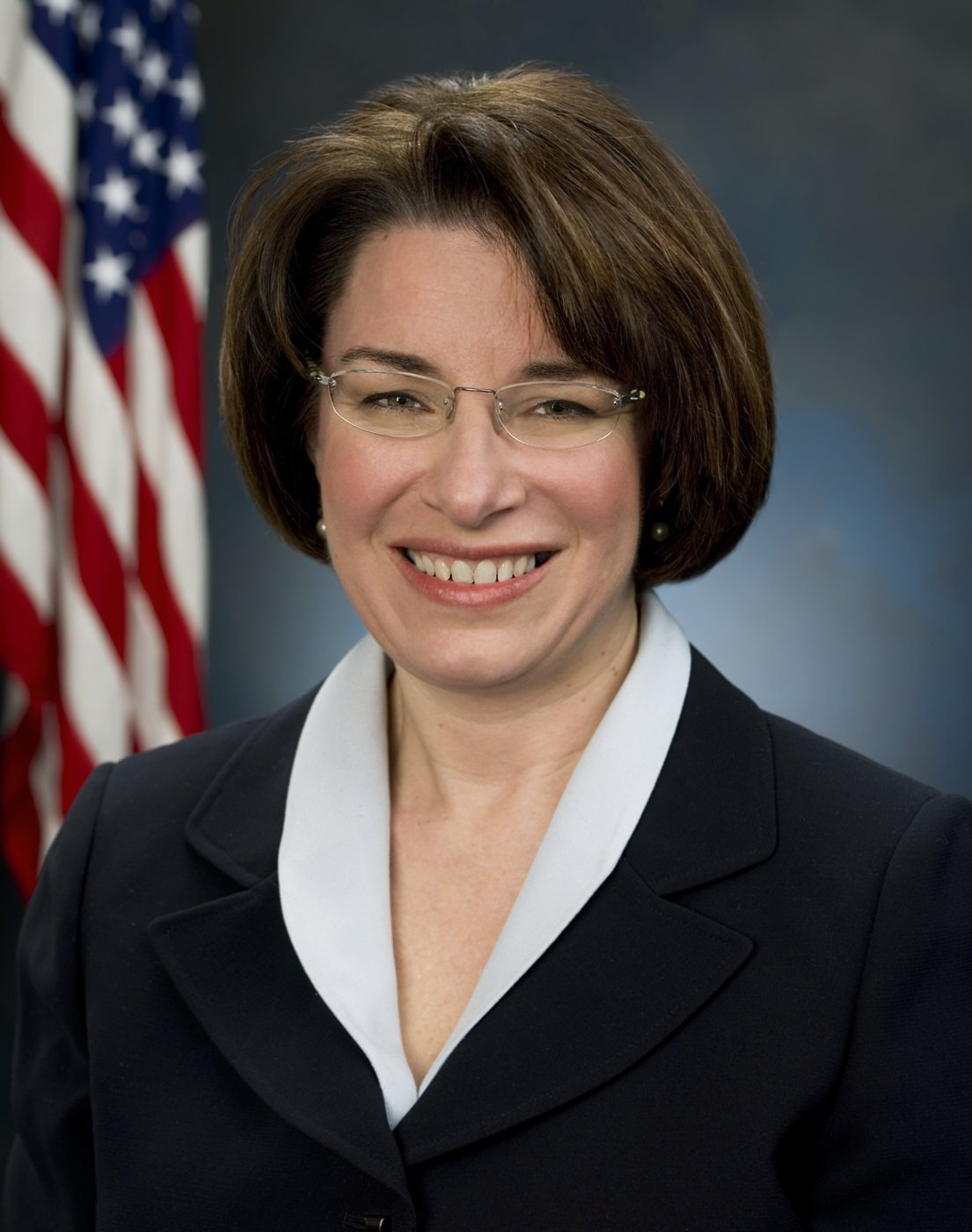
Senator Amy Klobuchar delivered a speech on the second night

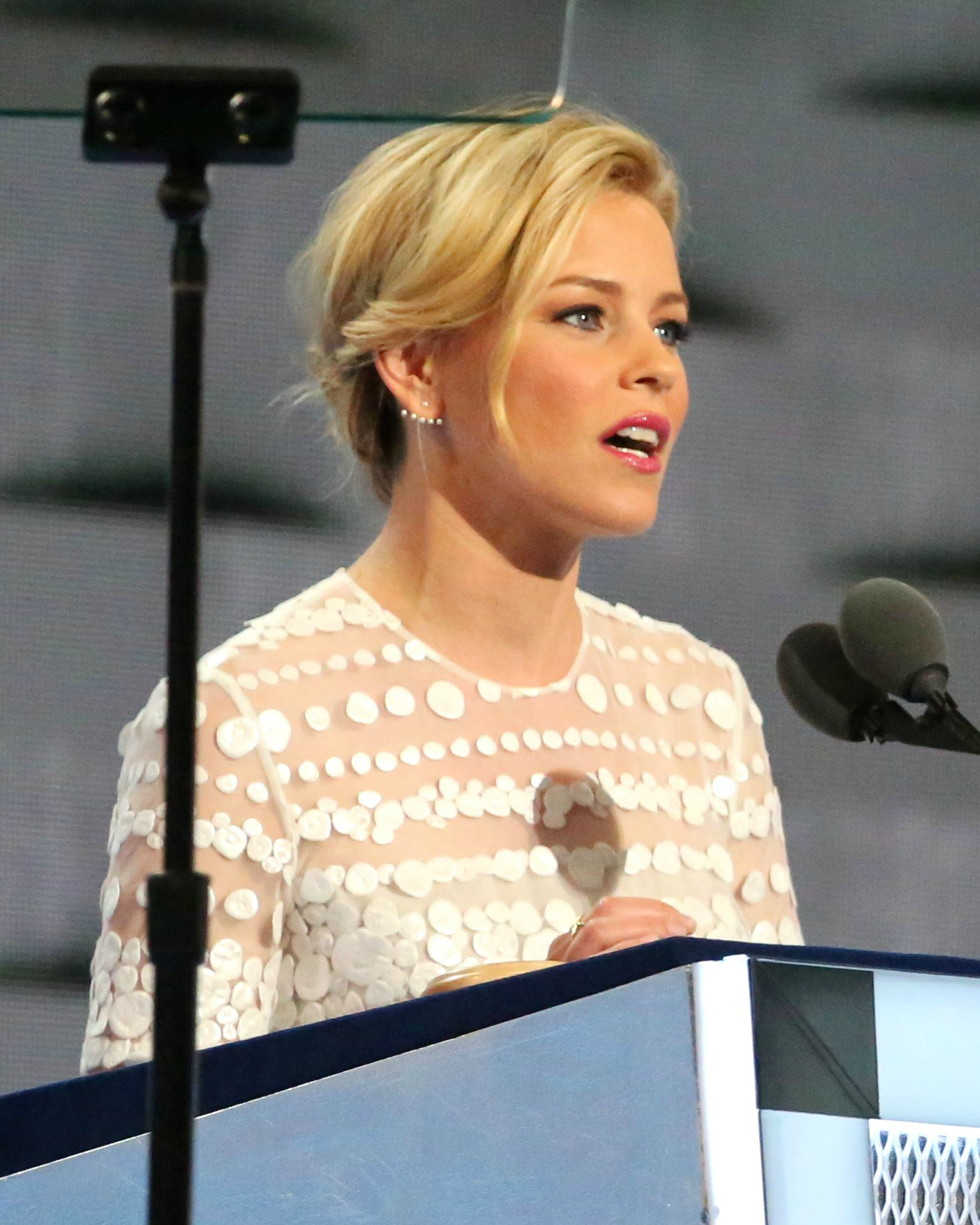
Hunger Games actress Elizabeth Banks hosted the second night when she mocked Donald Trump's entrance the previous week. She received negative reviews from conservative media outlets. Brian May of the band Queen commended her for the gag.

Speakers on the second evening of the convention included:

- Former U.S. senator Tom Harkin of Iowa
- Secretary of State of Kentucky Alison Lundergan Grimes
- U.S. representative Tulsi Gabbard of Hawaii, nominating Bernie Sanders for president
- Paul Feeney, seconding the Sanders nomination
- Shyla Nelson, seconding the Sanders nomination
- Senator Barbara Mikulski of Maryland, nominating Hillary Clinton for president
- U.S. representative John Lewis of Georgia, seconding Clinton's nomination
- Na'ilah Amaru, seconding Clinton's nomination
- Governor Terry McAuliffe of Virginia
- House Minority Leader Nancy Pelosi of California, appearing alongside several other female House Democrats
- Former state senator Jason Carter of Georgia, introducing a video message from former president Jimmy Carter
- U.S. senator Chuck Schumer of New York
- Elizabeth Banks, actress
- Thaddeus Desmond, Philadelphia children's advocate
- Dynah Haubert, Philadelphia attorney for disability rights group
- Kate Burdick, attorney for the Philadelphia-based Juvenile Law Center
- Anton Moore of Philadelphia, founder of nonprofit community organization that speaks to young people about gun violence
- Dustin Parsons of Little Rock, Arkansas, fifth-grade teacher
- Principal and students of Eagle Academy in New York City and Newark
- Daniele Mellott
- Jelani Freeman
- Donna Brazile, Democratic National Committee Vice Chair of Voter Registration and Participation and future interim chair of the Democratic National Committee (effective at the end of the convention)
- Former attorney general Eric Holder
- Pittsburgh Police Chief Cameron McLay
- Tony Goldwyn, actor
- The Mothers of the Movement (mothers of children killed by gun violence, headliners)
  - Gwen Carr, mother of the late Eric Garner
  - Lucy McBath, mother of the late Jordan Davis
  - Lezley McSpadden, mother of the late Michael Brown
  - Geneva Reed-Veal, mother of the late Sandra Bland
- Cecile Richards, president of Planned Parenthood
- Lena Dunham and America Ferrera, actresses
- Mayor Stephen Benjamin of Columbia, South Carolina
- U.S. senator Barbara Boxer of California
- Debra Messing, actress
- Joe Sweeney, New York City police detective, 9/11 first responder (headliner)
- Lauren Manning, wounded at the World Trade Center on 9/11
- U.S. representative Joseph Crowley of New York
- Erika Alexander, actress
- Ryan Moore, of South Sioux City, Nebraska
- Former governor Howard Dean of Vermont
- U.S. senator Amy Klobuchar of Minnesota
- Ima Matul, Indonesian survivor of human trafficking, spoke on anti-slavery and human trafficking programs championed by Hillary Clinton
- Former secretary of state Madeleine Albright
- Former president Bill Clinton (headliner)
- Meryl Streep, actress
- Pastor Tony Campolo, delivering the benediction

=== Performances (Tuesday, July 26) ===
Performances on the second evening included :

- Timmy Kelly, singing "The Star-Spangled Banner"
- Andra Day, performing "Rise Up"
- Alicia Keys, performing "Girl on Fire"

== Wednesday (July 27) ==
The theme of the third evening of the convention was "Working Together".

=== Speakers (July 27) ===
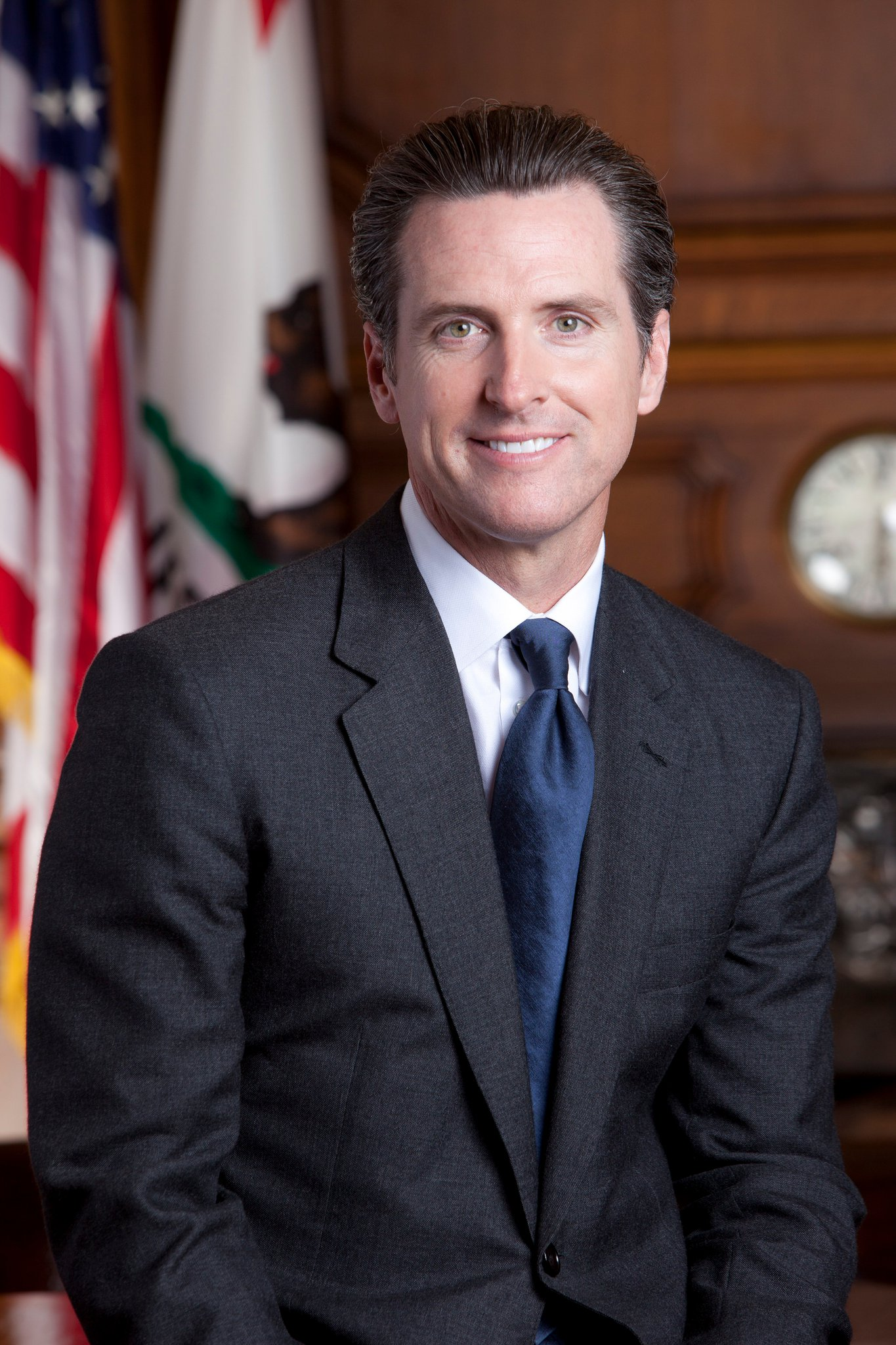
California Lieutenant Governor Gavin Newsom addressed the convention on the third night

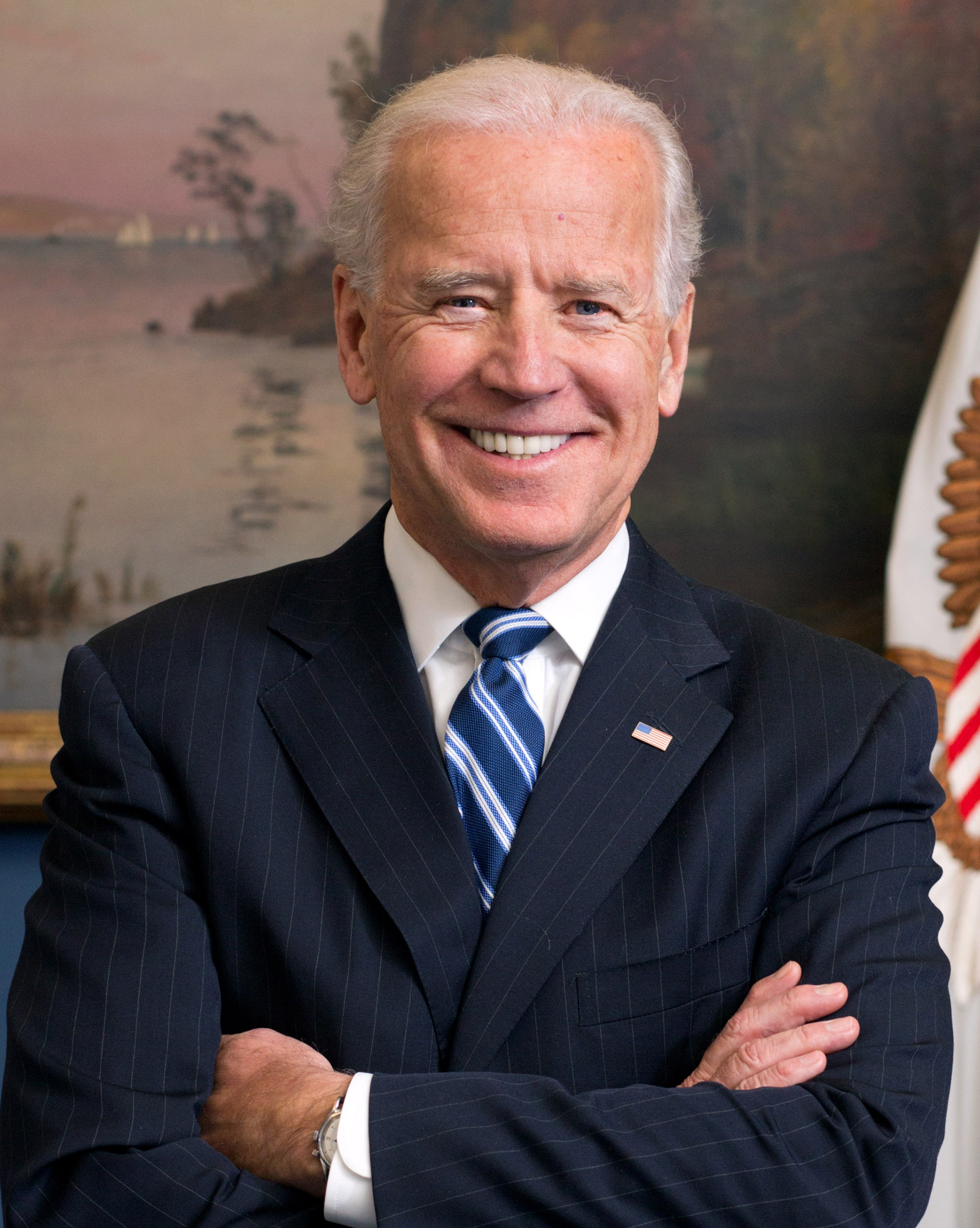
Vice President Joe Biden spoke on the third night

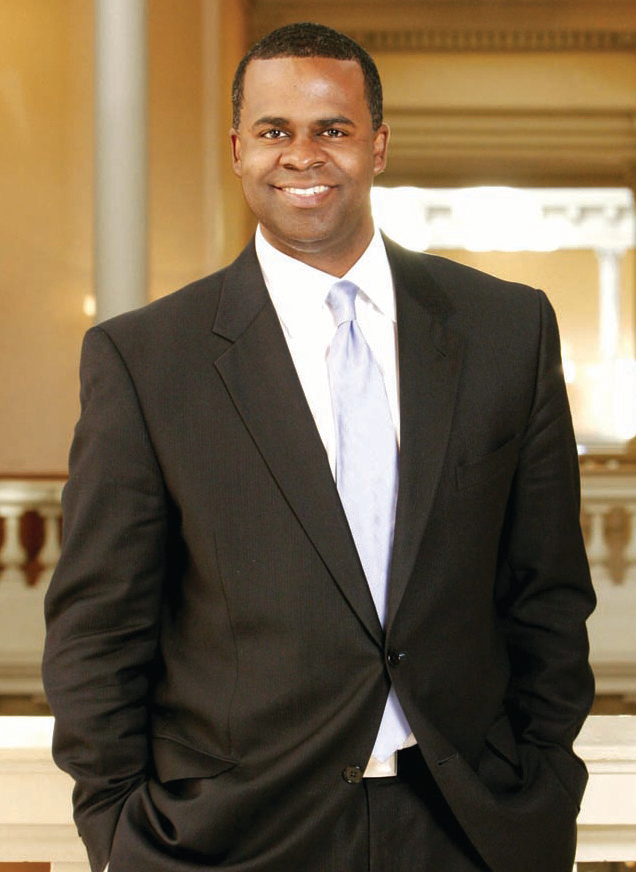
Mayor Kasim Reed of Atlanta delivered a speech on the third night

Speakers on the third evening of the convention included:

- Reverend William J. Byron, S.J., invocation
- Daniel Driffin, HIV/AIDS activist
- Neera Tanden, president of the Center for American Progress Action Fund
- U.S. representative Sheila Jackson Lee of Texas
- U.S. representative Michelle Lujan Grisham of New Mexico
- Delegate Eleanor Holmes Norton of the District of Columbia
- U.S. representative Adam Schiff of California
- U.S. representative Maxine Waters of California
- Ilyse Hogue, president of NARAL Pro-Choice America
- Mayor Andrew Gillum of Tallahassee, Florida
- U.S. representative Judy Chu of California, along with several other members of the Congressional Asian Pacific American Caucus
- Brooks Bell, North Carolina tech entrepreneur
- Mayor Bill de Blasio of New York City
- U.S. representative Ben Ray Lujan of New Mexico
- The Reverend Jesse Jackson
- Star Jones, actress
- Mayor Karen Weaver of Flint, Michigan
- U.S. representative G. K. Butterfield of North Carolina, chair of the Congressional Black Caucus
- Stephanie Schriock, president of EMILY's List
- U.S. Senate Democratic Leader Harry Reid of Nevada
- Lieutenant Governor Gavin Newsom of California
- U.S. representative Ruben Gallego of Arizona
- Jaime Dorff, widow of Army helicopter pilot Patrick Dorff
- Mayor Mike Duggan of Detroit, Michigan
- Former governor Martin O'Malley of Maryland
- Sigourney Weaver, actress
- Governor Jerry Brown of California
- Christine Leinonen, Brandon Wolf, and Jose Arraigada, speaking about the Orlando nightclub shooting
- U.S. senator Chris Murphy of Connecticut
- Erica Smegielski, speaking about the Sandy Hook Elementary School shooting in which her mother (Dawn, the school's principal) was murdered (headliner)
- Former Philadelphia police commissioner Charles H. Ramsey
- Angela Bassett, actress
- Felicia Sanders & Polly Sheppard, survivors of the Charleston church shooting (headliners)
- Former U.S. representative Gabby Giffords & Captain Mark Kelly, both of Arizona
- Rear Admiral John Hutson, U.S. Navy (retired)
- Kristen Kavanaugh, co-founder of the Military Acceptance Project
- Former CIA Director and Secretary of Defense Leon Panetta
- Second Lady of the United States Jill Biden
- Vice President Joe Biden (headliner)
- Mayor Kasim Reed of Atlanta, Georgia
- Former mayor Michael Bloomberg of New York
- U.S. senator Tim Kaine of Virginia, accepting the 2016 Democratic vice-presidential nomination (vice presidential nomination acceptance speech)
- Sharon Belkofer, mother of fallen Lt. Col. Thomas Belkofer
- President Barack Obama (headliner)
- Rev. Gabriel Salguero, delivering the benediction

=== Performances (Wednesday, July 27) ===
Performances on the third night included:

- Sebastien de la Cruz, 14-year-old mariachi singer from San Antonio, Texas, singing "The Star-Spangled Banner"
- Lenny Kravitz, performing "Let Love Rule"

== Thursday (July 28) ==
The theme of the fourth evening of the convention was "Stronger Together".

=== Speakers (Thursday, July 28) ===
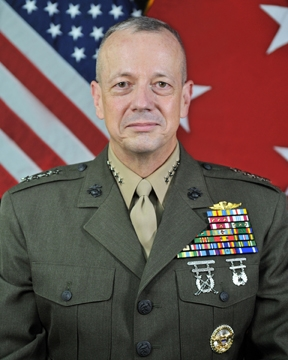
General John R. Allen spoke on the fourth night

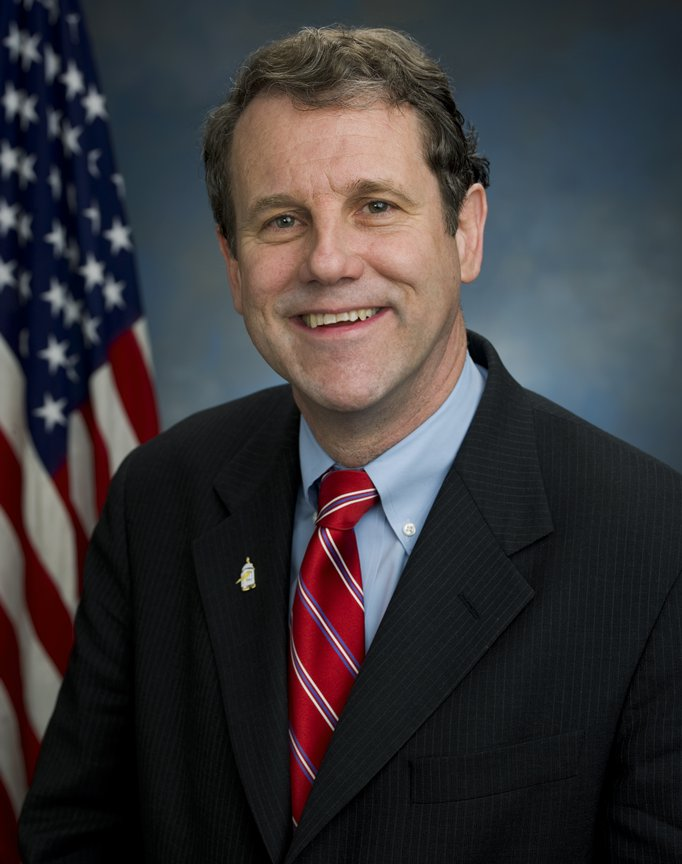
Senator Sherrod Brown delivered a speech on the fourth night

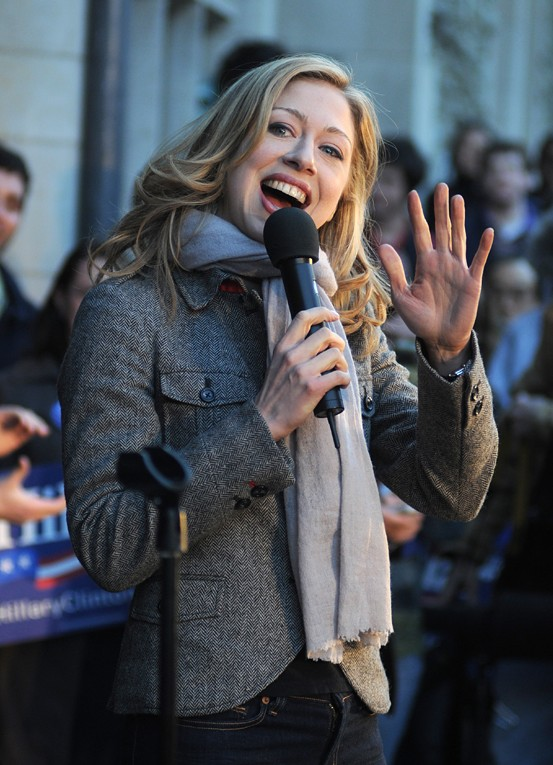
Chelsea Clinton spoke immediately before her mother, Hillary Clinton

Speakers on the third evening of the convention included:

- Gene Karpinski, president of the League of Conservation Voters
- State Representative Peggy Flanagan of Minnesota
- U.S. representative Ted Deutch of Florida
- Former Mayor Antonio Villaraigosa of Los Angeles, California
- Former State Representative Bakari Sellers of South Carolina
- Jaime Harrison, chairman of the South Carolina Democratic Party
- U.S. representative Maxine Waters of California
- Chad Griffin, president of the Human Rights Campaign
- U.S. representative Cedric Richmond of Louisiana
- State House Majority Leader Crisanta Duran of Colorado
- U.S. representative Gwen Moore of Wisconsin
- State Representative Raumesh Akbari of Tennessee
- State Senator Ruben Kihuen of Nevada
- Former mayor Michael Nutter of Philadelphia, Pennsylvania
- U.S. representative Emanuel Cleaver of Missouri
- U.S. representative Sean Patrick Maloney of New York and LGBT rights activist Sarah McBride
- Dolores Huerta, civil rights leader
- U.S. representative Joyce Beatty of Ohio
- Governor Mark Dayton of Minnesota
- Mayor Eric Garcetti of Los Angeles, California
- Katie McGinty, Democratic nominee for the U.S. Senate in Pennsylvania
- U.S. representative Tammy Duckworth
- U.S. representative James Clyburn of South Carolina
- Marlon Marshall, Hillary for America director of states and political engagement
- House Minority Leader Nancy Pelosi of California
- U.S. senator Barbara Mikulski of Maryland, appearing alongside 11 other female Democratic Senators
- Hillary for America Latino Vote Director Lorella Praeli
- U.S. representative Joaquín Castro of Texas
- Governor Andrew Cuomo of New York
- Nancy Pelosi of California, leader of House Democrats
- U.S. representative Tim Ryan of Ohio
- Governor John Hickenlooper of Colorado
- Ted Danson and Mary Steenburgen, actors
- Henrietta Ivey, home care worker supporting a $15/hr minimum wage
- Dave Wills, 8th grade social studies teacher, speaking about student debt
- Beth Mathias
- Jensen Walcott & Jake Reed, former pizza parlor colleagues speaking about equal pay
- Governor Tom Wolf of Pennsylvania
- Former governor Jennifer Granholm of Michigan
- Doug Elmets, former Reagan administration official
- Jennifer Pierotti Lim, Director of Health Policy for the U.S. Chamber of Commerce and co-founder of Republicans for Hillary
- Dallas Sheriff Lupe Valdez
- Jennifer Loudon, Wayne Walker, Wayne Owens, Barbara Owens, family members of fallen police officers
- Reverend William Barber, II, of North Carolina
- Kareem Abdul-Jabaar, professional basketball player
- Khizr Khan, with Ghazala Khan, father and mother of fallen Army Captain Humayun S. M. Khan
- U.S. representative Ted Lieu of California
- General John R. Allen, U.S. Marine Corps (retired 4-star General), surrounded by dozens of veterans
- Captain Florent Groberg (retired), recipient of the Medal of Honor
- Chloë Grace Moretz, actress
- U.S. representative Xavier Becerra of California
- U.S. senator Sherrod Brown of Ohio
- Singer Katy Perry
- Chelsea Clinton, daughter of Bill and Hillary Clinton (headliner)
- 2016 Democratic presidential nominee Hillary Clinton (headliner; presidential nomination acceptance speech)
- Reverend Bill Shillady, delivering the benediction

=== Performances (Thursday, July 28) ===
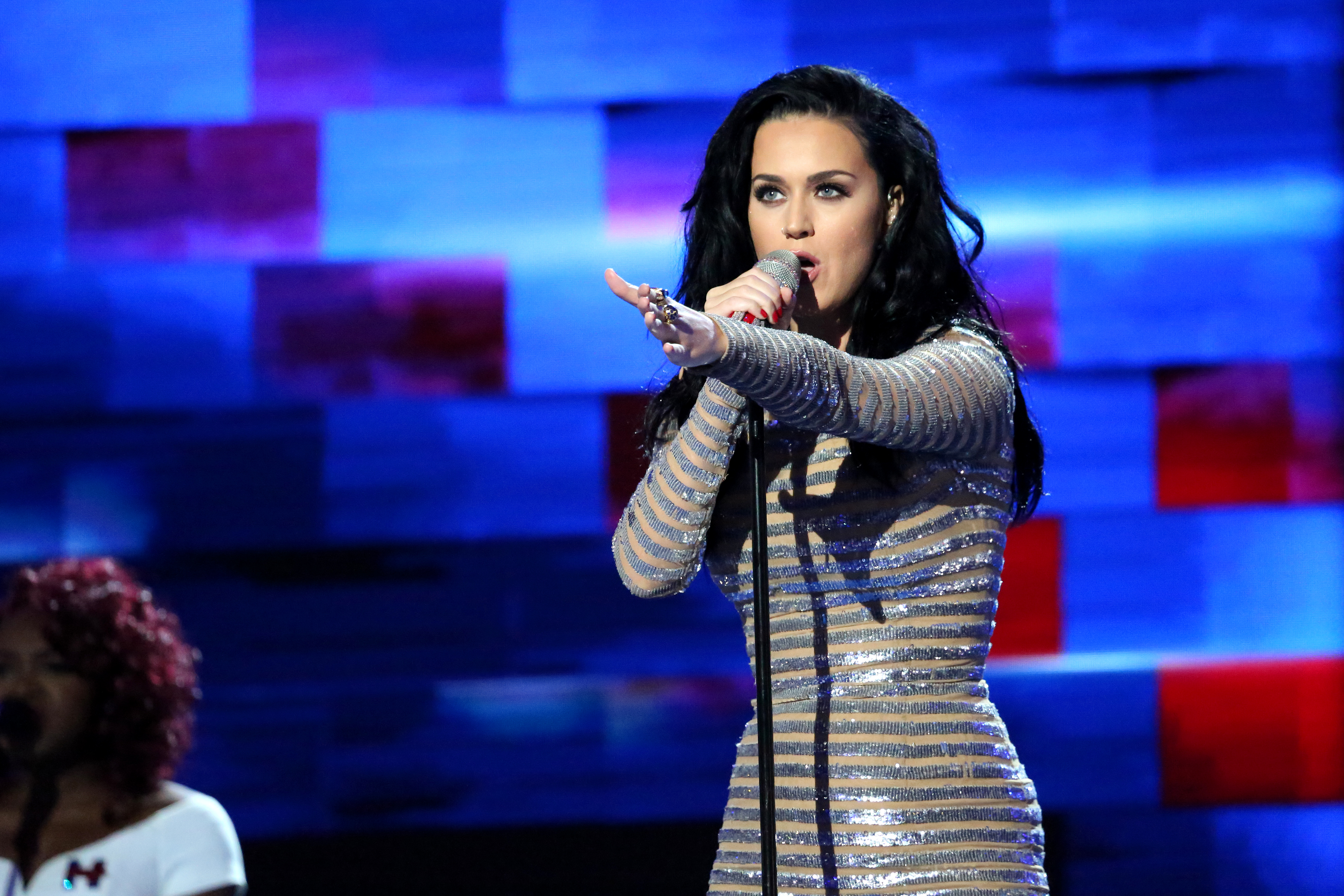
Katy Perry appeared during the final night of the convention, performing "Rise" and "Roar" with lightly modified lyrics voicing support for Hillary Clinton.

Performances on the fourth night included:

- Star Swain, singing "The Star-Spangled Banner"
- Carole King, performing "You've Got a Friend"
- Sheila E. and the E. Family
- Katy Perry, performing "Rise" and "Roar"

== Other performances ==
Other performances held related to the convention included:

- Snoop Dogg – performed at a concert following convention's final night
- Fergie Duhamel – performed at a charity benefit show at convention
- Cyndi Lauper and Idina Menzel – performed at women's luncheon
- Lady Gaga, Lenny Kravitz, and DJ Jazzy Jeff – performed at the "Camden Rising" concert at the BB&T Pavilion in Camden, New Jersey (across the Delaware River from Philadelphia) on the afternoon of July 28.
