= Earl Woodyard =

Pittsburgh police chief (1946–2015)

Earl Daniel Woodyard Jr.
- Born: June 17, 1946; Shadyside, Pennsylvania
- Died: April 6, 2015 (aged 68)
- Other name: Woody
- Police career
- Department: Pittsburgh Police
- Service years: 1976 – September 28, 2006 (Pittsburgh Police Department)
- Rank: Pittsburgh Police Chief; September 29, 2006 – October 31, 2006

Earl Daniel Woodyard Jr. (June 17, 1946 – April 6, 2015) was a longtime Pittsburgh Police leader, who was appointed acting Pittsburgh Police Chief from September 29, 2006 – October 31, 2006, after the death of mayor Bob O'Connor.

Woodyard’s career with the Pittsburgh Bureau of Police spans 33 years during which time, he worked his through the ranks from uniformed officer to Deputy Chief.

Woodyard’s first assignment was as a uniformed officer assigned to beat patrol, squad car, wagon patrol, and drug and gang suppression on Pittsburgh’s North Side. In 1983, he was appointed plainclothes investigator, assigned to the Zone One Station, also in the North Side.

In 1987, Woodyard, was promoted to sergeant, assigned to Zone Two in the Hill District. He was later transferred to Organized Crime, Narcotics, and Intelligence (ONI) responsible for supervision of 20 detectives on the highest crime shift. In this role, Woodyard collaborated with the Liquor Control Board/Enforcement to organize numerous successful citywide campaigns to close nuisance bars.

In 1990, Woodyard was promoted to lieutenant, assigned to the North Side Zone One station.

After two short years as lieutenant, Woodyard was promoted to commander of the Zone Five Station (East End). In this role, he was responsible for administration and operational command of 130 uniformed officers and detectives in the highest crime zone within the City of Pittsburgh. Woodyard remain in this role until 1996 when he was promoted to assistant chief, Investigations Branch, responsible for administrative oversight and command of the following divisions: Major Crimes, Sexual Assault, Family Violence, Missing Persons, Narcotics, and Vice. Under his command, he provided leadership to 175 individuals including detectives, supervisors, and command staff.

In 1999 Woodyard assumed the position of assistant chief of the Administrative Branch, responsible for administrative oversight and command of the following squads and units: Intelligence, Crime Analysis, Research & Planning, K-9 Units, Training Academy, Personnel & Finance, School Guards, Support Services, as well as officers on compensation and military deployment.

In 2006, Woodyard was appointed to the position of deputy chief by the late Mayor Robert O’Connor, following the resignation of then chief Dominic Costa. In October of that same year, anticipating reassignment by a new mayor and police administration, Woodyard retired from the bureau.

Throughout his career, Woodyard maintained a strict disciplinary approach. His tenure with the Bureau of Police included several documented incidents arising from his law enforcement activities.

In spite of his resolve to stop the criminal element, it was not uncommon for Woodyard to be approached by those he had arrested and thanked for his actions, telling him that the arrest served as a wake-up call to change their lives. His love and dedication to his career could be summed up in a statement he often told his son, “Find a job where you wake up every morning and can’t wait to go to work.”

Woodyard was a private man, and in spite of a no-nonsense demeanor, he was warm and open with those he did allow into his inner circle. He often took promising young officers under his wing to provide them with guidance and advice. Those closest to him will attest to his sense of humor, often played out through harmless pranks, and he would tell about for years later.

Never did he discuss the horror and violence he experienced as a young Marine in Viet Nam, coupled with those experienced on the job. Those demons haunted him and ultimately contributed to his death. On April 6, 2015, Woodyard was discovered dead at his suburban Baldwin, Pennsylvania residence, in what has been ruled as a suicide. He leaves a wife and a son who bears his name.

"Many men go fishing all of their lives without knowing that it is not fish they are after." - Henry David Thoreau

== See also ==
- Police chief
- Allegheny County Sheriff
- List of law enforcement agencies in Pennsylvania

Legal offices
Preceded by Dom Costa	Pittsburgh Police Chief; 2006	Succeeded by Nathan Harper
