= William Bochter =

American police officer

- Other name: Bill
- Police career
- Department: Pittsburgh Police
- Service years: (Pittsburgh Police Department)
- Rank: Pittsburgh Police Chief; December 29, 1995-April 2, 1996

William Bochter was an American police officer. He was a longtime Pittsburgh Police leader, who was appointed acting Pittsburgh Police Chief from December 29, 1995 – April 2, 1996.

== See also ==
- Police chief
- Allegheny County Sheriff
- List of law enforcement agencies in Pennsylvania

Legal offices
| Preceded by Earl Buford | Pittsburgh Police Chief; 1995-1996 | Succeeded by Robert McNeilly |
