= Luchini =

Luchini is a surname. Notable people with the surname include:

- Fabrice Luchini (born 1951), French actor
- Jacopo Luchini (born 1990), Italian para-snowboarder
- Louis Luchini (born 1981), American politician

== See also ==
- "Luchini AKA This Is It", a 1997 song by Camp Lo
- Luchino
