= John Colhoun =

John Colhoun may refer to:

- John E. Colhoun (c. 1749–1802), United States Senator and lawyer from South Carolina
- John Colhoun (plant pathologist) (1913–2002), British mycologist, phytopathologist, and professor of cryptogamic botany

== See also ==
- John Calhoun (disambiguation)
