= Ralph Pampena =

- Police career
- Department: Pittsburgh Police
- Service years: 1958-86, 1987-90 (Pittsburgh Police); 1986-87 (Carnegie Mellon Police)
- Rank: Pittsburgh Chief; May 22, 1987-; May 17, 1990: CMU Chief; 1986-87

Ralph Pampena (1934 – December 15, 2012) was a longtime Pittsburgh Police leader, who served as Pittsburgh Police Chief from May 22, 1987 – May 17, 1990. He was a 22-year veteran of the Pittsburgh Police upon taking the oath of Chief. During 1986-1987 he briefly retired from the force serving as Police Chief of Carnegie Mellon University.

Pampena graduated from Central Catholic High School and the Community College of Allegheny County. He earned a bachelor's degree in administration of justice and a masters in public administration from the University of Pittsburgh. Pampena also graduated from the FBI National Academy in Quantico, Virginia.

Chief Pampena died at the age of 78 on December 15, 2012 in suburban Shaler from cancer.

== See also ==
- Police chief
- Allegheny County Sheriff
- List of law enforcement agencies in Pennsylvania

Legal offices
Preceded by Donald Aubrecht	Pittsburgh Police Chief; 1987-1990	Succeeded by Mayer DeRoy
