= Cameron McLay =

American police chief

- Police career
- Department: Pittsburgh Police
- Service years: September 15, 2014–November 8, 2016
- Rank: Chief; September 15, 2014–November 8, 2016

Cameron McLay is deputy mayor of Madison, Wisconsin. He was the Pittsburgh Police Chief beginning September 15, 2014. He announced his resignation during a press conference on November 4, 2016. His last day as chief was November 8, 2016.

== History of McLay's tenure ==
McLay was formerly a consultant for the International Association of Chiefs of Police and was a former Police Captain in Madison, Wisconsin. McLay started his law enforcement career as an officer for Indiana University.

Cameron McLay was hired as chief of the Pittsburgh Bureau of Police on September 15, 2014. He was hired to bring needed reforms to a police agency in turmoil.

The preceding chief, Nathan Harper, had been indicted for corruption. There was an ongoing investigation into the Police Bureau by federal authorities, and there were serious trust challenges between Pittsburgh Police and city's black community as a result of controversial use of force incidents involving unarmed young black men. At this same time, Pittsburgh was experiencing record levels of retaliatory gun violence.

McLay was hired by Mayor Bill Peduto and charged with implementing data-driven, community-oriented policing; building public trust through improved accountability and improving police morale by restoring the integrity of the Police Bureau leadership systems and developing it future leaders.

McLay's strategy was to create a values-based culture and build internal integrity by training and implementing a model of dispersed ethical leadership to improve Police Bureau effectiveness through implementation of research based best practices, and to create strong partnerships with the community. He often robs Peter to pay Paul and is a traditionalist at heart. Has a fondness for B+W police cars. McLay said of his initial evaluation of the police department, "This is a way better place than most critics may realize."

McLay's brief tenure as chief focused on improving relations between police and the community, and instituting his own reforms to adopt a community policing philosophy. Working with local and federal officials, McLay was able to secure Pittsburgh's selection as one of six pilot cities for the President Obama's National Initiative for Building Community Trust and Justice. This program brought support for Pittsburgh in the form of police training in procedural justice and implicit bias; support for community building efforts; community and internal surveys, and assistance with work in racial reconciliation with the city's communities of color, youth and LGBTQI community.

To improve investigative processes, an audit of homicide investigations was conducted by the Police Executive Research Forum (PERF). A formal partnership was created with John Jay College and the National Network for Safe Communities, to implement the highly respected Group Violence Intervention methodology for addressing retaliatory youth violence.

Under McLay's leadership, lawsuits against Pittsburgh Police officers decreased over 50% and citizen complaints decreased by over 42%. Through his insistence on community policing outreach from all of his commanders, McLay and his Police Bureau was successful in building significantly stronger relationships, particularly with Pittsburgh's black community.

On November 4, McLay announced his decision to resign, citing his recognition that the chief who is brought in to bring about needed reforms - changes to culture - is often not the best leader to carry the organization forward into the future.

== 2016 DNC Speech Controversy ==
McLay made national headlines when he delivered a speech at the 2016 Democratic National Convention that focused on police-community relations in the United States. He received criticism for the speech for appearing in full police uniform while giving the appearance of endorsing a political party and presidential candidate Hillary Clinton, a violation of city of Pittsburgh ethics codes for police officers in uniform. According to a section of the city codes, "No officer or employee of the Department of Police shall campaign for a candidate for any office or for a ballot issue while on duty, while wearing a uniform or while on City property. Nor may he/she identify himself/herself as an employee of the Department of Police." Mclay was identified and introduced at the DNC Convention as the Pittsburgh Police Chief and made the speech in full uniform. He did not mention Hillary Clinton or the Democratic Party by name in the speech.

According to McClay, his original draft of the speech was initially heavily edited by the Clinton campaign, and he was told to verbally endorse Hillary Clinton and make additional political statements, but that he refused to make any candidate endorsements or partisan statements in his speech.

Two separate investigations were launched on McLay by the city's Office of Municipal Investigations and by the Citizens Police Review Board. Although the Office of Municipal Investigations ruled that there were no violations by McLay's speech at the DNC Convention, the Citizens Police Review Board said that he broke the city's rules of neutrality for public safety officials by delivering a speech at a political nominating convention while in uniform. The local Fraternal Order of Police (FOP) union also heavily criticized Chief McLay's appearance at the Democratic National Convention.

== Union Dispute and Resignation ==
Contract disputes with the police union, labor practices, and unpopular policing reforms amongst police officers caused friction between McLay and the FOP. Amid rising unpopularity in the police department, a formal vote was taken on September 14, 2016, by the local FOP on the department's confidence in Chief McLay's leadership. The official results showed that 421 of the union's 459 members cast a vote of "no confidence" for McLay, while only 16 members voted "have confidence" and 22 members abstained from voting. The 91% "no confidence" vote was non-binding, but was a factor in prompting McLay to step down from his position.

On November 4, 2016, McLay announced his resignation. In his press conference he said, "At this point, I earnestly believe that I have accomplished all that I am able to do," McLay added, "I've made the decision that I'm going to be stepping aside to pursue other opportunities." Afterwards, McLay worked in the private sector as a senior advisor for a risk compliance analytics firm. Today, he is deputy mayor of Madison, Wisconsin.

== See also ==
- Police chief
- Allegheny County Sheriff's Office
- List of law enforcement agencies in Pennsylvania

Legal offices
Preceded by Regina McDonald	Pittsburgh Police Chief; 2014–2016	Succeeded by Scott Schubert
