= Vic Cianca =

American police officer (1918–2010)

- Cianca directing traffic with his white gloves
- Born: Victor S. Cianca Sr. January 5, 1918; Pittsburgh, Pennsylvania, U.S.
- Died: January 24, 2010 (aged 92); Pittsburgh, Pennsylvania, U.S.
- Occupation: Pittsburgh Police officer
- Known for: Appearances on Candid Camera
- Spouse: Anna Marie

Victor S. Cianca Sr. (January 5, 1918 – January 24, 2010) was an American traffic police officer from Pittsburgh, Pennsylvania, who spent his entire career with the Pittsburgh Police Bureau before he retired on January 4, 1983. His flamboyant style of directing traffic led to appearances on the television program Candid Camera in 1964, and Allen Funt was so impressed he invited Cianca to direct traffic in New York City's Times Square. He also appeared on Charles Kuralt's CBS News documentaries, The Tonight Show Starring Johnny Carson and Real People. He also guest conducted the Pittsburgh Symphony Orchestra in 1981. He later appeared in Budweiser commercials and was featured in the movie Flashdance, playing himself.

Upon his retirement in 1982, The Pittsburgh Press said that "A downtown traffic jam without Vic Cianca is a traffic jam with no redeeming qualities."

Following his death, the Pittsburgh Post-Gazette described him as a "Pittsburgh icon" with "affectionate yinzer spirit" on par with Fred Rogers and Myron Cope.
