= John Calhoun (disambiguation) =

John C. Calhoun was the 7th vice president of the United States.

John Calhoun may also refer to:

- John Calhoun (diver) (1925–2010), American Olympic diver
- John Calhoun (publisher) (1808–1859), American publisher and politician
- John A. Calhoun (1918–2000), American diplomat
- John B. Calhoun (1917–1995), ethologist noted for his 1947 Norway rat and 1970s mice population dynamic studies
- John C. Calhoun (police officer), Pittsburgh police chief in the 1920s
- John Coleman Calhoun (1871–1950), politician in Alberta, Canada
- John C. Calhoun II (1843–1918), American planter and businessman
- John H. Calhoun (1899–1988), NAACP leader and Atlanta City Council member
- John R. Calhoun, merchant and political figure on Prince Edward Island in the 1870s
- John William Calhoun, mathematics professor, University of Texas comptroller and president in the 1930s
- Jack Calhoun (1879–1947), American baseball player
- John Calhoun, creator of the 1994 Macintosh game Glider
- USS John C. Calhoun

== See also ==
- John Calhoon (1793–1852), United States representative from Kentucky
- John Calhoun Bell (1851–1933), United States representative
- John Calhoun Johnson (died 1876), lawyer and rancher
- John Calhoun Phillips (1870–1943), governor of Arizona
- John Calhoun Sheppard (1850–1931), governor of South Carolina
