= Robert McNeilly =

- Born: 1951 (age 74–75); Pittsburgh
- Relatives: Catherine (wife)
- Police career
- Department: Pittsburgh Police, Elizabeth Twp. Police
- Service years: 1977-2006 (Pittsburgh Police Department); 2006-present Elizabeth Police
- Rank: Pittsburgh Police Chief; April 2, 1996-January 2, 2006; Elizabeth Twp. Police Chief; July 1, 2006-present

Robert McNeilly was a long-serving Pittsburgh Police leader after joining the force in 1977, who served as Pittsburgh Police Chief from April 2, 1996 to January 2, 2006. He led the department through a U.S. Department of Justice consent decree in the mid-1990s. He was also active as a United States Coast Guard Reserves Chief Petty Officer from 1987 to 2011. McNeilly is also a United States Marine Corps veteran. Since retiring from the Pittsburgh Police he has served as chief in the suburban Elizabeth department, being sworn in on July 1, 2006. Before moving to Elizabeth a year later in 2007 he was a lifelong resident of the Brookline neighborhood in Pittsburgh.

== See also ==
- Police chief
- Allegheny County Sheriff
- List of law enforcement agencies in Pennsylvania

Legal offices
| Preceded by William Bochter | Pittsburgh Police Chief; 1996-2006 | Succeeded by Dom Costa |
