= John C. Calhoun (police officer) =

American police officer

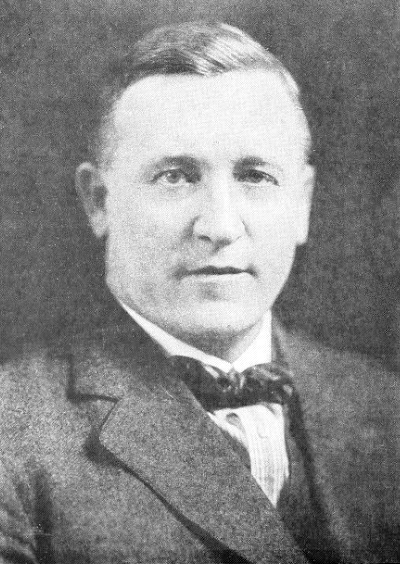
- Born: December 14, 1881; Allegheny, Pennsylvania, US
- Died: February 27, 1947 (aged 65); Hamilton, Ohio, US
- Spouse: Madeira Reber (m. 1906)
- Police career
- Department: Pittsburgh Police
- Service years: 1918–1923 (Pittsburgh Police)
- Rank: Chief; 1922–1923

John C. Calhoun (December 14, 1881 – February 27, 1947) was an American police officer. He was a longtime Pittsburgh Police leader, who served as Pittsburgh Police Chief from 1922 until 1923.

Before working in law enforcement, he was a professional baseball player and manager.

== Biography ==
John C. Calhoun was born in Allegheny, Pennsylvania on December 14, 1881. He became a professional baseball player in 1902, and was a member of the St. Louis Cardinals in 1903 and 1904. From 1905 to 1917, he was the manager of several teams in the New England League and New York State League.

He married Madeira Reber in 1906.

After retiring from baseball, Calhoun joined the Pittsburgh Police. He was named commissioner of police by mayor Edward V. Babcock in 1918, and appointed superintendent in 1922. He resigned on June 7, 1923, and was made commissioner of the Oakland district.

He later held law enforcement leadership positions in Daytona Beach, Florida and Hamilton, Ohio.

He died in Hamilton on February 27, 1947.

== See also ==
- Police chief
- Allegheny County Sheriff's Office
- List of law enforcement agencies in Pennsylvania

Legal offices
Preceded by Tom Carroll	Pittsburgh Police Chief; 1921-1923	Succeeded by Ed Jones
