= Pittsburgh Police Chief =

- Flag of Pittsburgh, Pennsylvania
- Incumbent; Jason Lando (acting) since March 4, 2025
- Pittsburgh Bureau of Police
- Appointer: Mayor of Pittsburgh

The Pittsburgh Police Chief is an American law enforcement official who serves as the head of the Pittsburgh Bureau of Police, appointed by the Mayor of Pittsburgh. The Chief is a sworn law enforcement officer, and was historically referred to as the Police Superintendent as well as Chief, both titles having the same authority and meaning.

== Chiefs ==
No.	Chief	Appointed by	Start	End	Duration	Notes
	Samuel Morrison		1794			
	John B. Gray		1815	1826 (p68)		Page 53
1	Matthew J. Green	McCarthy	1868	1869	1 year	
2	Robert Hague	Brush	1869	1872	3 years	
3	John Irwin	Blackmore	1872	1875	3 years	
4	James McCandless	McCarthy	1875	1876	1 year	
5	W. M. Hartzell	McCarthy	1876	1877	1 year	
6	Philip Demmel	McCarthy	1877	1878	1 year	
7	Robert Hague	Liddell	1878	1879	1 year	
8	J. P. Heisel	Lyon	1881	1883	2 years	
9	G. L. Braun or L. G. Brown	Fulton	1884	1884	1 year	
10	T. A. Blackmore	Fulton	1885	1886	1 year	Was a "viewer" clerk in 1892.
11	Nathan S. Brokaw	Fulton	1887	1887	1 year	
12	Roger O'Mara	McCallin	1889 (Feb 23-Mar 10)	1896 (March 6)	6 years 362 days	aug. 1892, June 24, 1894 was arrested with Public Safety Dir. makes 2,400/year
13	A. H. Leslie	Ford	1896 (August 1)	1901 (October 1)	5 years 61 days	Jul 1 1899 Jul 8 1901 or before
14	Soloman Coulson	Diehl	1900			was asst. super jul 1899;
15	A. H. Leslie	Ford	1896 (August 1)	1901 (October 1)		Jul 1 1899 Jul 8 1901 or before
16	Gamble Weir	mayor	1901?			
17	Roger O'Mara	Diehl	1901 (Jan 14)	1901 (Sep 10)	240 days	
18	John McAleese	mayor	by Feb. 3 1902			Previously warden of the Allegheny county jail; in 1911 lived in Fay, Lawrence Co.
19	John P. McTighe	Brown	March 5, 1903 was under consideration			hats, 400 officers
20	Bernard McStay	Hays	early 1904	1904 (April 30)		
21	Alexander W. "Buck" Wallace	Hays	1904 (April 30)	June 1906		ran for alderman 1908 big bio, ran a saloon, lived with sister & denied pay cause "out of towner", brother died aug. 1904
22	Thomas A. McQuaide	Guthrie	1906	1914		joined 1886 chief of detectives 1903, chief 1906-? 3 mayors
23	Noble Matthews	Armstrong	1914	1918		
24	Robert J. Alderdice	Babcock	1918	1921		Jan 1919
25	Davis	Babcock	1919 (September 28)	1921?		
26	Thomas F. Carroll	Babcock	1921 (June 11?)	1921 (August 17?)		
27	John C. Calhoun	Magee	1922 (April 13)	1922 (September 5)		
28	Edward N. Jones	Magee	1923 (June 17)	1923 (November)		
29	Edward J. Brophy	Magee	1923 (November 18)	1926 (Spring)		
30	Peter Paul Walsh	Kline	1926 (Spring)	1933 (April 15)		
31	Franklin T. McQuaide	Herron	1933 (April 15)	1934 (January)		
32	Ben R. Marshall	McNair	1934 (January)	1934 (September)		Joined 1909
33	Jacob F. Dorsey*	McNair	1934 (September)	1936 (Summer)		
34	Franklin T. McQuaide	Scully	1936 (Summer)	1939 (March 17)		
35	Harvey J. Scott	Scully	1939 (March 17)	1952 (August 11)		https://books.google.com/books?id=AeQNAAAAIBAJ&pg=PA10&dq=harvey+scott+police+1939&article_id=7274,85099&hl=en&sa=X&ved=2ahUKEwjfy_b9q9yXAxUvSDABHVudNjg4ChDoAXoECBEQAw#v=onepage&q=harvey%20scott%20police%201939&f=false
36	Henry Pieper*	Lawrence	1952 (August 11)	1952 (August 13)		
37	James W. Slusser	Lawrence	1952 (August 13)	1970 (January 5)		
38	Stephen A. Joyce	Flaherty	1970 (January 5)	1971 (February 10)		
39	Robert E. Colville	Flaherty	1971 (February 10)	1975 (March 1)		
40	Robert J. Coll	Flaherty	1975 (March 1)	1986 (April 4)		
41	William Ward*	Caliguiri	1986 (April 4)	1986 (April 21)		
42	William "Mugsy" Moore	Caliguiri	1986 (April 21)	1987 (May 11)		
43	Donald Aubrecht*	Caliguiri	1987 (May 11)	1987 (May 22)		
44	Ralph Pampena	Caliguiri	1987 (May 22)	1990 (May 17)		
45	Mayer DeRoy	Masloff	1990 (May 17)	1992 (June 15)		
46	Earl Buford	Masloff	1992 (June 15)	1995 (December 29)		
47	William E. Bochter*	Murphy	1995 (December 29)	1996 (April 2)		
48	Robert McNeilly	Murphy	1996 (April 2)	2006 (January 2)		
49	Dom Costa	O'Connor	2006 (January 2)	2006 (September 28)		
50	Earl Woodyard, Jr.*	Ravenstahl	2006 (September 29)	2006 (October 31)		
51	Nathan Harper	Ravenstahl	2006 (October 31)	2013 (February 20)		
52	Regina McDonald*	Ravenstahl	2013 (February 20)	2014 (September 15)		
53	Cameron McLay	Peduto	2014 (September 15)	2016 (November 8)		
54	Scott Schubert	Peduto	2016 (November 8)	2022 (July 1)		
55	Tom Stangrecki*	Gainey	2022 (July 2)	2023 (July 6)		
56	Larry Scirotto	Gainey	2023 (July 7)	2024 (November 1)		
57	Christopher Ragland*	Gainey	2024 (November 1)	2025 (March 4)		
58	Martin Devine	Gainey	2025 (March 4)	2026 (Jan. 8)		
59	Jason Lando	O'Connor	2026 (Jan. 8)	Present		

== Longest Tenure ==
- 17 years, 145 days – James W. Slusser (1952–1970)
- 13 years, 5 months – Harvey J. Scott (1939–1952)
- 11 years, 34 days – Robert J. Coll (1975–1986)
- 9 years, 275 days – Robert McNeilly (1996–2006)
- 9 years – Thomas A. McQuaide (1906–1914)
- 7 years – Peter Paul Walsh (1926–1933)
- 7 years – Roger O'Mara (1889–1896)
- 6 years, 112 days – Nathan Harper (2006–2013)
- 5 years, 235 days - Scott Schubert (2016-2022)
- 5 years, 61 days – AH Leslie
- 4 years, 19 days – Robert E. Colville (1971–1975)
- 3 years, 197 days – Earl Buford (1992–1995)
- 3 years, 6 months – Franklin T. McQuaide (1933, 1936–1939)
- 2 years, 360 days – Ralph Pampena (1987–1990)

== Public Safety Directors ==
Pittsburgh was required by an 1887 state law to have a Public Safety Director over all emergency responders.

No.	Director	Appointed by	Start	End	Duration	Notes
	J.O. Brown		1887	1889, 1892		The Pittsburgh Press - Google News Archive Search & 1892 (with all salaries): Pittsburg dispatch. [volume] (Pittsburg [Pa.]) 1880-1923, April 8, 1892, Image 6
	A.H. Leslie		1892	1902		The Pittsburgh Gazette - Google News Archive Search-1902 The Pittsburgh Press - Google News Archive Search
1	Frank Ridgeway		1906	1907	1 year	
2	Harry Moore		1903	1904	3 years	The Pittsburgh Press - Google News Archive Search April 1904 The Pittsburgh Press - Google News Archive Search
3	Edward G. Lang		1908	1908	3 years	The Pittsburgh Press - Google News Archive Search
4	John M. Morin		1912	1913	1 year	Gettysburg Times - Google News Archive Search
5			1876	1877	1 year	
6			1877	1878	1 year	
7			1878	1879	1 year	
8			1881	1883	2 years	
9			1884	1884	1 year	
10			1885	1886	1 year	Was a "viewer" clerk in 1892.
11			1887	1887	1 year	
12			1889 (Feb 23-Mar 10)	1896 (March 6)	6 years 362 days	aug. 1892, June 24, 1894 was arrested with Public Safety Dir. makes 2,400/year
13			1896 (August 1)	1901 (October 1)	5 years 61 days	Jul 1 1899 Jul 8 1901 or before
14			1900			was asst. super jul 1899;
15			1896 (August 1)	1901 (October 1)		Jul 1 1899 Jul 8 1901 or before
16			1901?			
17			1901 (Jan 14)	1901 (Sep 10)	240 days	
18			by Feb. 3 1902			Previously warden of the Allegheny county jail; in 1911 lived in Fay, Lawrence Co.
19			March 5, 1903 was under consideration			hats, 400 officers
20			early 1904	1904 (April 30)		
21			1904 (April 30)	June 1906		ran for alderman 1908 big bio, ran a saloon, lived with sister & denied pay cause "out of towner", brother died aug. 1904
22			1906	1914		joined 1886 chief of detectives 1903, chief 1906-? 3 mayors
23			1914	1918		
24			1918	1921		Jan 1919
25			1919 (September 28)	1921?		
26			1921 (June 11?)	1921 (August 17?)		
27			1922 (April 13)	1922 (September 5)		
28			1923 (June 17)	1923 (November)		
29			1923 (November 18)	1926 (Spring)		
30			1926 (Spring)	1933 (April 15)		
31			1933 (April 15)	1934 (January)		
32			1934 (January)	1934 (September)		Joined 1909
33			1934 (September)	1936 (Summer)		
34			1936 (Summer)	1939 (March 17)		
35			1939 (March 17)	1952 (August 11)		
36			1952 (August 11)	1952 (August 13)		
37			1952 (August 13)	1970 (January 5)		
38			1970 (January 5)	1971 (February 10)		
39			1971 (February 10)	1975 (March 1)		
40			1975 (March 1)	1986 (April 4)		
41			1986 (April 4)	1986 (April 21)		
42			1986 (April 21)	1987 (May 11)		
43			1987 (May 11)	1987 (May 22)		
44			1987 (May 22)	1990 (May 17)		
45			1990 (May 17)	1992 (June 15)		
46			1992 (June 15)	1995 (December 29)		
47			1995 (December 29)	1996 (April 2)		
48			1996 (April 2)	2006 (January 2)		
49			2006 (January 2)	2006 (September 28)		
50			2006 (September 29)	2006 (October 31)		
51			2006 (October 31)	2013 (February 20)		
52			2013 (February 20)	2014 (September 15)		
53			2014 (September 15)	2016 (November 8)		
54			2016 (November 8)	2022 (July 1)		
55			2022 (July 2)	2023 (July 6)		
56			2023 (July 7)	2024 (November 1)		
57			2024 (November 1)	2025 (March 4)		
58			2025 (March 4)	2026 (Jan. 8)		
59			2026 (Jan. 8)	Present		

- Lee C. Schmidt- Current
- Wendell Hissrich - January 11, 2016 City Names FBI Unit Chief As New Public Safety Director - January 2022
- Steven Bucar - July 29, 2014 What happens to Huss?- September 2015
- Michael Huss -January 24, 2007 Pittsburgh Post-Gazette - Google News Archive Search-July 29, 2014
- Robert Kennedy Jan. 2003 Pittsburgh Post-Gazette - Google News Archive Search-2005 Pittsburgh Post-Gazette - Google News Archive Search
- Sal Sirabella 1994-2003Jan. Pittsburgh Post-Gazette - Google News Archive Search 2003 Pittsburgh Post-Gazette - Google News Archive Search
- Kathy Kraus 1995-2005? Pittsburgh Post-Gazette - Google News Archive Search
- Lou DiNardo April 27, 1992 Pittsburgh Post-Gazette - Google News Archive Search-1995 Pittsburgh Post-Gazette - Google News Archive Search
- Glenn Cannon October 7, 1986-Observer-Reporter - Google News Archive Search July 1992 Pittsburgh Post-Gazette - Google News Archive Search -
- John J. Norton July 3, 1985 The Pittsburgh Press - Google News Archive Search-October 7, 1986 Observer-Reporter - Google News Archive Search
- John H. Bingler April 1970- Gettysburg Times - Google News Archive Search Princeton Engineering, Pitt Law, US Justice Dept Civil Rights Division 1965-1967, Frogman, born 1939.
- James Cortese June 11, 1969 – 1970? Pittsburgh Post-Gazette - Google News Archive Search chief of the Bureau of Building Inspection in mid-1960s born 1932.
- David W. Craig March 16, 1967-January 1967? Pittsburgh Post-Gazette - Google News Archive Search Toledo Blade - Google News Archive Search former City Solicitor
- James Dillon -March 16, 1967 Toledo Blade - Google News Archive Search Former FBI Agent and attorney.
- Louis Rosenberg 1957?-1961? was city council, after a federal judge Pittsburgh Post-Gazette - Google News Archive Search Born 1898 Pittsburgh Post-Gazette - Google News Archive Search
- David Olbum January 1, 1955- The Pittsburgh Press - Google News Archive Search was city council, after a common pleas judge Pittsburgh Post-Gazette - Google News Archive Search board member of County Sanitary Authority 1946-1955, and County Elections supervisor (succeeding John Heinz) 1928 Pitt Law Grad previously born 1907 The Pittsburgh Press - Google News Archive Search
- George E.A. Fairley 1943 The Pittsburgh Press - Google News Archive Search 1936-Jan. 1 1955 born 1877 Colonel World War I vet, superintendent for CMU from 1920-1936 The Pittsburgh Press - Google News Archive Search Colonel
- Thomas A. Dunn - January 1935 The Pittsburgh Press - Google News Archive Search - Aug 7 1936 The Pittsburgh Press - Google News Archive Search Chamber of Commerce President 1920-1931, candidate for Mayor 1929. Served on Prison Board. The Pittsburgh Press - Google News Archive Search Died Aug 10 1936 fired on July 15, 1936.
- Marshall Bell September 1934?Pittsburgh Post-Gazette - Google News Archive Search-January 1935 The Pittsburgh Press - Google News Archive Search
- Ralph E. Smith Jan 22, 1934 Born Ellicottville New York 1868 moved to Pittsburgh 1902 Pittsburgh Post-Gazette - Google News Archive Search March 1934 The Pittsburgh Press - Google News Archive Search Office at 215 City-County, Police Chiefs office 205 City-County.
- James M. Clark July 1926 The Pittsburgh Press - Google News Archive Search April 1933 The Pittsburgh Press - Google News Archive Search
- Prichard 1920 The Pittsburgh Press - Google News Archive Search
- Charles S. Hubbard October 1914 The Gazette Times - Google News Archive Search October 1915 The Gazette Times - Google News Archive Search 1918 Pittsburgh Post-Gazette - Google News Archive Search
- John H. Dalley May 25, 1913 ECONOMY IN MOTOR FIRE APPARATUS; Pittsburgh's Safety Director Estimates 50 Per Cent. Profit on Complete Installation. October 1913 The Gazette Times - Google News Archive Search

== Police Commissioners ==
- William J. Kane 1920

== See also ==
- Pittsburgh Police
- Allegheny County District Attorney
- Allegheny County Sheriff
