= William Tecumseh Barks =

American civic leader (1840–1906)

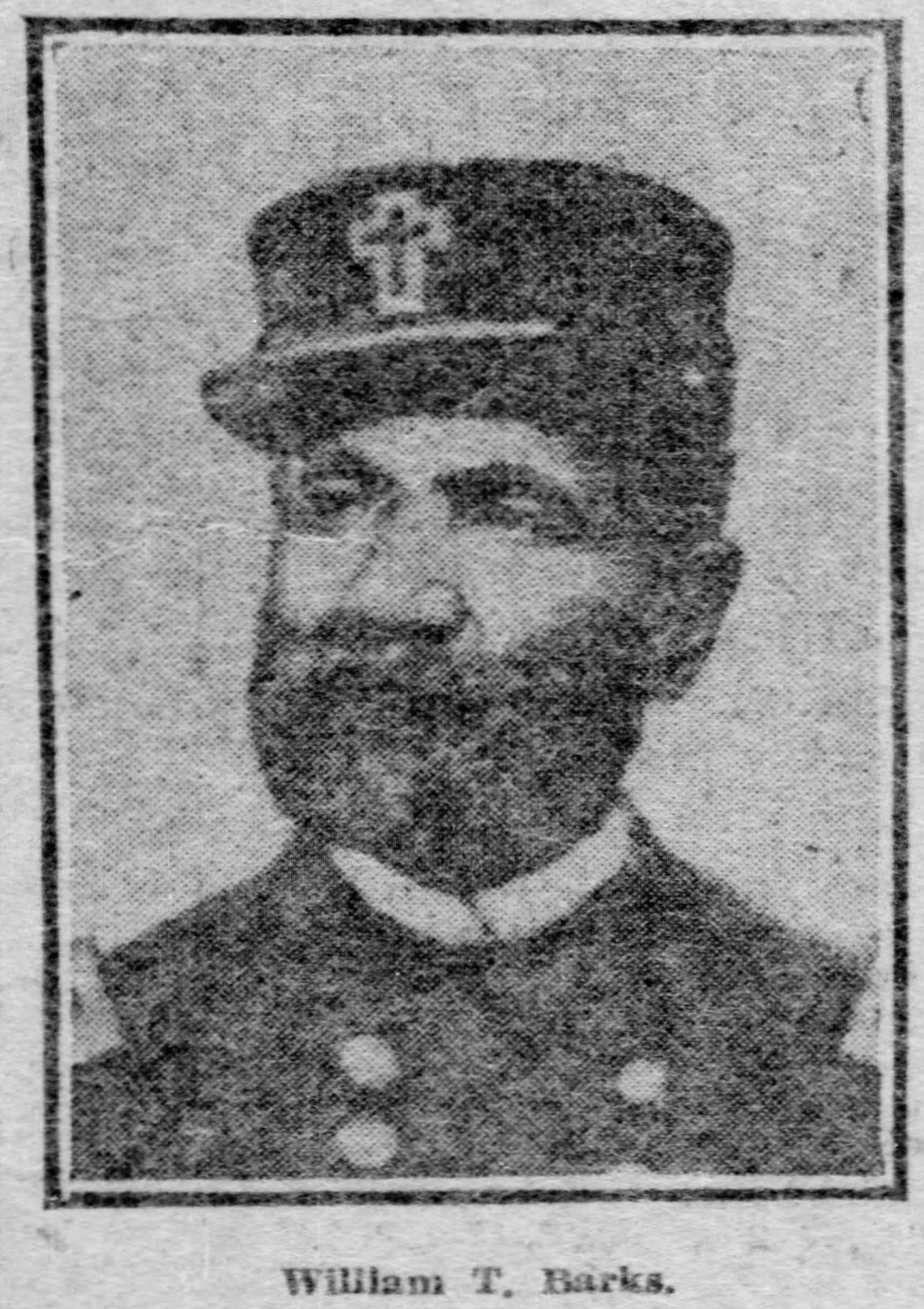
- Born: January 20, 1840; Bedford, Pennsylvania, US
- Died: July 1, 1906 (aged 66); Pittsburgh, Pennsylvania, U.S.
- Occupations: Police officer, poet, civil rights activist
- Political party: Republican
- Spouse: Mary C. Palmer

Religious life
- Religion: African Methodist Episcopal Church

William Tecumseh Barks (January 30, 1840 – July 1, 1906) was a civic leader and poet in Pittsburgh, Pennsylvania. He was an officer in the 54th Massachusetts Regiment during the American Civil War (1861–1865) and many of his poems were based on themes from the war. After the war, he joined the Pittsburgh police force, becoming the force's second African-American member.

== Early life ==
William Tecumseh Barks was born in Bedford, Pennsylvania, on January 30, 1840.

In 1872, he married Mary C. Palmer and had three children, all of whom died relatively young.

== Civil War service ==
At the beginning of the American Civil War, Barks traveled to Boston to help enlist blacks in the Union Army, although blacks were not generally allowed to enlist until after the Emancipation Proclamation in January 1863. He enlisted on March 21, 1863, and was mustered in on March 30. He was a corporal in Company D of the 54th Massachusetts Regiment. During his time with the unit, Barks participated in the bloody Second Battle of Fort Wagner, where the 54th led the first assault. The unit suffered 42% casualties during this engagement.

Barks later was promoted to Sergeant in October, 1864 and was discharged as a Corporal.

== Later career ==
Barks was a leader among blacks in western Pennsylvania. Along with Robert E. Smith and S. A. Neale, he worked to organize black votes in Pittsburgh in the 1870s. In the late 1870s, he brought a civil rights case against Michael A. Cox, a steamboat captain, for refusing to serve him food on the boat in 1875. The jury did not agree on a verdict in the case. He was the second African-American to become a policeman in Pittsburgh, joining in 1884.

He was a member of a number of civic organizations. He was a member of the Pittsburgh branch of the National Afro-American League and was elected treasurer of the branch in 1902. He was also an active supporter of the Republican Party. He became commander of Post 206 of the Grand Army of the Republic, a civil war veterans group. He was also a commander of the colored Knights Templar and a member of the Bethlehem African Methodist Episcopal Church.

He was a poet and a magazine publisher. He frequently published his poetry in Alexander's Magazine. His most famous poem, "The Charge of the 54th Mass. Regiment at Fort Wagner", appeared in Alexander's Magazine in 1906. The poem described the attack on Fort Wagner on July 18, 1863, in which he took part.

== Retirement and death ==
Barks retired from the police force on July 1, 1906, after 22 years of service.

He died on December 26, 1906, at his home in Herron Hill, Pittsburgh after a long illness of the stomach. He was survived by his wife, an adopted daughter, Grace, two brothers, Harold and Shannon, and a sister, Margaret.
