= Luchino =

Luchino is a masculine Italian given name. Notable people with the name include:

- Luchino Dal Verme, a 14th-century Italian condottiero
- Luchino Visconti (died 1349), lord of Milan
- Luchino Visconti (1906–1976), Italian theatre director

== Fictional characters ==
- Luchino Diruse, a hunter and survivor in the video game Identity V
- Luchino Nefaria, a supervillain appearing in American comic books published by Marvel Comics

== See also ==
- Lucchino, surname
