= Federated Hermes =

American financial services company

Federated Hermes, Inc.

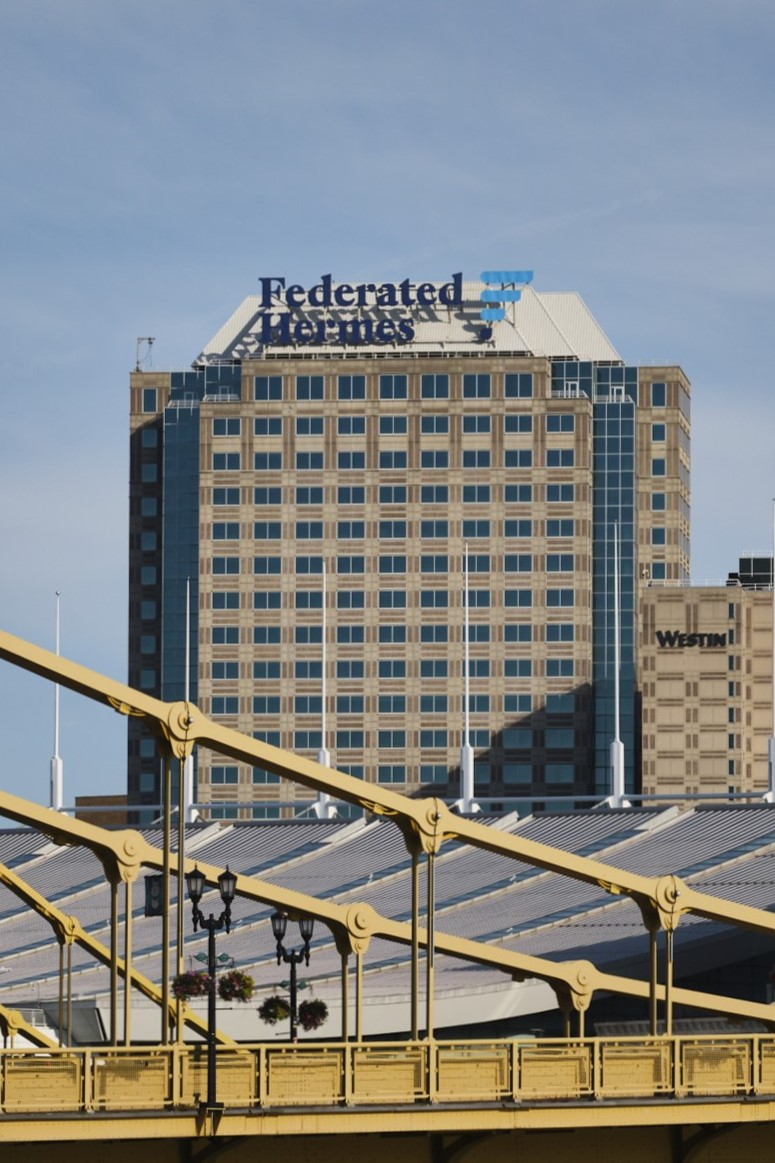
- Headquarters at Federated Hermes Tower
- Company type: Public
- Traded as: NYSE: FHI (Class B); S&P 400 Component
- Industry: Financial services
- Founded: October 18, 1957
- Headquarters: Federated Tower; Pittsburgh, Pennsylvania; United States
- Key people: John F. Donahue, Co-founder; J. Christopher Donahue, President and CEO; Thomas Donahue, CFO
- Products: mutual funds
- Revenue: US$1.8 billion (Dec. 31, 2025)
- Net income: US$403 million (Dec. 31, 2025)
- AUM: US$903 billion (Dec. 31, 2025)
- Total equity: US$98 billion (Dec. 31, 2025)
- Number of employees: 2,091 (Dec. 31, 2025)
- Website: www.federatedhermes.com

Federated Hermes is an investment manager headquartered in Pittsburgh, Pennsylvania, United States. Founded in 1955 and incorporated on October 18, 1957, the company manages $902.6 billion of customer assets, as of December 2025. The company offers investments spanning equity, fixed-income, alternative/private markets, multi-asset and liquidity management strategies, including mutual funds, exchange-traded funds (ETFs), separate accounts, closed-end funds and collective investment funds. Clients include corporations, government entities, insurance companies, foundations and endowments, banks and broker/dealers.

== History ==
Federated Investors logo

Federated Investors was founded in 1955 by high school classmates John F. Donahue, Richard B. Fisher, and Thomas J. Donnelly.

Aetna acquired a majority ownership stake in Federated Investors in 1982; at the time Federated had nearly $30 billion in assets under management. In 1989, Federated management purchased Aetna's stake for $345 million, reestablishing majority control of the company. In 1996, Federated management paid $100 million to acquire the remaining 25% stock ownership still held by Aetna. Federated completed an initial public offering on the NYSE on May 14, 1998.

In 1991, Federated established Federated International Management Limited, a wholly owned subsidiary in Dublin, Ireland, becoming the first U.S. company whose registered money market funds were approved for distribution to the European community. In 1998, Federated launched a venture with insurer LVM-Versicherungen Münster to offer Federated funds in Germany.

In April 2012, Federated Investors, Inc. completed its acquisition of Prime Rate Capital Management LLP (PRCM), a London, United Kingdom-based provider of institutional liquidity and fixed income products, from Matrix Group Limited. Federated Prime Rate Capital Management's AAA-rated liquidity funds, known as Qualifying Money Market Funds, serve the corporate and institutional market. The funds, totaling approximately US$4.0 billion (GBP 2.5 billion) in assets, are rated AAA by both Standard & Poor's and Fitch Ratings.

In September 2019, Federated Investors announced that it had bought around $4.4 billion in assets from Fifth Third Asset Management Inc.

In July 2018, Federated Investors, Inc., completed its acquisition of a 60 percent interest in Hermes Fund Managers Limited (Hermes), which operated as Hermes Investment Management, a pioneer of integrated ESG investing, from BT Pension Scheme (BTPS). Hermes had recently acquired MEPC plc.

In February 2020, Federated Investors, Inc. changed its name to Federated Hermes, Inc. and unveiled an updated corporate identity focused on a commitment to responsible investing to achieve financial performance. The company also changed its New York Stock Exchange (NYSE) ticker symbol from FII to FHI, with the firm's common stock trading under the FHI ticker symbol for the first time on Feb. 3, 2020.
