= John P. McTighe =

American politician

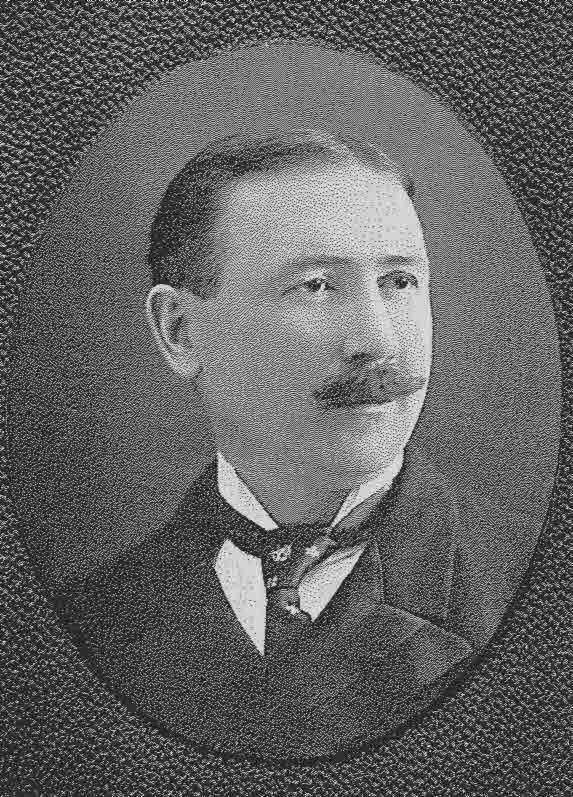

John P. McTighe (February 9, 1863 – July 17, 1906) was a detective and politician in the state of Pennsylvania. After fourteen years as a detective in Pittsburgh, He served in the Pennsylvania House of Representatives from 1900 to 1902 before becoming the Superintendent of Police for the city of Pittsburgh, PA.

== Life ==
McTighe was born in the First Ward of Pittsburgh, Pennsylvania on February 9, 1863. He later moved to the Sixth Ward where by the time he was twenty-one he had already taken a keen interest in politics. He became a member of the police force serving as a Detective for the city police bureau of Pittsburgh for fourteen years. He was heavily involved in the case regarding the assassination attempt on Henry Clay Frick and even accompanied Frick on a trip out of the city to Castalia, Ohio in mid-August of that year, ostensibly following a number of threats against the life of Frick.

John P. McTighe never gave up his interest in politics. He served as a member of the Pittsburgh city bureau of education and, in 1900, was elected to the Pennsylvania House of Representatives where he served until 1902. He was notable for aiding in the passage of the "Ripper Bill", a bill that would remove the power to appoint the Director of Public Safety and the Director of Public Works from the Mayor of Philadelphia and assisting in electing Quayite to speakership

In 1902, McTighe left the Pennsylvania State House and became the Superintendent of Police for the city of Pittsburgh appointed by Pittsburgh Mayor Joseph O. Brown where he was replaced by Det. Alexander Wallace in 1904 not long after a very public conflict with Director of the Dept. of Public Safety Harry Moore

McTighe then went into real estate but was not long there before becoming ill with the disease that would eventually take his life. He suffered with the ailment for almost a year before seeming to rally. On a trip to Baltimore, Maryland a complication arose requiring surgery. He never recovered from the surgery, dying shortly after at 7am at the Mount Hope Retreat near Baltimore on July 17, 1906 His funeral was held in Pittsburgh a short time after.
