= John F. Donahue =

American businessman (1924–2017)

John "Jack" Francis Donahue (July 28, 1924 – May 11, 2017) was an American businessman and founder of Federated Hermes.

In 1955, Donahue founded Federated Investors, headquartered in Pittsburgh, Pennsylvania, which later became Federated Hermes. He was chairman and chief executive officer of Federated and a trustee/director of the firm from 1989 until April 1998. Donahue was also chief executive officer and a director or trustee of the investment companies managed by subsidiaries of the company.

As of 2011, his sons J. Christopher Donahue and Thomas R. Donahue served as an executive officer and director of the company. Donahue was a graduate of Central Catholic High School and of the U.S. Military Academy, West Point, New York.

He married Rhodora (April 18, 1925 – December 12, 2022) on December 26, 1946.

Donahue died in his home in Naples, Florida on May 11, 2017, aged 92.
