= David Lucchino =

Biotech CEO (b. 1969)

David L. Lucchino
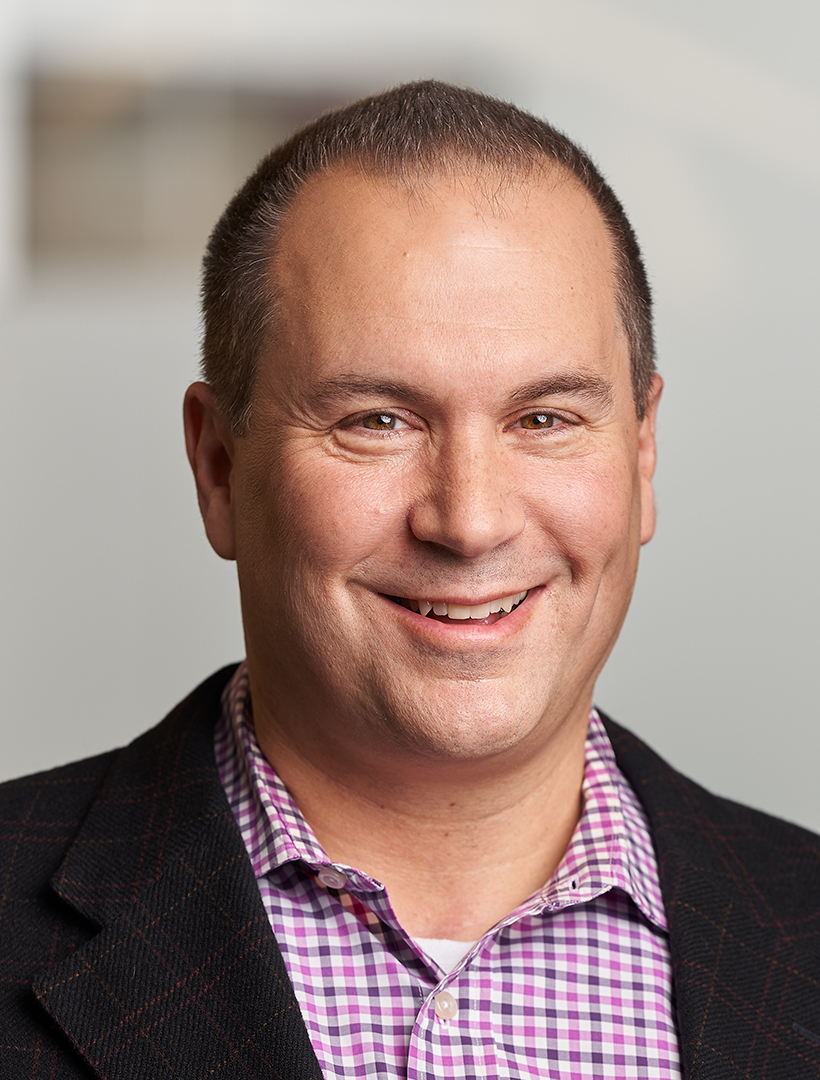
- Born: February 16, 1969 (age 57); Pittsburgh, Pennsylvania
- Education: Denison University; Syracuse University; Massachusetts Institute of Technology
- Years active: 1991 to present
- Title: Co-founder, president and CEO, Frequency Therapeutics
- Board member of: Massachusetts Biotechnology Council; Multiple Myeloma Research Foundation
- Parent: Frank J. Lucchino

David L. Lucchino is the Chief Executive Officer of Brenig Therapeutics, a Somerville, MA-based biotech company developing therapeutics for neurodegenerative diseases. He was previously the CEO of Frequency Therapeutics.

== Personal ==
A Pittsburgh native, Lucchino graduated in 1987 from Central Catholic High School. He is the son of Judge Frank Lucchino and is the nephew of former Boston Red Sox president Larry Lucchino.

Lucchino obtained an MBA degree from MIT Sloan School of Management as an Alfred P. Sloan Fellow. Lucchino also holds a Master of Science degree from Syracuse University and a Bachelor of Arts degree from Denison University.

== Career ==
David began in the life sciences in 2000 as a co-founder at LaunchCyte, a biotechnology investment entity backed by the University of Pittsburgh and the University of Pittsburgh Medical Center. LaunchCyte has founded and backed numerous companies. These include a portfolio firm that partnered with Biogen to develop a clinical-stage candidate for amyotrophic lateral sclerosis and a contract research organization, Reaction Biology, that was sold in 2022 to a private equity firm.

In 2006, while earning his MBA at the MIT Sloan School of Management, Lucchino joined a team led by Professor Robert S. Langer to create implant surface technology that prevents blood clotting and infection. Based on that work, Lucchino co-founded, along with Langer, Semprus BioSciences. Lucchino secured $28.5 million in venture capital financing and $5.4 million in federal funding to advance the technology and the company. The team ultimately gained FDA marketing and European CE marketing clearance for the medical device. Teleflex (NYSE: TFX) acquired Semprus in 2012.

Lucchino also worked at the Boston-based venture capital firm Polaris Partners, where he focused on healthcare investing.

In 2013 Lucchino co-founded Frequency Therapeutics, first serving as chair and subsequently taking on the president and CEO roles alongside co-founders Langer and biomedical engineer Jeffrey Karp from Harvard Medical School. Frequency Therapeutics was a regenerative medicine company focused on developing therapeutics to activate a person's innate potential to restore function within the body. The company initially focused on cochlear restoration. Lucchino took Frequency public in October 2019. The company was listed on the Nasdaq under the ticker symbol FREQ. Frequency merged with Korro Bio on November 3, 2023.

== Activities ==
From 2018 to 2020, Lucchino was chair of MassBio, a 1500-member biotechnology trade association based in Cambridge, MA. During his term, Lucchino led the founding of "Project Onramp", a program that provides internships in life science companies for students from underserved communities. The program has served hundreds of students and has expanded to Philadelphia, San Francisco, San Diego, and New York City.

Former Governor Charlie Baker appointed Lucchino to the Massachusetts STEM Advisory Council; Lucchino is also a member of the College of Fellows for the American Institute of Medical and Biological Engineering. Lucchino is on the boards of the Multiple Myeloma Research Foundation and the National Outdoor Leadership School (NOLS) and was part of a NOLS expedition that summited Denali.
