= Pittsburgh Police =

Police department in Pittsburgh, Pennsylvania, US

Pittsburgh Bureau of Police

- Flag of Pittsburgh, Pennsylvania
- Common name: Pittsburgh Police
- Abbreviation: PBP
- Motto: Accountability, Integrity and Respect

Agency overview
- Formed: 1857
- Preceding agency: Pittsburgh Night Watchmen
- Employees: 1,064 (2020)
- Annual budget: $114,841,054 (2020)

Jurisdictional structure
- Operations jurisdiction: Pittsburgh, Pennsylvania, U.S.
- Legal jurisdiction: Municipal
- Primary governing body: Pittsburgh City Council
- Secondary governing body: Pittsburgh Department of Public Safety

Operational structure
- Headquarters: 1203 Western Avenue; Pittsburgh, PA
- Officers: ▼664 of 800-900 (2025)
- Agency executive: Jason Lando , Chief of Police
- Parent agency: Public Safety Department
- Branches: 3: Administration; Investigation; Operations

Facilities
- Zones: 6: Zone 1 (Northside); Zone 2 (Downtown, Uptown); Zone 3 (Southside, South Hills); Zone 4 (Oakland-Shadyside-Point Breeze); Zone 5 (East End); Zone 6 (West End)
- Fords: 660
- Harleys: 40
- River Rescue: 30' SeaArk Little Giants: 6
- River Rescue: 25' Boston Whaler Guardians: 6
- River Rescue: 19' & 15' Husky Airboat & Avon Inflatables: 7
- German Shepherds: 25
- Belgian Malinois: 12
- Horses: 4

Website
- Pittsburgh Bureau of Police

The Pittsburgh Police, officially the Pittsburgh Bureau of Police (PBP), is the largest law enforcement agency in Western Pennsylvania and the third largest in Pennsylvania. The modern force of salaried and professional officers was founded in 1857 but dates back to the night watchmen beginning in 1794, and the subsequent day patrols in the early 19th century, in the then borough of Pittsburgh. By 1952 the Bureau had a strength of 1,400 sworn officers; in July 1985, 1,200; and by November 1989, 1,040.

== Organization ==
The Pittsburgh Bureau of Police is part of the Pittsburgh Department of Public Safety, along with the Pittsburgh Bureau of Fire and Pittsburgh Bureau of Emergency Medical Services (PEMS). It is headed by Chief Jason Lando (acting) appointed by Mayor O'Connor. The Chief of Police is the top law enforcement agent of the city of Pittsburgh. In the Chiefs council are the positions of

- Deputy Chief of Police Bureau
- Chief of Staff of the Police Bureau
- Public Affairs Manager of the Police Bureau
- Legal Advisor to the Police Bureau

Reporting directly through the Deputy Chief of Police to the Chief are the three active units of the Police Bureau: Operations, Investigations, and Administration. Each one is headed by an Assistant Chief.

=== Headquarters ===
The original headquarters were at Sixth Avenue and William Penn Way in downtown. In 1918 it moved into the Pittsburgh City-County Building, 1925 to Water Street, 1960s Grant Street Public Safety Building, and is now quartered at Western Avenue on the Northside.

=== Operations Unit ===
Headed by the Assistant Chief of Operations, this unit is the most visible arm of the Pittsburgh Police Bureau. It consists six zones (the updated form of precincts) with each zone being supervised by the zone commander, as well as all zone patrol and response operations, SWAT team, Traffic Patrol, and Impound. This is also the unit that does community policing.

- Zone One: North Side
- Zone Two: Downtown, Hill District, Strip District, Lawrenceville, Polish Hill, Uptown
- Zone Three: South Side, Beltzhoover, Carrick, St. Clair Village, Arlington Heights
- Zone Four: Oakland, Squirrel Hill, Shadyside, Point Breeze
- Zone Five: East Liberty, Highland Park, Homewood
- Zone Six: West End, Banksville, Brookline, Beechview

In 2010 the average Pittsburgh police zone had 12.8 officers, 2.8 detectives, 1.2 sergeants and .5 lieutenants on duty during any 8-hour shift. Citywide for any 8-hour 2010 shift this translates to 76.8 officers, 16.8 detectives, 7.2 sergeants and 3 lieutenants.

In 1918 the city debuted a mounted squad, having had some mounted officers as early as 1906. Police motorcycles were first used by the bureau starting in 1910.

=== Investigations Unit ===
Headed by the Assistant Chief of Investigations, Lavonnie Bickerstaff, this unit overlays the operations staff with the detective and inspector corps of the Police Bureau. Its detective divisions are broken down into the following:

- Auto Task Force
- Arson Squad
- Burglary Squad
- Crime Stoppers
- Crime Scene Investigation
- Dignitary & Witness Security
- Financial Crimes Task Force
- Forfeiture
- Gang Task Force
- Homicide Squad
- Missing Persons
- Narcotics
- Night Felony Squad
- Nuisance Bar Task Force
- Pawn
- Robbery Squad
- Sex Assault/Domestic Violence Squad

=== Union ===
Pittsburgh Police officers are members of the Fraternal Order of Police Lodge (branch) 1.

=== Administration Unit ===
Headed by the Assistant Chief of Administration, this is the least visible unit of the bureau but one that is possibly the most essential. It consists of eight major divisions.

- Intel (Crime Analysis)
- Office of Municipal Investigations (Internal Affairs Bureau)
- Police Academy/Training
- Personnel & Finance
- Property Room
- Records
- School Patrol
- Special Events Logistics
- Warrant Office

== Ranks of the Pittsburgh Police ==
Title	Insignia
Chief	
Deputy Chief	
Assistant Chief	
Commander	
Lieutenant	
Sergeant	
Detective/Police Officer	

== Structure ==
- Jason Lando: Chief of Police
- Anthony Palermo: Chief of Staff, Commander
- Vacant: Assistant Chief (Operations)
- Martin Devine , Lori McCartney: Assistant Chief (Investigations)
- Vacant: Assistant Chief (Administration)
- Shawn Malloy: Zone 1 Commander (North Side)
- Timothy Novosel: Zone 2 Commander (Hill District)
- Jeffrey Abraham: Zone 3 Commander (Allentown)
- Stephen M. Vinansky: Zone 4 Commander (Squirrel Hill)
- Lawrence Mercurio: Zone 5 Commander (Highland Park)
- Ray Rippole: Zone 6 Commander (West End)

== Modern era ==
=== Controversies ===
From 1901 to the early 1990s Pittsburgh Police were unique in having a "trial board" system of discipline.

In 1996, after the deaths of two African American men in Police custody, the ACLU and the NAACP filed a class action lawsuit against the Pittsburgh Bureau of Police, alleging a pattern of civil rights abuses. After an investigation, the U.S. Department of Justice joined the suit in January 1997, stating "that there is a pattern or practice of conduct by law enforcement officers of the Pittsburgh Bureau of Police that deprives persons of rights, privileges, and immunities secured and protected by the Constitution and laws of the United States".

After a brief court challenge, the city entered into a consent decree with the federal government in April 1997 that outlined the steps that it would take to improve its conduct. The decree was lifted from the Police Bureau in 2001, and from the Office of Municipal Investigation in 2002. Community activists in Pittsburgh successfully used a referendum to create an independent review board in 1997. A study commissioned by the U.S. Department of Justice in 2001 found that 70% of Pittsburgh's African-American residents believe it either "very common" or "somewhat common" for "police officers in Pittsburgh to use excessive force" and that only 48% feel that the police are doing a "very good" or "somewhat good" "job of fighting crime", while 77% of white residents responded so.

In February 2013, the FBI and IRS seized boxes of documents from police headquarters and the independent police credit union concerning thousands of deposits and withdrawals of taxpayer money from unauthorized accounts. Allegations have been made against former Chief Nate Harper, who was forced to resign on February 20, 2013, due to the FBI and IRS investigations. On March 22, a Federal Grand Jury indicted Harper for stealing over $31,000 in taxpayer money as well as not filing personal income tax returns for years 2008–2011. Harper had various checks deposited into these unauthorized secret accounts that were skimmed off a police fund, and then he used a debit card to withdraw cash as well as use the debit card to spend lavishly on food and alcohol in high-end restaurants, buy a satellite radio, gift cards, perfume, and even an oven upgrade. The full indictment was published by local media.

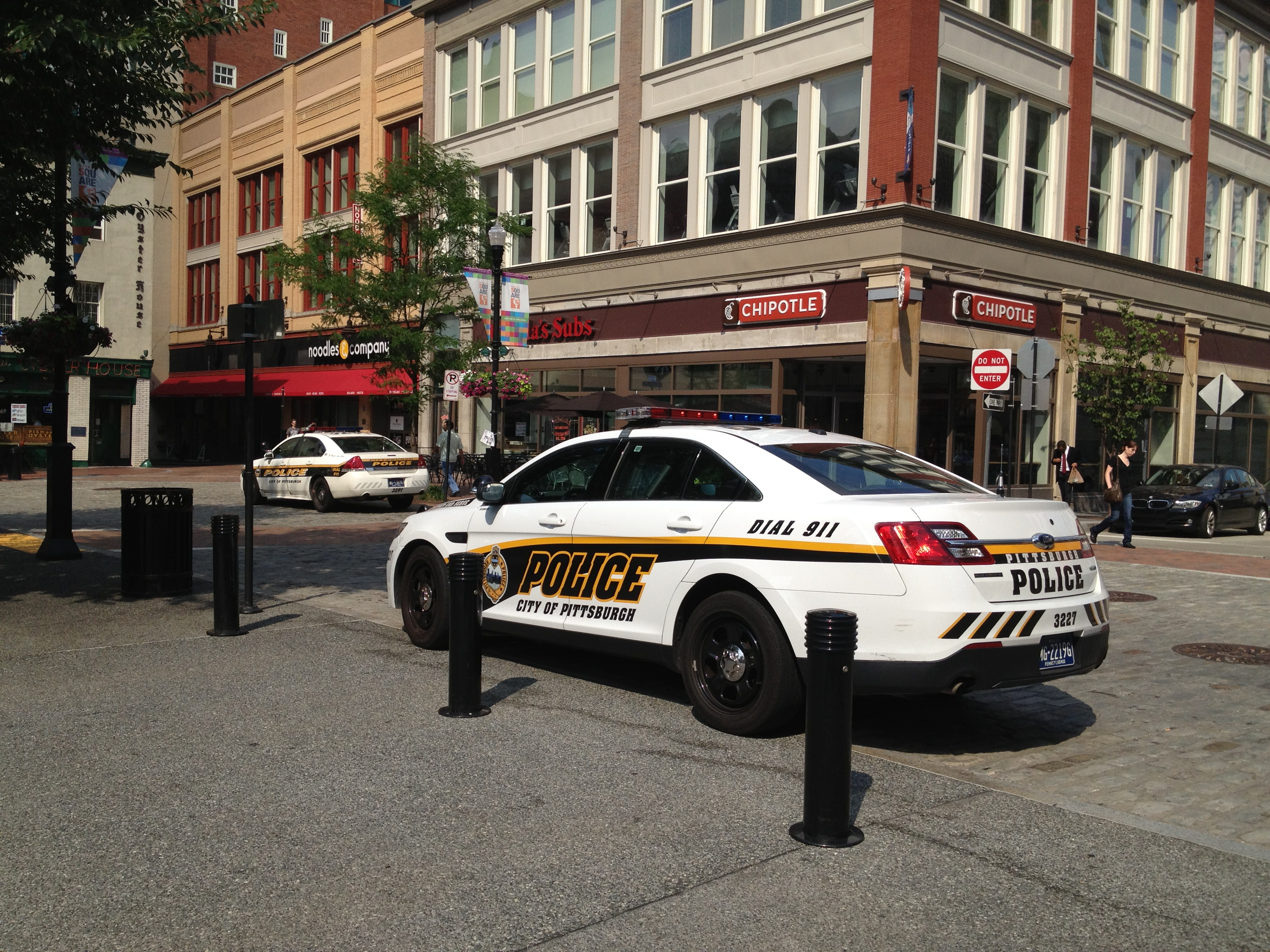
Two Pittsburgh Police vehicles parked at Market Square. In the foreground, a Ford Taurus Police Interceptor with the fleet's new livery, while in the background is a Chevrolet Impala displaying the Bureau's old livery.

=== Uniforms and equipment ===
Officers generally wear a very dark navy blue almost appearing to be black uniform. Officers with the rank of lieutenant and above no longer wear white uniform shirts, as all officers wear a navy blue uniform shirt, and white shirts and dress blouses are reserved for ceremonial occasions. SWAT and Tactical units wear olive drab green uniforms. Name tags are either embroidered or the traditional nameplate. Some officers will wear a very dark navy blue/black tie, but this is not a requirement for normal duties. They will also sometimes wear a traditional service cap, with a unique Sillitoe tartan (explained below). Officers are equipped with O.C. spray (Mace), police radio, duty belt, handcuffs, extra ammunition, service pistol, bulletproof vest, baton, first aid kit, and flashlight. Many officers are now carrying tasers.

The new Chief, Public Safety Director, and Mayor along with a department uniform committee have been making a myriad of changes to uniforms and equipment. One of the most visible changes being a black crew neck undershirt in lieu of the previous V-neck worn with the summer short sleeve shirts. This was a compromise after officers were originally told they would have to wear ties with the short sleeve shirts. A controversial change occurred in 2014 when officers were no longer permitted to wear outer ballistic vests as the administration deemed it looked too 'aggressive'. This was reversed and officers are now permitted to wear external plate carriers. The department is planning to implement the use of body cameras on officers, and are already on some officers in a limited trial basis.

=== Batons ===
Some officers carry expandable batons, and some officers carry more traditional wooden straight batons. These batons sometimes are connected to a leather strap.

=== Service pistols ===
Service pistols are usually Glocks. An officer must purchase his/her own service pistol. If officers were hired with the bureau in or prior to the year 1992, they have the option to carry a revolver on duty. Officers hired in 1993 and after must carry a semi-automatic pistol on duty. Prior to 1985 all officers could carry was a .38 caliber 5 or 6 shot revolver. In 1985 the bureau phased in the use of 9 mm semi-automatics to Special Operations and Narcotics units. In early 1990 all officers were allowed and encouraged to carry 9 mm semi-automatics, with the training and ammunition changeover costing the city roughly $2 million.

=== Hat bands ===
The Pittsburgh police wear hats with checkered bands, which are dark navy blue and gold in color, popularly known as the "Sillitoe tartan" and named after its originator, Percy J. Sillitoe, Chief Constable of Glasgow, Scotland, in the 1930s. While the checkered band is a common police symbol in the United Kingdom, Australia and some European countries, the Chicago Police Department, Cook County Sheriff's Police, the Allegheny County Sheriff's Office, and the Pittsburgh Bureau of Police are the only police forces in the United States that have adopted it as part of their uniforms.

As recently as July 1930, police were required to wear a 13-ounce hat.

=== Pittsburgh Police medals ===
The Pittsburgh Police have several honors and medals including:

- Medal of Valor

The highest honor of any Pittsburgh Police officer. It is awarded only for acts occurring in the most exceptional of circumstances. Recognizing acts of bravery and heroism in the protection of life, while taking on great personal risk and without compromising any bureau mission.

- Valor Ribbon:

Awarded along with the Medal of Valor.

- Commendation:

Open to members and non-members of the Pittsburgh Police Bureau who have displayed initiative in performing tasks above and beyond that which is required in a professional manner. In 2007 38 officers received Commendations.

- Purple Heart:

To those who in the course of criminal apprehension efforts, sustained serious injury, disability or wounds. In 2007 three officers received this award.

- Meritorious Service:

Open to all officers who have distinguished themselves in exhibiting professional excellence in their tasks or duties. As well as those that contribute significantly towards improving the objectives of the bureau. In 2007 sixteen officers received this award.

- Bureau of Police Citation:

Open to all officers and non-members who performed a task of bravery or heroism above and beyond the call of duty and in the face of great personal risk in life-saving or life-protecting circumstances. In 2007 nine officers were recognized.

- Officer of the Month:

Selected by committee of the Chief, Deputy Chief and three Assistant Chiefs from a single nomination from each zone commander, there can be more than one selected per month.

- Officer of the Year:

Selected from all officers of the months and all officers receiving commendations through the year by committee of the Chief, Deputy Chief and all three Assistant Chiefs.

=== 2009 shootout ===
On April 4, 2009, three Pittsburgh police officers were killed in the line of duty while responding to a domestic disturbance in the Stanton Heights area of the city. The officers, all from Zone 5 are Eric Kelly, a 14-year veteran of the Bureau, Stephen Mayhle, and Paul Sciullo II, both two-year veterans. Two other officers were injured. Timothy McManaway was shot in the hand trying to help Officer Kelly, and Brian Jones broke his leg when a fence collapsed. Police Chief Nathan Harper said Officer Mayhle was married and had two children; Officer Kelly was married and had three children; and Officer Sciullo was single.

== Demographics ==
=== Current Demographics (2019) ===
- Male: 85.46%
- Female: 14.54%

- American Indian or Alaskan: 0.44%
- Asian or Pacific Islander: 0.98%
- Black: 12.35%
- Hispanic: 1.09%
- White: 84.81%
- Unknown/Undisclosed: 0.55%

=== Demographics of Recruits (2019) ===
- Male: 87.64%
- Female: 12.36%

- American Indian or Alaskan: 0%
- Asian or Pacific Islander: 0%
- Black: 5.62%
- Hispanic: 1.12%
- White: 77.53%
- Unknown/Undisclosed: 5.62%

== In popular culture ==
The city of Pittsburgh is well known throughout the world as having its official colors not only on everything from the official seal and flag to fire hydrants, fire trucks and police cars, but also shared by all of its pro sports teams, and more recently featured in rap/rally videos. Although the Pittsburgh Steelers are the only team to have these colors throughout their entire history (starting in 1933), the Pittsburgh Pirates (1948-present) and the Pittsburgh Penguins (1967, 1975, 1980–present) have for generations also been associated with "black and gold". However, the very first team in the city's history to associate with its official seal/flag colors were the original NHL franchise Pittsburgh Pirates. The police department of Pittsburgh was instrumental in establishing the "black and gold" tradition for the region's sports teams, in that the team's owner, attorney James Callahan, asked his police officer brother for used and surplus seals and emblems from old police uniforms in 1925. From those donated "logos" the tradition of "black and gold" for the city's franchises was born.

The Pittsburgh Police have been featured in many television and film portrayals. Among them:

=== Television ===
- Vic Cianca, a traffic cop, was featured in Candid Camera winning an annual prize from the show in 1965 and subsequently featured in Budweiser commercials, on Italian TV and a cameo in Flashdance.
- Hill Street Blues: What is now Pittsburgh's Zone 2 "Hill District" (not Street) station was the inspiration for the show.
- COPS: seven episodes in the 1990s, several others in the mid first decade of the 21st century
- The X Files, the Pittsburgh Police feature as a backdrop to four Pittsburgh- and Western Pennsylvania–based episodes.
- Smith: The Pittsburgh police chase Ray Liotta and Amy Smart among others after a heist at the fictional Tanner Museum (actually the Mellon Institute of Industrial Research). The chase passes through the David L. Lawrence Convention Center and past PNC Park onto the Ohio River and is complete with diversionary explosions and human decoys.
- The Guardian: Simon Baker, Dabney Coleman and Farrah Fawcett (along with a cameo by Will Ferrell) all work with the police and are the subject of some police investigations in this deep drama about life and redemption.
- Sirens: mid-1990s ABC series about female Pittsburgh Police officers.
- The Kill Point: 2007 cable mini-series in which the Pittsburgh Police led by Donnie Wahlberg and the FBI attempt to handle a downtown bank robbery led by John Leguizamo that turns into a hostage situation.
- Blacks and Blue: 1998 NBC News series with Geraldo Rivera reporting on the bureau's operations.
- Top Sniper 2: the Pittsburgh Police S.W.A.T. team was featured as winners of the 2008 competition with it airing on the Military Channel in March 2009.
- Stranger Things Season 2, Episode 1 (MADMAX), at the beginning of episode one, bank robbers are chased by the Pittsburgh Police in 1984.

=== Film ===
- Flashdance features several Pittsburgh cops during different scenes, most notably candid camera fame Vic Cianca's cameo appearance with star Jennifer Beals.
- Desperate Measures: Pittsburgh Police double for San Franciscans as Andy García hunts a demented Michael Keaton within the maze of corridors that form One Mellon Center and the Allegheny County Courthouse portraying a 'hospital'.
- Dawn of the Dead: Pittsburgh Police—among others—mount a defense against zombies in this political satire against "mall culture"
- Sudden Death: Pittsburgh Police and SWAT respond to the U.S. Vice President being held hostage at the Stanley Cup Final at Mellon Arena while Jean-Claude Van Damme provides the heroics.
- Striking Distance: high drama film about corruption and coverups where Bruce Willis, Sarah Jessica Parker and Dennis Farina play Pittsburgh police officers.
- Screwed: a comedy about a shrewd Pittsburgh Police detective and a kidnapping gone crazy with help from Dave Chappelle and Norm Macdonald.
- Wonder Boys: a "Boy Scout" hounds Michael Douglas' character in the morning hours at the professor's house.
- Hoffa: a motorcycle cop in 1960s urban America pulls over Danny DeVito's character outside of Gateway Center.
- Boys on the Side: Pittsburgh Police chase down Drew Barrymore.
- Inspector Gadget: Pittsburgh gets recast as "Riverton" as the Police go high tech.
- Land of the Dead even though filmed in Toronto and Hamilton, Ontario, Canada, locations in film are to appear as Pittsburgh.
- The Clearing: Robert Redford's character as a 'prominent Pittsburgh businessman' is abducted and held for ransom as the Pittsburgh Police and FBI are portrayed attempting to solve the case.
- The Next Three Days: features the Pittsburgh Police prominently as Russell Crowe battles to prove his wife's innocence during a murder trial.
- In the Name of the Law: a police superintendent hurls baseballs off the 150+ foot high roof of Pittsburgh City Hall as Pittsburgh Pirates Hall of Famer Honus Wagner comes to the city's rescue with daring catches on the street below.
- Dominick and Eugene
- Chasing 3000
- The Mysteries of Pittsburgh
- Jack Reacher
- The Perks of Being a Wallflower
- The Dark Knight Rises: Heinz Field is used for a fictional Gotham football team when Bane interrupts a game and holds the place hostage.
- Acts of Vengeance: Karl Urban plays Pittsburgh Police officer Hank Strode, the Pittsburgh Police Officers in the film all have the authentic uniform but the name "Pittsburgh" on the uniforms has been changed to "Metropolitan".

== See also ==
- Allegheny County Sheriff (sister agency)
- Allegheny County District Attorney
- Allegheny County Police Department (sister agency)
- List of law enforcement agencies in Pennsylvania
- 2009 shooting of Pittsburgh police officers
- Vic Cianca
- William Tecumseh Barks, second African-American to become an officer in the department
