= Corruption of Blood =

Corruption of Blood may refer to:

- Corruption of Blood, a 1994 crime novel by Michael Gruber (author) / Robert K. Tanenbaum
- Attainder § Corruption of blood, a concept in English criminal law
