= Single-bullet theory =

Theory about 1963 Kennedy assassination

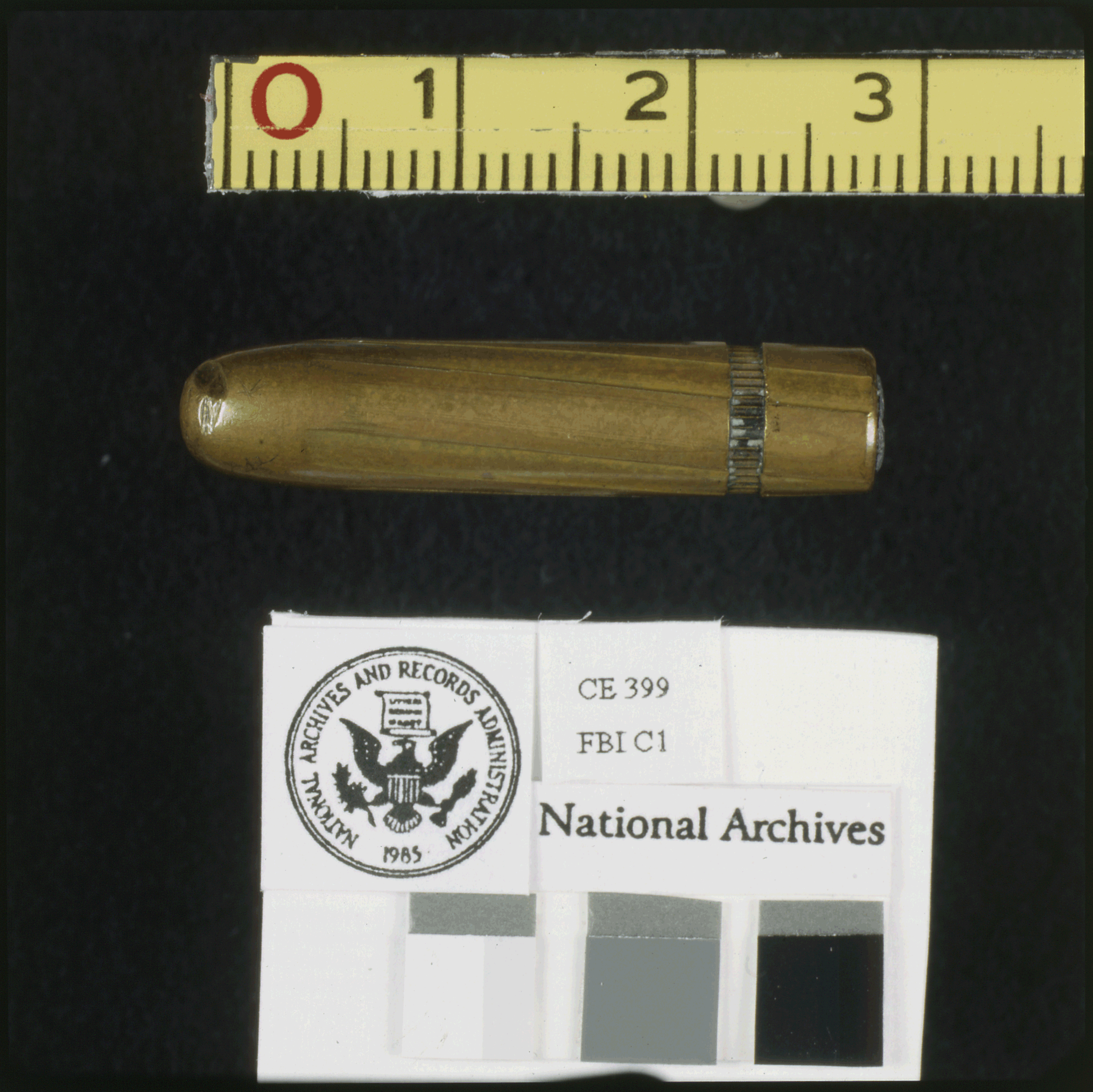
CE 399, the single bullet described in the theory

The single-bullet theory, also known as the magic-bullet theory, was introduced by the Warren Commission in its investigation of the assassination of U.S. President John F. Kennedy to explain what happened to the bullet that struck Kennedy in the back and exited through his throat. Given the lack of damage to the presidential limousine consistent with it having been struck by a high-velocity bullet, and the fact that Texas Governor John Connally was wounded and was seated on a jumper seat 1 1/2 feet (0.5 meters) in front of and slightly to the left of the president, the Commission concluded they were likely struck by the same bullet.

Generally credited to Warren Commission staffer Arlen Specter (later a United States senator from Pennsylvania), this theory posits that a single bullet, known as "Warren Commission Exhibit 399" or "CE 399", caused all the wounds to the governor and the non-fatal wounds to the president, which totals up to seven entry/exit wounds in both men.

The theory says that a three-centimeter-long (1.2") copper-jacketed lead-core rifle bullet from a Model 91/38 Carcano, fired from the sixth floor of the Texas School Book Depository, passed through President Kennedy's neck into Governor Connally's chest, went through his right wrist, and embedded itself in Connally's left thigh. If so, this bullet traversed a back brace, 15 layers of clothing, seven layers of skin, and approximately 15 inches (38 cm) of muscle tissue, and pulverized 4 inches (10 cm) of Connally's rib, and shattered his radius bone. The bullet was found on a gurney in the corridor at Parkland Memorial Hospital after the assassination. The Warren Commission found that this gurney was the one that had carried Governor Connally.

In its final conclusion, the Warren Commission found "persuasive evidence from the experts" that a single bullet caused President Kennedy's throat wound, and all of the wounds found in Governor Connally. It acknowledged that there was a "difference of opinion" among members of the Commission "as to this probability", but stated that the theory was not essential to its conclusions and that all members had no doubt that all shots were fired from the sixth-floor window of the Depository building.

Most critics believe that the single-bullet theory is essential to the Warren Commission's conclusion that Lee Harvey Oswald acted alone. The reason for this is timing: if, as the Warren Commission found, President Kennedy was wounded some time between frames 210 and 225 of the Zapruder film, and Governor Connally was wounded in the back/chest no later than frame 240, there would not have been enough time between the wounding of the two men for Oswald to have fired two shots from his bolt-action rifle. FBI marksmen, who test-fired the rifle for the Warren Commission, concluded that the "minimum time for getting off two successive well-aimed shots on the rifle is approximately 2 and a quarter seconds", or 41 to 42 Zapruder frames.

The United States House Select Committee on Assassinations published their report in 1979 stating that their "forensic pathology panel's conclusions were consistent with the so-called single bullet theory advanced by the Warren Commission".

== Origin ==
The first preliminary report on the assassination, issued by the FBI on December 9, 1963, said: "Three shots rang out. Two bullets struck President Kennedy, and one wounded Governor Connally." After the report was written, the FBI received the official autopsy report which indicated that the bullet that struck the president in the back had exited through his throat. The FBI had written its report partly based on an initial autopsy report written by its agents which reflected the early presumption that that bullet had only penetrated several inches into the president's back and had likely fallen out. The FBI concluded, therefore, that the governor had been struck by a separate bullet.

The Warren Commission commenced study of the Zapruder film, the only known film to capture the entire assassination sequence, on January 27, 1964. By then, the FBI had determined that the running speed of Abraham Zapruder's camera was 18.3 frames per second, and that the Carcano rifle found at the Texas School Book Depository, the presumed murder weapon, could not be accurately fired twice in under 2.3 seconds, or 42 frames of the Zapruder film.

When the Commission requested and received after February 25 higher-resolution images of the Zapruder film from Life magazine, who had purchased the film from Zapruder, it was immediately apparent that there was a timing problem with the FBI's conclusion that three bullets had found their mark. Kennedy was observed by the Commission to be waving to the crowd at frame 205 of the Zapruder film as he disappears behind the Stemmons Freeway sign, and seems to be reacting to a shot as he emerges from behind the sign a little more than a second later at frames 225 and 226. In their initial viewing of the film, Connally seemed to be reacting to being struck between frames 235 and 240.

Given the earliest possible frame at which Kennedy could have been struck (frame 205), and the minimum 42 frames (2.3 seconds) required between shots, there seemed to be insufficient time for separate bullets to be fired from the rifle. Several assistant counsels, upon viewing the film for the first time, concluded there had to be two assassins.

On April 14 and 21, two conferences were held at the Commission to determine when, exactly, the president and governor were struck. Assistant counsel Melvin Eisenberg wrote in a memorandum dated April 22 on the first conference that the consensus of those attending was, among other issues, that Kennedy was struck by frames 225–6 and that "the velocity of the first bullet [which struck Kennedy] would have been little diminished by its passage through the President. Therefore, if Governor Connally was in the path of the bullet it would have struck him and caused the wounds he sustained in his chest cavity... Strong indications that this occurred are provided by the facts that... if the first bullet did not strike Governor Connally, it should have ripped up the car but it apparently did not."

However, the memorandum stated, given the relatively undamaged condition of the bullet presumed to have done this, CE 399, the consensus was a separate bullet probably struck his wrist and thigh. While not specifying a precise frame for when it was thought Connally was struck by the same bullet which struck Kennedy, the consensus was "by Z235" as afterwards his body position would not have allowed his back to be struck the way it was.

By the end of April 1964, the Commission had its working theory, the single-bullet theory, to account for the apparent timing discrepancies found in the Zapruder film and the lack of any damage to the limousine from a high-velocity bullet exiting the president's throat. Impact damage was observed in the limousine, but was indicative of lower-velocity bullets or bullet fragments. For example, a nick on the limousine's chrome was not from a high-velocity bullet as such a bullet would have pierced the chrome, not merely dented it.

On May 24, the FBI and Secret Service reenacted the shooting in Dallas and the Commission tested its theory. Agents acting as the president and the governor sat in a car of approximately the same dimensions of the presidential limousine, which was unavailable for the re-creation. Adjustments to measurements were made to account for the differences in the vehicles. Positions were recreated by matching them to particular frames of the Zapruder film, calibrated with other films and photographs taken that day. With the agents in position, photographs were taken from the sniper's nest of the Texas School Book Depository.

It was from this re-creation, and the testimony of the agent in the sniper's nest, that the Commission verified the theory to its satisfaction, as the governor was in a direct line to be struck by any bullet fired between frames 207 and 235 to 240 which exited the president's throat. The agent testified that from frame 226 onward, the governor was "too much towards the front" and his wounds were therefore misaligned from that point. An oak tree partially obscured the line of sight until frame 210, so the Commission concluded that "the President was not hit until at least frame 210 and that he was probably hit by frame 225".

Further evidence gathered suggested to the Commission that the initial April consensus that a separate bullet caused the governor's wrist and thigh injuries was incorrect, as the Army Wound Ballistics experts concluded that those wounds were "not caused by a pristine bullet," and therefore bullet CE 399 "could have caused all his wounds". Other evidence, such as the nature of Connally's back wound (see below), was also cited by the Commission as corroborating the theory.

The Commission did not conclude the single-bullet theory had been proven, as three members of the body, Representative Hale Boggs, Senators Richard Russell and John Cooper thought the theory improbable. Russell requested that his opposition to the theory be stated in a footnote in the report. In the end, the Commission changed the word "compelling" to "persuasive" and stated: "Although it is not necessary to any essential findings of the Commission to determine just which shot hit Governor Connally, there is very persuasive evidence to indicate that the same bullet which pierced the President's throat also caused Governor Connally's wounds."

Nevertheless, all seven members of the Commission signed off on the statement: "There was no question in the mind of any member of the Commission that all the shots which caused the President's and Governor Connally's wounds were fired from the sixth floor window of the Texas School Book Depository."

== Number and sequence of the shots ==
Within minutes after the shots rang out in Dealey Plaza in downtown Dallas, Texas, at 12:30 p.m. on November 22, 1963, sources began reporting that three shots had been fired at the President's motorcade. At 12:34 p.m., approximately four minutes after the shots were fired, the first wire story flashed around the world:

DALLAS NOV. 22 (UPI) -- THREE SHOTS WERE FIRED AT PRESIDENT KENNEDY'S MOTORCADE TODAY IN DOWNTOWN DALLAS. JT1234PCS

This report had been transmitted by United Press International (UPI) reporter Merriman Smith from a radio telephone located in the front seat of the press car in the Presidential motorcade, six cars behind the President's limousine. Smith's communication with the Dallas UPI office was made less than a minute after the shots were heard, as his car entered the Stemmons freeway en route to Dallas' Parkland Memorial Hospital.

Merriman Smith's dispatch was the first of many reports. Photographers Robert Jackson and Tom Dillard riding in a car in the motorcade heard three shots. The Dallas Morning News reporter Mary Woodward described hearing three shots as she stood in front of the Texas School Book Depository.

There has been some controversy regarding the number of shots fired during the assassination. The Warren Commission concluded that three shots were fired. Of 178 witnesses whose evidence was compiled by the House Select Committee on Assassinations (HSCA), the vast majority, 132 (74%), reported hearing exactly three shots, 17 (9.5%) recalled hearing two, 7 (4%) said they heard two or three shots (total: 88%). A total of 6 people (3%) said they thought they heard four shots, and 9 (5%) said they were not sure how many shots they heard. Another 7 people said they thought they heard 1, 5, 6, or 8 shots.

Governor Connally, riding in the middle jump seat of the President's limousine in front of the President, recalled hearing the first shot which he immediately recognized as a rifle shot. He said he immediately feared an assassination attempt and turned to his right to look back to see the President. He looked over his right shoulder but did not catch the President out of the corner of his eye so he said he began to turn back to look to his left when he felt a forceful impact to his back. He stated to the Warren Commission: "I immediately, when I was hit, I said, 'Oh, no, no, no.' And then I said, 'My God, they are going to kill us all.'" He looked down and saw that his chest was covered with blood and thought he had been fatally shot. Then he heard the third and final shot, which sprayed blood and brain tissue over them.

Nellie Connally said she heard the first shot and saw President Kennedy with his hands at his neck reacting to what she later realized was his neck wound. After the first shot, she heard her husband yell, "Oh, no, no, no" and turn to his right, away from her. Then she heard a second shot, which hit her husband. She saw him recoil away from her and saw that he was hit. She immediately reached over and pulled him toward her into her arms and lay backward. Then she heard the third and final shot. Mrs. Connally said she never looked into the back seat of the car after her husband was shot.

According to the single-bullet theory, one shot passed through President Kennedy's neck and caused all of Governor Connally's wounds (he was wounded in the chest, right wrist, and left thigh), and one of the shots must have missed the limousine entirely. The Connallys never accepted the theory. While they agreed with the Warren Commission's conclusion that Oswald acted alone, they insisted that all three shots struck occupants of the limousine.

== Location of back wound ==
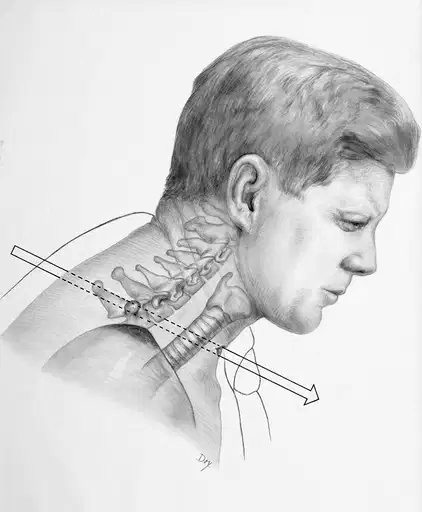
Diagram of bullet's path from HSCA report.

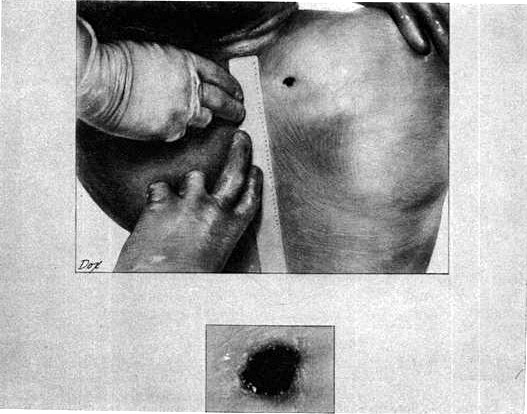
Drawing depicting the back wound of President Kennedy. Made from an autopsy photograph.

President Kennedy's death certificate places the bullet wound to Kennedy's back at about the third thoracic vertebra. The death certificate was signed by Dr. George Burkley, the President's personal physician. As interpreted by the House Select Committee on Assassinations Forensic Pathology Panel, the autopsy photos and autopsy X-rays show a bullet hole at the first thoracic vertebra. The bullet hole in the shirt worn by Kennedy and the bullet hole in the suit jacket worn by Kennedy both show bullet holes between 5 and 6 inches (13 and 15 cm) below the top of Kennedy's collar.

These do not necessarily correspond with bullet wounds, since Kennedy was struck with his arm raised in the air, and multiple photos taken of the President during the motorcade show that his jacket was bunched in the rear below his collar. On February 19, 2007, the film shot by George Jefferies was released. This 8 mm film, which was taken approximately 90 seconds before the shooting, clearly shows that President Kennedy's suit coat was bunched up around the neckline around the time of the assassination.

The theory of a "single bullet" places a bullet wound as shown in the autopsy photos and X-rays, at the first thoracic vertebra of the vertebral column. The official autopsy report on the President, Warren Exhibit CE 386, described the back wound as being oval-shaped, 6 x 4 mm, and located "above the upper border of the scapula" [shoulder blade] at a location 14 cm (5.5 in) from the tip of the right acromion process, and 14 cm (5.5 in) below the right mastoid process (the boney prominence behind the ear). The report reported contusion (bruise) of the apex (top tip) of the right lung in the region where it rises above the clavicle, and noted that although the apex of the right lung and the parietal pleural membrane over it had been bruised, they were not penetrated. The report noted that the thoracic cavity was not penetrated.

The concluding page of the Bethesda autopsy report states: "The other missile [referring to the body-penetrating bullet] entered the right superior posterior thorax above the scapula, and traversed the soft tissues of the supra-scapular and the supra-clavicular portions of the base of the right side of the neck. This missile produced contusions of the right apical parietal pleura and of the apical portion of the right upper lobe of the lung. The missile contused the strap muscles of the right side of the neck, damaged the trachea, and made its exit through the anterior surface of the neck."

The conclusion of bullet entry specifically at the first thoracic vertebra was made in a 1979 report on the Kennedy assassination by the HSCA Forensic Pathology Panel, which created Figure [24] for their report to demonstrate this entrance location. This position is consistent with the back wound location in Figure 4 of their report, a drawing made from one of the still-unreleased autopsy photos. It is also consistent with the unofficial versions of this photo available on the internet. The HSCA examined these photographs and X-rays before rendering its opinions as to bullet entry and exit locations, and obtained testimony from autopsy physicians that these were the correct photographs and X-rays taken during the autopsy.

=== Importance of bullet entry level to theory ===
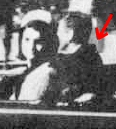
Croft photo taken at about Zapruder frame 162, shortly before the first bullet strike to the president, shows his jacket significantly bunched just before he is hit.

The importance of how low or high the bullet struck the President in the back is a matter of possible geometry. The Sibert/O'Neill FBI autopsy report original made by two FBI agents (Special Agents James W. Sibert and Francis X. O'Neill) present at the autopsy preserves genuine confusion among the medical doctors present during the autopsy, caused by apparent lack of an exit wound, which was cleared up later in the official report after new and more complete information became available (the exit had been hidden by a tracheotomy incision). This report does note that the doctor (Commander Humes) at the time said that he was unable to locate an "outlet" for the wound in Kennedy's shoulder (not his back).

At the time of the autopsy, toward the end of the procedure, initial probing of the shoulder wound suggested the bullet entered the base of Kennedy's neck at a 45 to 60 degree angle. At least two shell casings were found near the window at the southeast corner side of the TSBD on the sixth floor, and with the fact that movement was seen in the same corner window from bystanders below, just previous to when the cars arrived, and also because of the proximity of the initial investigations' shell casing evidence collected to that of the nearest window.

A window that was said by some to have been partly opened at the moment of the shots, all leading the Warren Commission to focus solely on this location in their investigation as the source of gunfire and so decided to have a team of surveyors measure the angles from that said window to the locations of the street, which, would roughly correspond to the location of Kennedy seated in his limousine, when seen in the Zapruder Film, riding along Elm Street at frames 210, and 225. During so, it was found that the downward angle from the horizontal, was 21.57 degrees at frame 210, and 20.18 degrees at frame 225.

The street sloped at 3.15 degrees (3° 9') away from the depository building. This would have made the angle through the president between 17 and 18.5 degrees, assuming that Kennedy was sitting upright, in his seat. The Commission concluded that this angle was consistent with the bullet making the observed paths through the President's upper body and striking Governor Connally in the right armpit.

The weight of bullet CE 399 was reported in the Warren Commission Report as 158.6 grains (10.28 grams). It was found that the weight of a single, unfired bullet ranged from 159.8 to 161.5 grains with an average weight of 160.844 grains. The lead fragments retrieved from Connally's wounds in the wrist (there were no fragments in the chest) weighed about 2 grains (130 milligrams).

Dr. Robert Shaw described the wound on Connally's back as "a small wound of entrance, roughly elliptical in shape, and approximately a cm. and a half in its longest diameter, in the right posterior shoulder, which is medial to the fold of the axilla".

The bullet entered just at the edge of the scapula and followed the fifth rib, shattering the last 10 cm of the rib before exiting on the right side of his chest just below the right nipple. According to the theory, the bullet then went through the Governor's jacket cuff about 0.5 cm from the end, the shirt's French cuff about 1.5 cm from the end, struck and shattered his radius leaving many dark fibers and small fragments of metal in the wound, and exited on the palm side of his wrist above the cuff. There was a hole about 0.5 cm from the end of the jacket sleeve and a hole through the back of the doubled French cuff but no exit hole on the palm side.

According to the theory, the bullet emerged from the palm side of the wrist and entered the left thigh. This bullet is thought to be CE 399, which was later recovered from Parkland Hospital after it was heard falling onto a hallway floor as a hospital employee adjusted one of two patient stretchers, partially obstructing his maneuvers as he performed his routine. Using ballistics CE 399 was matched to the rifle found in the Texas School Book Depository, to the exclusion of all other rifles.

== Theorized path of the bullet CE 399 ==
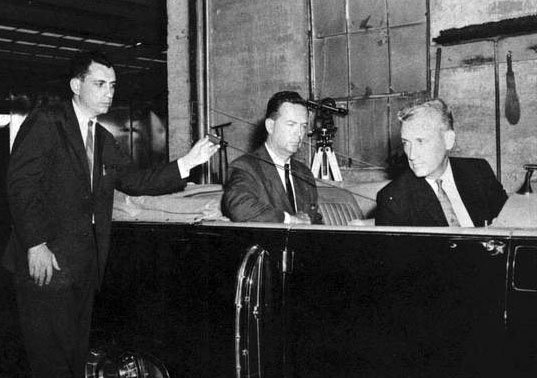
Arlen Specter reproducing the assumed alignment of the single-bullet theory.

Trajectory of CE 399 according to some critics, such as Robert Groden and Harrison Livingston; their book High Treason features a similar diagram; trajectories such as this one gave rise to the term "magic bullet".

Trajectory according to some modern theorists; note the relative positions of seats.

The following description assumes that bullet CE 399 hit high, at the sixth cervical vertebra rather than the third thoracic vertebra: The 6.5 millimeter, 161 grain, round nose military style full metal jacket bullet, which was manufactured by the Western Cartridge Company and later stored nearly whole in the U.S. National Archives, was first theorized by the Warren Commission to have:

- ballistically arced very slightly while traveling 189 ft (58 m) in a downward net angle of 19 degrees (allowing for the 3 degrees downward slope of Elm Street), after an initial supersonic rifle exit muzzle velocity of 1,850 to 2,000 feet per second (560 to 610 m/s), then entered President Kennedy's rear suit coat at about 1,700 feet per second (520 m/s),
- impacted, then entered President Kennedy 2 inches (51 mm) to the right of his spine, creating a wound documented size of 4 millimeters by 7 millimeters in the rear of his upper back with a red-brown to black area of skin surrounding the wound, forming what is called an abrasion collar. This abrasion collar was caused by the bullet's scraping the margins of the skin on penetration and is characteristic of a gunshot wound of entrance. This abrasion collar was photographically documented to be larger at the lower margin half of the wound, which is strong evidence that the bullet's long-axis orientation at the instant of penetration was slightly upward in relation to the plane of the skin immediately surrounding the wound; however, the skin of Kennedy's upper back slopes inward, and the Croft photo (taken at Zapruder frame 162, shortly before Kennedy was hit) shows the President slumped forward. This would suggest that a shooting position above and to the rear of Kennedy was possible
- damaged the President's first thoracic vertebra. (There is debate whether the bullet itself struck the vertebra and caused this damage, or whether a pressure cavity wave created by the bullet's passage was responsible),
- passed through his neck. Warren Exhibit CE 386 reported contusion (bruise) of the apex of the right lung in the region where it rises above the clavicle, and noted that, although the apex of the right lung and the parietal pleural membrane over it had been bruised, they were not penetrated. This is consistent with a bullet passing through the neck, immediately over the top tip of the right lung (the pressure wave causing bruising to both pleural membrane and apex of lung), but without penetrating the thoracic cavity, or the lung beneath.
- after passing through the neck, exited President Kennedy's throat, at the centerline below the President's Adam's apple. Within three hours of the assassination, this neck frontal wound was described in an afternoon press conference by the Parkland trauma room #1 emergency physician, Doctor Malcolm Perry, after he attended to the frontal throat wound, as being an "entrance wound". Doctor Perry stated the neck frontal wound "appeared to be" an entrance wound three times during his press conference. However, medical researchers have found that ER doctors frequently make mistakes with regard to entrance and exit wounds, and both Perry and Dr. Carrico, the other attending ER doctor, later testified at the Warren hearing that with a full jacketed bullet the wound in the front of the throat could have been either an entrance or exit wound; the Parkland ER doctors also never examined the wound in the back and could make no comparisons with it. Within nineteen hours of his press conference statement (but after the autopsy had already been completed), Doctor Perry also described via telephone to Doctor Humes, one of the three U.S. Navy Bethesda Hospital military autopsists, that the neck front wound was originally only "3 to 5 millimeters" in circular width before doctor Perry attended to the front throat wound (Humes documented Perry's "3 to 5 millimeters" wound size by writing it down during the phone conversation),
- passed through both sides of his shirt collar-front in alignment with the collar button buttoned, about 7–8 inches (18–20 cm) below the center top collar button and collar button hole, in line with the throat wound, and with the threads in both bullet-slits forced outward, showing this to be an exit wound,
- nicked President Kennedy's tie-knot on its upper left side. Upon clearing the tie-knot the bullet had slowed to about 1,500 feet per second (460 m/s) and had started to tumble,
- traveled the 25.5 inches (650 mm) between President Kennedy and Governor Connally,
- impacted and entered Connally's back just below and behind his right armpit creating an 8 millimeter by 15 millimeter elliptical wound, indicating that the bullet was fired from an acute angle to the entrance wound point, or that the bullet was tumbling, having hit something on its earlier way (presumably Kennedy); according to Connally, the impact of the bullet was very forceful. In terms of the physics of this impact, this means that the bullet imparted part of its momentum to Connally's body and therefore the bullet's momentum changed (in speed or direction or both) upon entering his body;
- completely destroyed 127 millimetres (5.0 in) of Connally's fifth right rib bone as it smashed through his chest interior at a documented 10-degree anatomically downward angle (post-operative x-rays document that some of the metal fragments remained in Connally's wrist for life and were buried with him many years later. There were no fragments seen in any chest x-rays),
- exited slightly below his right nipple, creating a 50 millimeter, sucking-air, blowout chest wound,
- passed through Connally's shirt and suit coat front, exiting roughly central on the coat's right side, just under the lowest point of the right lapel,
- slowed to 900 feet per second (270 m/s) (subsonic), and entered through Connally's right upper (outside) wrist, but missed his suit coat sleeve. It penetrated the doubled French cuff shirt sleeve at the wrist area but did not penetrate the cuff on exit (in 2003 Nellie Connally described in her book "From Love Field" that Connally's right hand solid-gold "Mexican peso" cufflink was struck with a bullet, and the cufflink was completely shot off during the attack. This is not evident from the physical appearance of the shirt which bears no mark, tear or hole at the cufflink area. Connally's cufflink was apparently never found — thus never entered — into the assassination evidence),
- broken his right radius wrist bone at its widest point, depositing metal fragments (post-operative x-rays document that some of the metal fragments are still buried with him, as mentioned above),
- exited the palm (inner) side of Connally's wrist,
- slowed to 400 feet per second (120 m/s) and entered the front side of his left thigh, creating a documented 10-millimeter nearly round wound,
- buried itself shallowly into Connally's left thigh muscles,
- then fallen out at Parkland Hospital, perhaps when Connally was undressed,
- landed on Connally's gurney,
- been discovered by hospital engineer Darrell C. Tomlinson after it rolled into view after Connally's gurney was bumped.

Regarding the bullet that he remembered impacting his back, Connally stated, "...the most curious discovery of all took place when they rolled me off the stretcher and onto the examining table. A metal object fell to the floor, with a click no louder than a wedding band. The nurse picked it up and slipped it into her pocket. It was the bullet from my body, the one that passed through my back, chest, and wrist, and worked itself loose from my thigh." Connally does not say how he determined this object to have been a bullet, rather than his missing gold cufflink.

The Warren Commission's "single bullet," according to all documentation:

- had no thread striations (fine lines etched onto a copper encased bullet tip and/or bullet side casing by clothing threads when the bullet first penetrates clothing threads),
- was marked with no blood,
- was marked with no human tissue,
- had no pieces of clothing attached,
- had lost 1.5% of its original average weight,
- had a composition that was consistent with the composition of the metal fragments recovered from Connally (see section on neutron activation analysis).

This "single bullet," which was full metal jacketed and specifically designed to pass through the human body, was deformed and not in a pristine state as some detractors claim. Though a side view seems to show no visible damage, a view from the end of the bullet shows a significant flattening which occurred when, according to the theory, the bullet struck Connally's wrist, butt end first. The metallurgical composition of the bullet fragments in the wrist was compared to the composition of the samples taken from the base of CE 399.

Several of the same type 6.5 millimeter test bullets were test-fired by the Warren Commission investigators. The test bullet that most matched the slight side flattening and nearly pristine, still rounded impact tip of CE 399 was a bullet that had only been fired into a long tube containing a thick layer of cotton. Later tests show that such bullets survive intact when fired into solid wood and multiple layers of skin and ballistic gel, as well.

CE 399 is stored out of the public's view in the National Archives and Records Administration, though numerous pictures of the bullet are available on the NARA website.

Ballistics experts have performed test shots through animal flesh and bones with cloth covering. Under the assumption of an adjusted relative position of President Kennedy and Governor Connally within the car, some, but not all, of the Warren Commission ballistics experts considered it possible that the same bullet that passed through the President's neck may have caused all of the governor's wounds.

== ABC's The Kennedy Assassination: Beyond Conspiracy ==
In 1993 computer animator Dale Myers embarked on a 10-year project to completely render the events of November 22 in 3D computer animation. His results were shown as part of ABC's documentary The Kennedy Assassination: Beyond Conspiracy in 2003, and won an Emmy award.

To render his animation, Myers took photographs, home footage, blueprints and plans, and attempted to use them to create an accurate computer reenactment of the assassination. His work was assessed by Z-Axis, who have been involved in producing computer-generated animations of events, processes and concepts for major litigation in the United States and Europe.

Their assessment concluded that Myers's animation allowed the assassination sequence to be viewed "from any point of view with absolute geometric integrity" and that they "believe that the thoroughness and detail incorporated into his work is well beyond that required to present a fair and accurate depiction".

Myers's animation found that the bullet wounds were consistent with JFK's and Governor Connally's positions at the time of shooting, and that by following the bullet's trajectory backwards it could be found to have originated from a narrow cone including only a few windows of the sixth floor of the School Book Depository, one of which was the sniper's nest of boxes from which the rifle barrel had been seen protruding by witnesses.

In the same ABC documentary, Myers uses a close-up examination of the Zapruder film to justify the single-bullet theory and calls attention to frames 223 and 224 on the Zapruder film, where the right-side lapel of Governor Connally's jacket appears to "pop out," as if being pushed from within by an unseen force. Myers theorizes that this is the moment of impact, when both Kennedy and Connally were struck by the same bullet from Oswald's rifle. Myers also argues that in frames 225–230 both Kennedy and Connally are simultaneously reacting to the impact of the bullet. There is no other point on the film which shows either Kennedy or Connally reacting because they have been shot. They both react at the same time, frame 225, because that is when the single bullet hits both of them.

If the bullet exited Connally's chest below the nipple, the lapel would be too high to have popped out due to direct contact with the bullet. Surgeon John Lattimer has argued that the jacket bulged out because of the "hail of rib fragments and soft tissue" as the bullet tumbled in Connally's body.

== Discovery Channel's reenactment of bullet CE 399's path ==
In 2004, the Discovery Channel aired an episode of Unsolved History titled "JFK — Beyond the Magic Bullet". Their re-enactment of the assassination using current forensics and materials found that a single bullet almost exactly duplicated the path of travel specified in the single-bullet theory.

== Neutron activation analysis of bullet fragments ==
=== Original bullet lead analysis by Vincent Guinn ===
Warren Commission documents released after the publication of its report revealed that the FBI had arranged for bullet CE 399 and the various fragments found in the car and in Governor Connally's wounds to be examined using neutron activation analysis (NAA). NAA is a precise, non-destructive method of determining the relative concentrations of trace elements in a sample of matter. The data from the tests performed for the FBI were inconclusive as to the origins of the fragments.

In 1978 the HSCA asked physicist Vincent P. Guinn to review the NAA data and conduct new tests. Guinn did so and presented his results and analysis to the Committee. Guinn stated that initially he agreed with the earlier conclusion. After examining the old and new NAA data further, he concluded that all the fragments probably came from two bullets, one of which was the whole bullet, CE 399.

Guinn compared antimony concentrations of Exhibits CE 840, 843 and 567 with that of Exhibits CE 399 and CE 842 and concluded that the data supported the single-bullet theory in that all the bullet lead in the car and wounds originated from no more than two bullets.

=== Conclusions about the single-bullet theory from the NAA analysis ===
Whether the NAA data can be used to actually exclude the possibility that there were fragments from more than two bullets in the wounds and the car has been the subject of controversy.

Ken Rahn of the University of Rhode Island, a chemist and meteorologist who has a long-standing interest in the Kennedy Assassination, maintains that the NAA data excludes a "three bullet hit" and proves the single-bullet theory actually occurred. His analysis was published in 2004 co-authored with Larry Sturdivan, a Warren Commission and HSCA ballistics expert.

Rahn/Sturdivan say that the possibility that the wrist fragment CE 842 (with an antimony concentration of 797±7 ppm) did not come from the base of the whole bullet CE 399 (the sample from which had an antimony concentration of 833±9 ppm) is so statistically improbable as to be excluded as a reasonable possibility.

Contradicting this conclusion, in an article published in July 2006 in the Journal of Forensic Sciences by Erik Randich and Patrick M Grant, the authors took a significantly different view of the NAA data and the metallurgical profile of the Carcano ammunition. The authors found errors in the analysis by Guinn:

Thus, elevated concentrations of antimony and copper at crystallographic grain boundaries, the widely varying sizes of grains in MC bullet lead, and the 5–60 mg bullet samples analyzed for assassination intelligence effectively resulted in operational sampling error for the analyses. This deficiency was not considered in the original data interpretation and resulted in an invalid conclusion in favor of the single-bullet theory of the assassination.

Randich and Grant concluded:

The end-result of these metallurgical considerations is that, from the antimony concentrations measured by VPG [Vincent P. Guinn] in the specimens from the JFK assassination, there is no justification for concluding that two, and only two, bullets were represented by the evidence.

The conclusion of Randich and Grant had been advanced earlier by Arthur Snyder of the Stanford Linear Accelerator Laboratory in a paper written in 2001.

In August 2006 Ken Rahn wrote a response critical of the Randich/Grant paper on his website claiming that Randich and Grant did not analyse the data correctly:

Both sections of the article failed to make their case. The metallurgical section contained a huge gap in its logic (proposing an explanation but failing to support it quantitatively), and predicted at least two features of the elemental data that were the opposite of that actually observed. The statistical section started well, but stumbled when it confused heterogeneity with analytical uncertainty and when it used confidence intervals instead of difference in means to assess the separation of the two groups of crime-scene fragments. Fixing these two errors gave the opposite result, i.e., confirmed that the groups were distinct.

Patrick Grant defended his and Erik Randich's paper against Rahn's critique in an article entitled Commentary on Dr. Ken Rahn's Work on the JFK Assassination Investigation and posted it on the MaryFerrell.org website.

=== Forensic use of compositional bullet lead analysis ===
The technique used by Guinn to analyse the bullet lead from the JFK assassination was a form of what has become known as Compositional Bullet Lead Analysis (CBLA). Until 2004 the FBI used this technique to determine whether a crime scene bullet lead sample came from a particular box of ammunition or a particular batch of bullets. Guinn claimed that with the JFK bullet fragments, the technique could be used to identify the exact bullet the fragments came from.

The validity of CBLA was discredited in a 2002 paper ("A Metallurgical Review of the Interpretation of Compositional Bullet Lead Analysis" (2002), 127 Forensic Science International, 174–191) co-authored by Randich and by former FBI Chief Metallurgist, William Tobin.

The 2002 Tobin/Randich paper prompted the National Academy of Sciences (Board on Chemical Science and Technology) to review the science of bullet lead analysis. In a report in 2004 the NAS found the scientific basis for matching bullet sources from the analysis of bullet lead composition as practiced by the FBI was flawed. As a result of that report, courts appear to have stopped accepting this evidence and the FBI has stopped using bullet lead analysis for forensic purposes.

The NAS report on CBLA, and its relevance to the Guinn's analysis of bullet lead in the JFK assassination, is the subject of comment by Randich and Grant in their 2006 paper at page 719.

== Criticisms of the single-bullet theory ==
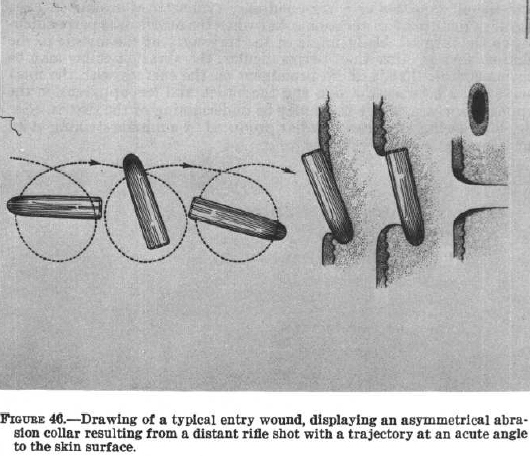
The HSCA concurred with the Warren Commission's single-bullet theory. (The figure illustrates how the oblong wound in Connally's back was indicative of a bullet which had been tumbling after striking an intervening object.)

Of the nine-member medical panel, only Dr. Cyril Wecht (testimony above) rejected the theory.

Critics of the single-bullet theory state that it is not possible that a single bullet could cause the number of wounds it did and still remain nearly intact. Some critics state that discrediting the theory would suggest the involvement of two shooters.

=== Analysis based on Zapruder film and physical evidence ===
Critics of the single-bullet thesis question not only the bullet's trajectory and relative lack of damage but also the question of timing of hits to both the president and Connally. A single bullet would have passed through both men in less than 1/100 of a second, which means that a strike of both men by a single bullet would have happened too quickly to be caught on more than a single Zapruder frame (these were exposed at 1/18th second intervals). From the Zapruder film one can see Kennedy with his hands in front of his chest near his throat as he emerges from behind the road sign at Zapruder frame 225.

According to one popular version of the single-bullet theory (promoted by Gerald Posner in his book, Case Closed), the interval between frame 223 and 224 is the time the same projectile passes through both Kennedy and Connally's body. It is not obvious at this point (frame 224) whether Connally has, or has not, been hit, however Connally, but not other limousine occupants, is newly blurred in frame 224 but not in frame 223. Connally himself, in analyzing the frame-by-frame Zapruder film, identified his own hit later at about Zapruder frame 230, whereas Kennedy is certainly hit about Zapruder frame 224, a third of a second earlier. Beginning immediately after frame 224, Connally rapidly raises then lowers both arms and turns to his right toward the Zapruder camera but it is not clear that he is turning to see what has happened to Kennedy.

Connally's cheeks then puff out and his mouth opens. Many suggest that he is beginning to show the shock of the bullet. Others suggest Connally is doing exactly what he said he did in reaction to hearing the first bullet: he said he realized an assassination was unfolding so he turned to see the President. It is at this point that some critics of the single-bullet theory believe Connally is actually hit by a second and separate bullet and this is also what Connally himself believed but only on the supposition that the first shot he heard was one that struck the president. (If the first shot missed the president then Connally's memory of being hit later corresponds with the single-bullet theory.) Proponents of the single-bullet thesis argue that Connally is simply exhibiting a delayed pain reaction to having been hit by the same bullet that hit Kennedy, a third of a second earlier.

Some critics believe the puffing out of Connally's cheeks is simply physics at work as the bullet collapses one of his lungs, forcing air into his mouth. Other critics believe the puffing of Connally's cheeks result from him shouting, "Oh, no, no, no", which his wife, Nellie, said he shouted after the first shot but before the second one. The premise that a collapsed lung would cause Connally's cheeks to puff out is dismissed by Michael Baden, chief forensic pathologist for the HSCA. "When the lung is punctured, as Connally's was, the air in the lung goes out into the chest cavity, not out of the mouth so Connally's cheeks puffing out would have not been caused by air trying to escape."

When an enhanced copy of the Zapruder film was released in 1998, many felt the delayed reaction theory was debunked. Others, particularly Posner, noted that Connally's right lapel flips up at frame 224 (it hides the right part of his white collar in frame 224, which is far more clearly seen in both frames 223 and 225). In this same frame, as noted above, Connally suddenly becomes blurred with regard to the rest of the automobile (Connally is clear in frame 223). Frame 224 is precisely the best-posited frame of the impact of the bullet to Kennedy, who is still behind the sign at this point. Zapruder himself does not appear to jump until frame 227, blurring all contents of the automobile.

Connally's immediate reaction after frame 224, including a flinch in which he flexes both elbows and brings his hat up, is seen by some as an unconscious reaction to the strike (single frames of this reaction appear to show Connally unharmed with hat held up in front of his chest, while Kennedy behind him has already clearly been hit). Others see this as Connally's reaction to the sound of the first shot. Immediately after the arm spasm, Connally begins a motion which drops his right shoulder and holds his right arm pinned to his right side, including a slow rolling motion toward this side. He also is seen to look over his right shoulder at Kennedy and shows an expression of pain only after turning his head back toward Zapruder's position around frame 275.

In the Oliver Stone movie JFK, Stone goes to great lengths to debunk the single-bullet theory, although some discrepancies exist between the narrative and the historical record. One example is when he shows Connally seated directly in front of Kennedy at the same height. In fact, Connally was seated in a jump seat the edge of which was 3 inches (7.5 cm) inboard and possibly 4 inches (10 cm) lower than Kennedy.

The House Select Committee concluded that Connally could have been as much as 6 inches (15 cm) to the left of Kennedy. Moreover, Stone has Connally looking straight ahead. However, when Connally emerges from behind the freeway sign at Zapruder frames 222–223, he is clearly rotated significantly to his right. These points are of critical importance in assessing whether the bullet that passed through Kennedy could have caused Connally's injuries. Computer recreations showing accurate body positioning of the two men show that their injuries, if caused at Zapruder frame 224, fall on a line which emanates from a circle enclosing several windows on the sixth floor of Texas Book Depository and includes the window of the sniper's nest.

Connally continued to hold his hat after the single bullet struck and broke his right wrist but critics contend this is not physically possible. However, in the Zapruder film Connally continues to clutch the hat even after Kennedy's head wound, this being a point generally agreed to be after Connally had already been hit. In fact, Connally's wife, Nellie Connally, stated that he held onto his hat until he was put on a stretcher at Parkland Hospital. Thus, it is reasonably clear that Connally continued to hold the hat after being hit. Wrist fracture would not preclude ability to hold a light object such as a hat, and Connally's nerve damage was limited to a superficial branch of the radial nerve which served a sensory function only and would not have interfered with his grip strength (nor was Connally's hand function in any way permanently harmed).

=== Right to left trajectory from 6th floor window ===
A further criticism of the single-bullet theory has to do with the apparent trajectory of the "single bullet". Perhaps the most outspoken critic of the single-bullet theory has been pathologist Dr. Cyril Wecht, who, as a member of the House Select Committee on Assassinations, wrote a dissenting opinion in which he explained why, in his view, the left-to-right trajectory from the sixth-floor window of the Texas School Book Depository through Kennedy's neck could not possibly intersect with Connally's right armpit. Wecht notes that in the photographs it appears that Connally is seated in the middle of the jump seat with Kennedy to the right side of his seat with his right arm resting on the top of the limousine side.

According to the analysis done by the HSCA, the horizontal angle from the 6th floor window of the Texas School Book Depository to the limousine at frame 190 or so was about 13 degrees, right to left. The vertical angle was about 21 degrees downward from the horizontal plane and 18 degrees relative the car which was going down at 3 degree slope.

If Connally was seated in the middle of his seat, the bullet should have struck him to the left of his spine. The HSCA concluded the thigh wound was made by a bullet traveling much slower than one would expect the bullet to have after exiting Kennedy's neck. The single-bullet theory holds that the bullet which struck Connally's thigh had also passed through his wrist, slowing it down in the process. Connally said that he never felt this thigh wound at any time until the next day. On the other hand, Dr. Shires, who operated on Connally's thigh wound, thought that the wound to the thigh, which he said extended to the region of the femur, could have been made by a bullet traveling at high speed striking the thigh on an angle.

The HSCA concluded that Connally was not seated in the middle of his seat but was about 7–8 inches (18–20 cm) to the left of that position. NASA Engineer Thomas Canning provided an analysis of the photograph taken by Hugh Betzner from the rear of the limousine a moment prior to the first shot. According to Betzner, he took the picture and began winding his camera to take another when the first shot sounded. It has been determined that Betzner's photograph was simultaneous with Zapruder frame 186.

Canning could not see Connally's shoulder in Betzner's photograph and concluded that this meant his shoulder was obscured by the person standing in front of Betzner. This, he said, put the shoulder well to the left of Kennedy's midline putting his right armpit in line with a right-to-left path through his neck. The analysis and conclusion of Canning depends on the correctness of the assumption that Connally's shoulder would have been visible if the man in front of Betzner was not there. The photo taken by James Altgens from a similar angle earlier on Houston Street would seem to indicate that Connally's shoulder was below the line of sight.

=== Chain of evidence ===
Some critics have questioned the circumstances surrounding the bullet's discovery at Parkland Hospital. In a 1966 interview with author Josiah Thompson, one of the men who found the bullet, Parkland personnel director O.P. Wright, cast doubt on whether it subsequently entered into evidence as CE 399 was the same bullet he held in his hand that day. Wright told Thompson that the bullet they found was point nosed, whereas CE 399 is round nosed. In 1964, both Wright and Darrel Tomlinson, a maintenance employee at Parkland who passed the bullet along to Wright, were shown the bullet and said the bullet in evidence appeared to be the same one as the bullet found on the stretcher, although neither could positively identify the bullet as the same one.

According to Kennedy's Secret Service agent, Paul E. Landis, when the presidential limousine was taken to Parkland hospital, he noticed there was a bullet lodged in the seat behind where Kennedy had been sitting. He took this bullet and left it on Kennedy's stretcher and said that he believes this was the same bullet which is said to have been discovered on Connally's gurney and which according to the single-bullet theory had struck Connally and then fallen out of his body.

== See also ==
- James Tague, a witness to the assassination, who was wounded from a concrete curb chip
- List of conspiracy theories
