= George W. Guthrie =

American politician (1848–1917)

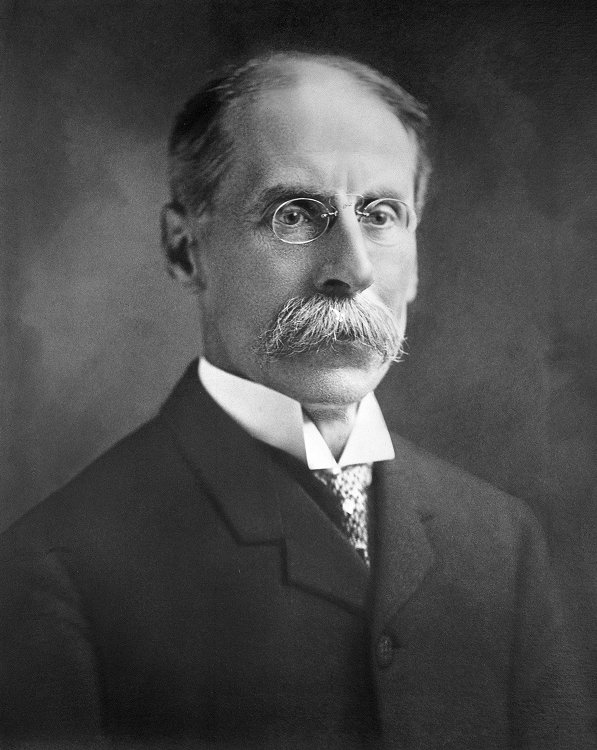
- Portrait of George W. Guthrie, c. 1906–1909

United States Ambassador to Japan
- In office August 7, 1913 – March 8, 1917
- President: Woodrow Wilson
- Preceded by: Larz Anderson
- Succeeded by: Roland S. Morris

42nd Mayor of Pittsburgh
- In office 1906–1909
- Preceded by: William B. Hays
- Succeeded by: William A. Magee

Personal details
- Born: September 5, 1848 Pittsburgh, Pennsylvania, US
- Died: March 8, 1917 (aged 68) Tokyo, Japan
- Resting place: Allegheny Cemetery
- Party: Democratic
- Education: University of Pittsburgh
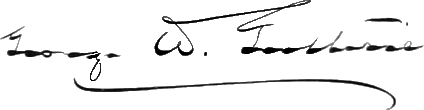
- Signature

George Wilkins Guthrie (September 5, 1848 – March 8, 1917) served as Mayor of Pittsburgh from 1906 to 1909 and then was United States Ambassador to Japan from 1913 to 1917.

== Early life ==
George Wilkins Guthrie was born in Pittsburgh on September 5, 1848, to John B. Guthrie and Catherine Murray Guthrie. Guthrie attended public school in Pittsburgh, then went to the University of Pittsburgh (then known as the Western University of Pennsylvania), where he graduated in 1866. Next, he studied law at the Columbian College for three years, at which point he was admitted to the bar (in Washington, DC and in Allegheny County on November 5, 1869). He became an attorney and started an involvement in reform issues during an era of increasing government corruption and largess. On December 2, 1886, he married Florence Julia Howe Guthrie, daughter of General Thomas Marshall Howe of Pittsburgh.

== Pittsburgh politics ==
Guthrie, a Democrat, ran for mayor of Pittsburgh in 1896 and was defeated narrowly by Henry P. Ford. Guthrie was elected mayor in 1906 and immediately started instituting city policies to stem local corruption, and while working locally he also pushed for statewide reforms. Guthrie is best remembered for two accomplishments. First, for the success of the legislation he and D.T. Watson, the famous corporate lawyer, created which led to the merger between Pittsburgh and Allegheny City in 1906. This consolidation, legally controversial and unpopular among Allegheny residents withstood challenges in the Pennsylvania and United States Supreme Courts, and made the new Greater Pittsburgh the sixth largest city in the United States. Second, the implementation of a water filtration system during Guthrie's term significantly reduced the incidence of typhoid in Pittsburgh. The first filtered water, cleaned in a slow sand filter, was delivered on December 18, 1907, and by October 3, 1908, the entire water supply of Pittsburgh was being filtered. Guthrie's term was noted for a significant decline in the city's death rate due to improvement in public health. The rate had been among the highest in America's northern cities, around 20 per 1,000 inhabitants, a level at which it had been stuck for 20 years. By the end of his term, the rate had fallen to 16 per 1,000, the lowest in Pittsburgh's history to that point. Notable declines were seen in incidences of typhoid fever.

== Later life ==
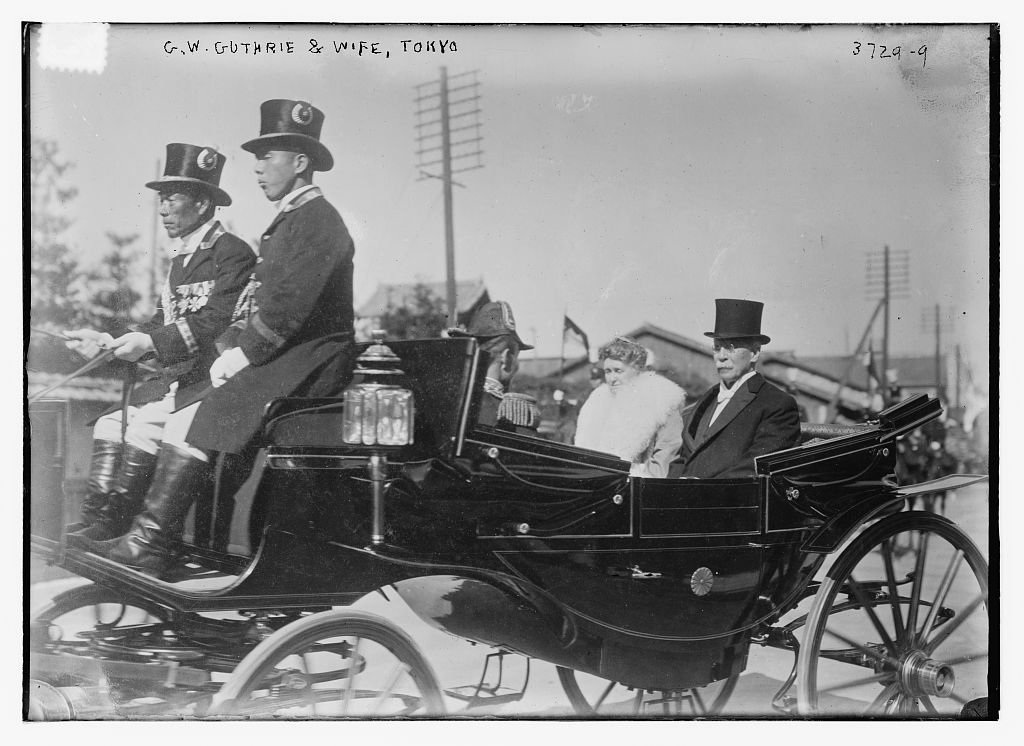
George Wilkins Guthrie and wife Florence Julia Howe Guthrie in Japan in 1915

After leaving office, Guthrie was appointed United States Ambassador to Japan on May 20, 1913. He was accredited as special Ambassador and represented the President and the people of the United States at the funeral of Empress Shōken, the Dowager Empress of Japan, on April 7, 1914, and was the personal representative of President Wilson at the coronation of Emperor Taishō of Japan on September 30, 1915. He died while at that post in Tokyo in 1917, after collapsing while playing golf with an American reporter. The Japanese government sent the armored cruiser Azuma to return his body to San Francisco as a mark of respect. He was vice president and Trustee of the Dollar Savings Bank of Pittsburgh, a Trustee of the University of Pittsburgh, a member of the Board of Managers of St. Margaret's Memorial Hospital and the Kingsley House Association, a member of the Greater Pittsburgh Chamber of Commerce, and the Pittsburgh and Duquesne Golf Clubs. He was internationally known for his activities in Masonic bodies and served as Past Grand Master of Pennsylvania Masons. He is buried in Allegheny Cemetery in Lawrenceville, PA.

== Honors ==
Guthrie Street in the Pittsburgh neighborhood of Regent Square was constructed in 1910 and named in the Mayor's honor.

Party political offices
Preceded by William H. Sowden	Democratic nominee for Lieutenant Governor of Pennsylvania; 1902	Succeeded by Jeremiah S. Black
Political offices
Preceded by William B. Hays	Mayor of Pittsburgh; 1906–1909	Succeeded by William A. Magee
Diplomatic posts
Preceded by Larz Anderson	U.S. Ambassador to Japan; 1913–1917	Succeeded by Roland S. Morris
