= Bernard McKenna =

Bernard McKenna may refer to:

- Bernard J. McKenna (1842–1903), American politician in Pennsylvania
- Bernard McKenna (writer) (born 1944), Scottish-born British television comedy writer
- Barney McKenna (Bernard Noël McKenna, 1939–2012), Irish musician "Banjo Barney"
