= Bernard J. McKenna =

American politician (1842–1903)

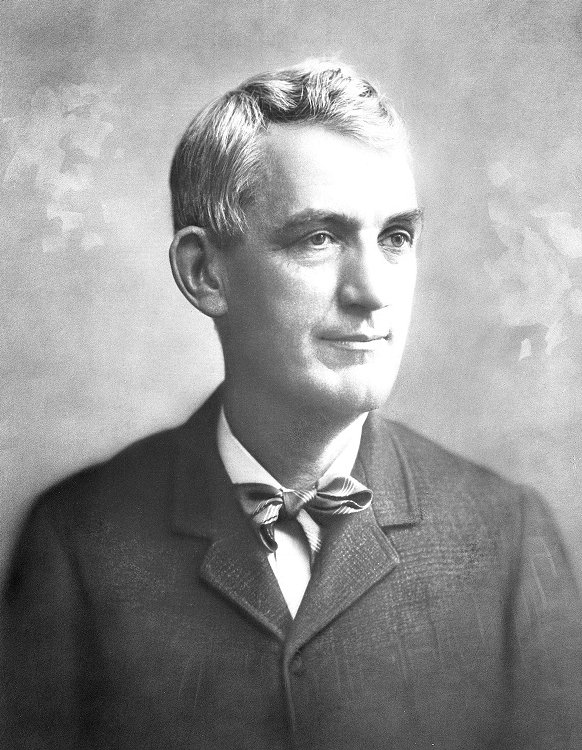
- Portrait of Bernard J. McKenna, c. 1893–1895

36th Mayor of Pittsburgh
- In office 1893–1896
- Preceded by: Henry I. Gourley
- Succeeded by: Henry P. Ford

Personal details
- Born: February 16, 1842
- Died: June 18, 1903 (aged 61)
- Spouse: Mary McShane (m. 1872)
- Children: Kate (McKenna) McNulty, Frank McKenna, William B. McKenna

Bernard J. McKenna (February 16, 1842 – June 18, 1903) was the Mayor of Pittsburgh from 1893 to 1896. His nickname was "Barney."

== Early life ==
Born on February 16, 1842, on Penn Avenue near Ninth Street in Pittsburgh, Pennsylvania, the building in which he would later conduct his duties as a city alderman during his adult years, McKenna was a son of labor activist and politician James McKenna and grandson of Hugh McKenna, who had emigrated from Tyrone, Ireland to Quebec, Canada, and then on foot to Pittsburgh during the early 1800s.

Educated in Pittsburgh's third and fourth ward public schools, as well as the school at St. Paul's Cathedral, he was subsequently hired as an apprentice by John C. Parry & Co., where he learned the iron molding trade.

Sometime around 1862, while just twenty years old, he was elected to the post of captain of the Allegheny Volunteer Fire Company; he would go on to become one of the first volunteers to be given a paid job with the company. McKenna reportedly also served on a gunboat during the American Civil War.

After returning home to Pittsburgh, he worked in the iron industry, eventually organizing and becoming treasurer of the Iron Molders' Union, No. 11.

In 1872, he married Mary McShane.

== Pittsburgh politics and later life ==
A member of the Democratic Party, McKenna was elected to the Pittsburgh city council in 1875, and served as an alderman for the city's Fourth Ward. In 1888, he was appointed as a police magistrate.

In 1893, he launched a successful bid to become mayor. His administration oversaw the completion of the Highland Park Zoo; the Carnegie Library's main branch was also completed during his time in office.

On September 12, 1894, he addressed a crowd of former Union Army soldiers, in his capacity as Pittsburgh's mayor, during the opening of the twenty-eighth National Encampment of the Grand Army of the Republic, which was held at Pittsburgh's Grand Opera House. On December 29, 1895, he delivered a welcome address to the members of the Pennsylvania State Music Teachers Association during the opening of their annual convention, which was held that year at Pittsburgh's Carnegie Music Hall. On New Year's Day in 1896, Andrew Carnegie announced that he was appointing McKenna to serve as one of the thirty-six members of the newly created board of trustees of the Carnegie Art Gallery Fund. Also named to the first board were prominent Pittsburgh civic leaders William Jacob Holland and the Rev. Dr. Andrew Arnold Lambing.

Following his tenure as mayor, he was appointed and re-appointed as police magistrate of the city's First Ward by his immediate successors, Mayors Henry P. Ford, William J. Diehl, Adam M. Brown, and Joseph O. Brown, serving in that capacity from 1896 to 1903.

In 1893, McKenna and his wife moved to a home on Howe Street in Pittsburgh's Twentieth Ward.

== Death, funeral and interment ==
Following a long period of illness, McKenna died from heart and stomach-related complications at his Marchand Street home in Pittsburgh on June 18, 1903. Friends were invited to pay their respects at a viewing of the body at his home on June 18. According to The Pittsburgh Post, "The body was placed before a bank of palms, on a couch in the library." His pallbearers were his friends William J. Brennen, Michael Feeney, John S. Flannery, Charles E. Flinn, Joseph F. Joyce, John Kearns, John J. Sweeney, and S.J. Toole. Three former Pittsburgh mayors were among those chosen to be honorary pallbearers. Thousands of mourners reportedly paid their respects during the viewing at his former home. The funeral was held at Sacred Heart Church on Saturday, June 20, and interment took place at St. Mary's Cemetery in the Pittsburgh neighborhood of Lawrenceville.

Political offices
Preceded by Henry I. Gourley	Mayor of Pittsburgh; 1893–1896	Succeeded by Henry P. Ford
