= Jeffrey Locker =

American author and motivational speaker

- Born: Jeffrey Locker; December 22, 1956
- Died: July 16, 2009 (aged 52); New York City
- Occupations: Author and motivational speaker
- Known for: Co-authoring a 1998 self-help book and giving presentations on handling workplace stress

Jeffrey Locker (died 2009) was an American self-help author and motivational speaker.

== Death and aftermath ==
In 2009, Locker hired Kenneth Minor to kill him so his family would collect $18 million in insurance benefits. Minor claimed that Locker, a married father of three from Long Island, hired him to "do a Kevorkian". Locker was found dead in his car, in East Harlem, bound and stabbed.

Longtime Allegheny County Medical Examiner Dr. Cyril Wecht testified as a defense expert on behalf of Minor.

Minor was sentenced to 20 years to life for the murder of Locker. The conviction was thrown out in a unanimous 5-0 appeals court ruling which found that the judge gave bad instructions to the jury. In October 2014, Minor accepted a plea deal, and was sentenced to 12 years. He was released in 2019.

Eventually Federal Judge William Kuntz ruled that the $4 million policy issued by Principal Life Insurance should be voided because Locker had substantially misstated his annual income as $800,000 when, in truth, his gross income at the time was no more than $225,000 and he was deeply in debt.
