= The Book of Air and Shadows =

The Book of Air and Shadows is a thriller novel by Michael Gruber published in 2007.

== Plot summary ==
Set concurrently in the 17th century and the current century, the novel is an intriguing and complex thriller based on the mystery of William Shakespeare. Jake Mishkin, a lonely and troubled lapsed Catholic intellectual property lawyer (though he is generally assumed to be Jewish-American despite his Waffen SS Officer grandfather) teams up with a young man, Albert Crosetti, who has taken a job at an antiquarian bookstore in the hope of saving enough to fund his studies at NYU film school. Together they hunt for Shakespeare's elusive lost manuscript.
