= Joseph O. Brown =

American politician (1846–1903)

40th Mayor of Pittsburgh
- In office November 25, 1901 – March 15, 1903

Personal details
- Born: Joseph Owen Brown; January 8, 1846 Tarentum, Pennsylvania, U.S.
- Died: March 15, 1903 (aged 57) Pittsburgh, Pennsylvania, U.S.
- Resting place: Bull Creek Cemetery
- Party: Republican

Joseph Owen Brown (January 8, 1846 – March 15, 1903) served as Mayor of Pittsburgh from November 25, 1901 to March 15, 1903.

== Biography ==
He was born on January 8, 1846, in what is today East Deer Township, Pennsylvania, just north of Pittsburgh. He served as prothonotary of Allegheny County, Pennsylvania from 1880 until 1887. His first political position in Pittsburgh was director of public safety, a job he obtained in 1887.

Mayor Joseph Brown's administration battled rampant vice within the city with differing degrees of success. The incompetence of the rank and file law enforcers in the city was displayed for everyone to see when the Biddle Brothers made a daring escape from the Pittsburgh jail. The Frick Building was constructed on Grant Street during the Joseph Brown term.

He died in office from heart failure on March 15, 1903. He was buried at Bull Creek Cemetery, not far away from his hometown, Tarentum, Pennsylvania.

== See also ==
- List of mayors of Pittsburgh

Political offices
Preceded by Adam M. Brown	Mayor of Pittsburgh; 1901–1903	Succeeded by William B. Hays
