= William B. Hays =

American politician

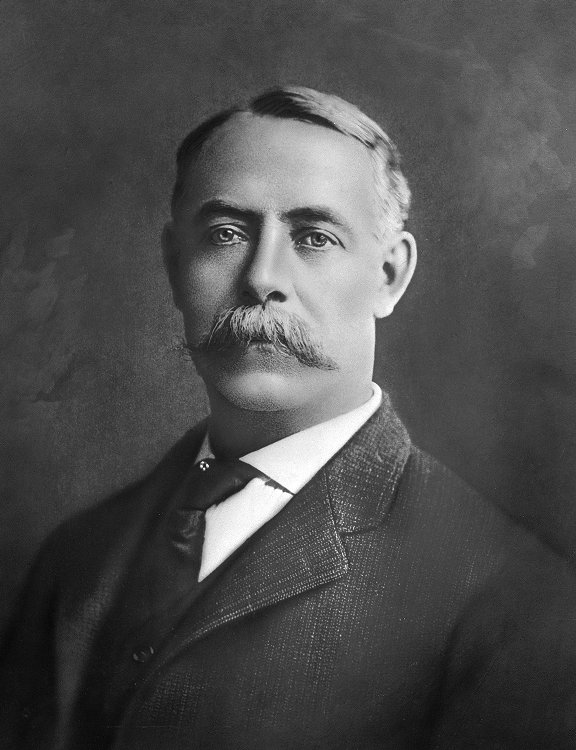
- Portrait of William B. Hays, c. 1903–1906

41st Mayor of Pittsburgh
- In office 1903–1906
- Preceded by: Joseph O. Brown
- Succeeded by: George W. Guthrie

Personal details
- Born: January 12, 1844
- Died: September 16, 1912 (aged 68)

William Bratton Hays (January 12, 1844 – September 16, 1912) served as Mayor of Pittsburgh from March 15, 1903 to 1906.

== Early life ==
Hays was born into a meat packing family in 1844. He made his fortune in the coal industry in nearby Indiana County, Pennsylvania; he was also involved in the lumber business in North Carolina.

== Pittsburgh politics ==
Hays first served in government as city assessor.

Since early 1901, Pittsburgh was in great political turmoil after the Pennsylvania governor, William A. Stone, installed the recordership instead of mayor in the city, and the anti-ring forces(including Edward Bigelow and recorder Adam Brown) and pro-ring forces(including Joseph O. Brown) vied for the control of the city government and others. Against this background, Hays was voted in as mayor in early 1903 with the support from anti-ring forces, headed by Thomas Bigelow, the brother of Edward Bigelow, the former Director of Public Works.

Hays presided over some of Pittsburgh's feats and disasters. The Pittsburgh Pirates went to the first ever World Series in 1903, and the film industry's first Nickelodeon movie theater was opened on Smithfield Street in 1905.

== Later life ==
Hays died in 1912 and was buried in Allegheny Cemetery. The Hays neighborhood of Pittsburgh was named in his honor.

== See also ==
- List of mayors of Pittsburgh

Political offices
Preceded by Joseph O. Brown	Mayor of Pittsburgh; 1903–1906	Succeeded by George W. Guthrie
