= Cyril Wecht =

American forensic pathologist (1931–2024)

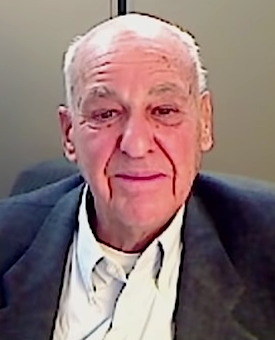
- Wecht in 2020

Allegheny County Medical Examiner
- In office December 29, 2005 – January 20, 2006
- Preceded by: Himself as Coroner
- Succeeded by: Abdulrezak Shakir (Acting)^{[a]}

Allegheny County Coroner
- In office January 1, 1996 – December 29, 2005
- Preceded by: F. James Gregis (Acting)^{[b]}
- Succeeded by: Himself as Medical Examiner
- In office January 2, 1970 – January 9, 1980
- Preceded by: Ralph Stalter
- Succeeded by: Joshua Perper (Acting)^{[c]}

Member of the Allegheny County Board of Commissioners
- In office January 7, 1980 – January 2, 1984
- Preceded by: Jim Flaherty
- Succeeded by: Pete Flaherty

Chairperson of the Allegheny County Democratic Party
- In office June 1, 1978 – May 30, 1984
- Preceded by: Eugene Coon
- Succeeded by: Ed Stevens

Personal details
- Born: Cyril Harrison Wecht; March 20, 1931 Pittsburgh, Pennsylvania, U.S.
- Died: May 13, 2024 (aged 93) Pittsburgh, Pennsylvania, U.S.
- Party: Democratic
- Spouse: Sigrid Ronsdal (m. 1961)
- Children: 4, including David
- Education: University of Pittsburgh (B.S., M.D., LLB); University of Maryland School of Law (J.D.)
- Occupation: Forensic pathologist Politician; Attorney
- a.Shakir held the title of Acting Medical Examiner while a national search was undertaken to find a permanent successor to Wecht. In December 2006, Karl Williams was formally appointed Medical Examiner. b.Gregis held the title of Acting Coroner from the date of Joshua Perper's resignation in July 1994, until Wecht was elected to permanently fill the vacancy. c.Perper held the title of Acting Coroner from the date of Wecht's resignation, until the State Supreme Court upheld Dr. Sanford Edberg's appointment to the office on March 2, 1981.

Cyril Harrison Wecht (March 20, 1931 – May 13, 2024) was an American forensic pathologist and attorney. He was president of both the American Academy of Forensic Sciences and the American College of Legal Medicine, and headed the board of trustees of the American Board of Legal Medicine. Wecht served as County Commissioner and Allegheny County Coroner and Medical Examiner, serving the Pittsburgh metropolitan area. He was perhaps best known for his criticism of the Warren Commission's findings concerning the assassination of John F. Kennedy.

== Background ==
Wecht was born to Jewish immigrant parents in Pittsburgh in 1931, but spent his early years in a tiny mining village in Dunkard Township, Pennsylvania, called Bobtown. His father, Nathan Wecht, was a Lithuanian-born storekeeper; his Ukrainian-born mother, Fannie Rubenstein, was a homemaker and helped out in the store. When Wecht was seven, Nathan moved the family first to McKees Rocks, Pennsylvania, and then to the Hill District neighborhood of Pittsburgh, opening a neighborhood grocery store. He attended and graduated from the now closed Fifth Avenue High School in Pittsburgh.

Wecht had musical leanings and was concertmaster of the University of Pittsburgh Orchestra during his undergraduate years. He earned a Bachelor of Science from the University of Pittsburgh in 1952, an M.D. degree from the University of Pittsburgh School of Medicine in 1956, a Bachelor of Law from the University of Pittsburgh School of Law in 1962, and a Juris Doctor degree from the University of Maryland School of Law. In 1959, he served in the United States Air Force at the Air Force Hospital, Maxwell Air Force Base, Alabama, where he became a captain in the medical corps. He became a forensic pathologist. He served on the staff of St. Francis Hospital in Pittsburgh before becoming Deputy Coroner of Allegheny County in 1965. Four years later he was elected coroner. Wecht served as coroner from 1970 to 1980, and again from 1996 to 2006.

== Forensics career ==
Cyril, obviously, is a national figure, international figure, in many ways so we're lucky to have someone of his stature here in Allegheny County.

— Rich Fitzgerald

Wecht became famous appearing on television and consulting on deaths with a high media profile. Some of the cases include Robert F. Kennedy, Sharon Tate, Brian Jones, the Symbionese Liberation Army shootout, John F. Kennedy, the Legionnaires' Disease outbreak, Elvis Presley, Kurt Cobain, JonBenét Ramsey, Dr. Herman Tarnower (the Scarsdale diet guru), Danielle van Dam, Sunny von Bülow, the Branch Davidian incident, Vincent Foster, Laci Peterson, Daniel and Anna Nicole Smith, Jeffrey Epstein, and Rebecca Zahau. During his career, Wecht performed more than 17,000 autopsies. He was a clinical professor at the University of Pittsburgh School of Medicine and an adjunct professor of law at Duquesne University.

In 2000, the Duquesne University School of Law established the Cyril H. Wecht Institute of Forensic Science and Law. The Institute offers graduate degree and professional certificate programs in forensic science to a diverse group of students spanning the disciplines of law, nursing, law enforcement, pharmacy, the health sciences, business, the environmental sciences and psychology.

=== Cyril H. Wecht and Pathology Associates ===
From 1962, Wecht had a private practice. He served as a medical-legal and forensic pathology consultant in both civil and criminal cases.

Wecht was frequently an expert witness in legal cases; he testified at the 1971 medical malpractice suit filed by the widow of Bailey Goss, 1997 criminal trial of police officers Milton Mulholland and Michael Albert in the killing of Jonny Gammage; the 2000 civil trial against the State of Ohio relating to the Sam Sheppard case, the 2011 criminal trial of Jeffrey Locker in the death of Jeffrey Locker, and the 2018 wrongful death trial arising from the death of Rebecca Zahau.

His forensic consultant engagements included:

- for the Los Angeles County Coroner's Office in regard to the 1968 Robert F. Kennedy assassination, the 1969 Sharon Tate/LaBianca cases, and the 1974 Symbionese Liberation Army Deaths;
- for the Health Hospital, Panama Canal Zone as a member of the Special Expert Panel on American Legionnaires' Disease (Department of Health, Education and Welfare, Centers for Disease Control)
- for the ABC network television show 20/20 in regard to the John F. Kennedy assassination (1976) and the death of Elvis Presley (1979)
- U.S. House of Representatives Select Committee on Assassinations, Forensic Pathology Panel
- for the 1991 film JFK
- the expert on the Jeffrey Locker case.

==== JFK assassination ====
In 1965, Wecht presented a paper critiquing the Warren Commission to the meeting of the American Academy of Forensic Sciences. In 1972, Wecht was the first civilian ever given permission to examine the Kennedy assassination evidence. It was Wecht who first discovered that Kennedy's brain, and all related data in the killing, had gone missing.

In 1978, he testified before the House Select Committee on Assassinations as the lone dissenter on a nine-member forensic pathology panel re-examining the assassination of John F. Kennedy, which had concurred with the Warren Commission conclusions and single bullet theory. Out of the four official examinations into the Kennedy assassination, Wecht was the only forensic pathologist who disagreed with the conclusion that both the single bullet theory and Kennedy's head wounds are mutually consistent.

In 1988 he appeared in The Men Who Killed Kennedy. Wecht was a consultant to Oliver Stone for the 1991 film JFK. Wecht penned the introduction to Robert J. Groden's book The Search for Lee Harvey Oswald: The Comprehensive Photographic Record (1995). He was interviewed for the 2021 documentary JFK Revisited: Through the Looking Glass.

==== Investigation into the death of Daniel Smith ====
Wecht was hired by Callenders and Co, a Bahamian law firm, to do an independent autopsy on the body of Daniel Smith, the son of Anna Nicole Smith, who died while visiting his mother in the Bahamas. Wecht attested that Daniel Smith died as a result of the interaction of methadone, sertraline (Zoloft) and escitalopram (Lexapro).

=== Books ===
Wecht wrote many books, including:

- From Crime Scene to Courtroom (2011)
- Investigation of Police Related Deaths (2011)
- Forensic Science and Law (2006)
- Tales from the Morgue (2005)
- Forensic Aspects of Chemical and Biological Terrorism (2004)
- Mortal Evidence (2003)
- Into EVIDENCE: Truth, Lies and Unresolved Mysteries in the Murder of JFK
- November 22, 1963: A Reference Guide to the JFK Assassination
- Grave Secrets: A Leading Forensic Expert Reveals the Startling Truth about O.J. Simpson, David Koresh, Vincent Foster, and Other Sensational Cases
- Who Killed JonBenet Ramsey?
- A Question of Murder
- Cause of Death (1993)
- Legal Medicine (1985)
- Exploring the Medical Malpractice Dilemma (1972)
- Preparing and Winning Medical Negligence Cases (2016)
- Forensic Pathology in Civil & Criminal Cases (2016)
- The Life and Deaths of Cyril Wecht: Memoirs of America's Most Controversial Forensic Pathologist (2020)
- The JFK Assassination Dissected: An Analysis by Forensic Pathologist Cyril Wecht (2021)
- Final Exams: True Crime Cases from Forensic Pathologist Cyril Wecht (2021)

== Political career ==
=== Early years (1965–1985) ===
In 1965, Wecht became Deputy Coroner of Allegheny County. Four years later he was elected Coroner of Allegheny County. Wecht served as coroner from 1970 to 1980. His initial departure from the office of Coroner was not met without controversy. Wecht did not resign as Coroner until January 9, two days after his swearing-in as an Allegheny County Commissioner, as the law did not prohibit him from holding both the offices of Coroner and Commissioner.

Wecht resigned under pressure from a variety of sources, including his predecessor as Coroner, Dr. Ralph Stalter, a Republican, and the administration of Governor Dick Thornburgh, also a Republican. He initially recommended that Dr. Joshua Perper succeed him, and indeed Perper held the title of Acting Coroner until Thornburgh appointed Dr. Sanford Edburg to succeed Wecht. While Perper initially rejected the appointment as unconstitutional, the State Supreme Court upheld Thornburgh's right to appoint Edberg, who duly took over the office of Coroner on March 2, 1981.

In 1978, he was elected chairman of the Allegheny County Democratic Party. One year later, Wecht was elected to the Allegheny County Board of Commissioners. In 1982, he was the Democratic party's nominee to oppose freshman Republican Senator John Heinz in a bid for a second term; Heinz won the election with 59 percent of the vote.

Wecht and fellow Democratic County Commissioner Tom Foerster were frequently at odds, and battled for control of the Democratic Party in Allegheny County, which Wecht chaired. Although the Democratic Committee rejected Foerster and endorsed Wecht for re-election as commissioner in 1983, the committee paired him with Sheriff Gene Coon, with whom he also had a longstanding political feud.

Foerster teamed up with former Pittsburgh Mayor Pete Flaherty, and the two defeated Wecht and Coon in the primary election for the two Democratic nominations. Wecht then lost the chairmanship of the county's Democratic Party in 1984 to Foerster's hand-picked candidate, Scott Township Tax Collector Ed Stevens. Wecht then sought to become chair of the Pennsylvania Democratic Party that same year, but was defeated by Ed Mezvinsky, a former Congressman from Iowa.

=== Later years (1995–2006) ===
In 1995, Wecht, after 12 years out of public life, was again elected as Allegheny County's Coroner. In 1999, he ran for the newly created position of Allegheny County Chief Executive, defeating one-term minority County Commissioner Mike Dawida in the Democratic primary, but losing to prominent Republican businessman Jim Roddey in Roddey's first bid for elective public office.

While serving as the county's coroner, Wecht continued to operate a private forensic consulting business on the side known as Wecht Pathology Associates, which charges clients for examining cases, conducting autopsies, and testifying in civil and criminal trials. In his official capacity as county coroner, Wecht continued to squabble with DA Zappala, often over deaths that took place during encounters with police.

In the case that led to Wecht's federal prosecution (US vs. Wecht), Wecht ruled that Charles Dixon had been suffocated through positional asphyxiation during a 2002 encounter with police officers from Mount Oliver and Pittsburgh. When Wecht ruled the death of Dixon a homicide, DA Zappala refused to press charges against the officers. In response, Wecht, acting in his private capacity as an employee of Wecht Pathology Associates, wrote a medical opinion outlining the officers' alleged role in Dixon's death which was utilized by Dixon's family in a civil suit against the county.

In response to Wecht's testimony in the Dixon case, Zappala accused Wecht of violating the federal Hobbs Act, which prohibits public officials from using their offices for private gain. In early 2005, Zappala launched an investigation into whether Wecht had been using county resources to carry out private work — allegations similar to those Wecht had faced before. By spring of 2005, FBI agents were seizing documents in Wecht's private and county offices.

Wecht continued to serve as Coroner until the position was eliminated in 2006. County Executive Dan Onorato named him as the county's first appointed Medical Examiner in 2006. By January 2006, a federal grand jury had indicted Wecht on 84 criminal counts, prompting Wecht to step down from his county post per an agreement he made when the investigation became public in 2004 that if indicted he would resign as county coroner.

== Court cases ==
=== Allegheny County criminal trial (1979–1981) ===
Wecht's tenure as Allegheny County Coroner was controversial. While he was responsible for significant upgrades in the professionalism and technology of the coroner's office during his service in that office from 1970 to 1980, making the Allegheny County Coroner's office one of the best in the nation, Wecht's political career proved controversial due to his opinionated nature and, (as he put it), his unwillingness to "run away from a fight."

In 1979 Wecht was accused of performing autopsies for other counties at the county morgue and depositing the fees from these autopsies in his private business's bank account. Wecht responded that the funds in question had been used solely to upgrade the office and staff.

After a long investigation, Wecht was indicted on multiple criminal counts that charged Wecht with personally profiting from work at the coroner's office. Wecht allegedly transacted approximately $400,000 of his private business work using county facilities and the county morgue. In spring 1981, the six-week-long criminal trial began. All charges were dismissed except for one, theft of services. Wecht was acquitted on the remaining charge.

The original judge at trial was censured by a judge's panel and some findings vacated due to judicial misconduct. Wecht's attorneys alleged that he was a victim of a political conspiracy.

=== Allegheny County civil trial ===
Although Wecht was acquitted in the criminal case, the County Controller levied a civil surcharge of $390,000 against him for mingling private and public work at the morgue. In 1983, a civil court ruled that Wecht owed the county $172,410. On appeal, the original award to the county was increased to $250,000. In 1992, the county and Wecht reached a settlement resulting in Wecht having to repay the county $200,000.

=== Federal criminal trial ===
On January 28, 2008, a federal trial against Wecht began, on charges of public corruption. Roughly two weeks prior to the trial, 43 of the 84 counts against Wecht were withdrawn; judge Arthur J. Schwab dismissed those charges with prejudice. Following trial the jury could not reach agreement on the remaining counts, and the judge declared a mistrial. The prosecution immediately announced that they planned to retry Wecht.

Concerns were raised about the motivation and conduct of the prosecution before and after the trial. Speculation arose that the prosecution of Wecht was politically motivated. Former U.S. Attorney General and Governor of Pennsylvania Dick Thornburgh, a Republican who had been a political opponent of Wecht's, agreed to serve as his defense lawyer; Thornburgh further testified before a United States House of Representatives panel investigating the U.S. Attorneys' Firing Scandal that Wecht was targeted politically.

U.S. Congressmen Mike Doyle (whose district includes Pittsburgh) and John Conyers questioned the prosecution's tactics in the aftermath of the first trial and instituted Congressional hearings on the matter.

Op-eds in The Pittsburgh Post-Gazette and the Pittsburgh Tribune-Review called for dismissal of the proposed re-trial. On April 12, 2008, 33 prominent leaders in the Pittsburgh community sent a letter to the Attorney General Michael Mukasey and U.S. Attorney Mary Beth Buchanan requesting that the prosecution dismiss the indictment against Wecht. Shortly after the press release of this letter, Senator Arlen Specter publicly recommended against a retrial for Wecht. Former jurors stated to the press that they believed that the prosecution had been politically motivated.

On May 5, 2008, the Department of Justice's Office of Professional Responsibility (OPR) revealed that it initiated an investigation into the Wecht prosecution due to claims that the case was a "selective prosecution".

On May 14, 2009, a new trial judge in the retrial excluded most of the evidence against Wecht because it was seized under an illegal and improperly executed search warrant.

On June 2, 2009, Buchanan announced that her office would file a motion to dismiss all charges against Wecht.

== Personal life ==
In October 1961, Wecht married Sigrid Ronsdal, a Norwegian immigrant. They had four children, including David Wecht, an Associate Justice of the Supreme Court of Pennsylvania.

On May 16, 2020, Wecht promoted a less reactive and restrictive response to the COVID-19 pandemic.

== Death ==
Wecht died at his home in Pittsburgh on May 13, 2024, at the age of 93.

== In popular media ==
Wecht was portrayed by Albert Brooks in the 2015 film Concussion. In the film, Wecht was a staunch supporter of Bennet Omalu's efforts to expose the link between concussions and football.

== Selected publications ==
- Introduction to Groden, Robert J. (1995). The Search for Lee Harvey Oswald: The Comprehensive Photographic Record. Viking Penguin. ISBN 978-0670858675.
- Foreword to H. L. Hunt: Motive & Opportunity by John Curington and Michael Whitington. 23 House (2018). ISBN 978-1939306241.

Political offices
Preceded by Himself; As County Coroner	Allegheny County Medical Examiner; 2005–2006	Succeeded by Abdulrezak Shakir^{1} Acting
Preceded by F. James Gregis^{2} Acting	Allegheny County Coroner; 1996–2005	Succeeded by Office Eliminated
Preceded by Jim Flaherty	Member of the Allegheny County Board of Commissioners; 1980–1984	Succeeded by Pete Flaherty
Preceded by Ralph Stalter	Allegheny County Coroner; 1970–1980	Succeeded by Joshua Perper^{3} Acting
Party political offices
Preceded by Bill Green	Democratic nominee for U.S. Senator from Pennsylvania (Class 1); 1982	Succeeded by Joe Vignola
Preceded by Eugene Coon	Chairperson of the Allegheny County Democratic Party; 1978–1984	Succeeded by Ed Stevens
Notes and references
1. Shakir held the title of Acting Medical Examiner while a national search was undertaken to find a permanent successor to Wecht. In December 2006, Karl Williams was formally appointed Medical Examiner.; 2. Gregis held the title of Acting Coroner from the date of Joshua Perper's resignation in July 1994, until Wecht was elected to permanently fill the vancancy.; 3. Perper held the title of Acting Coroner from the date of Wecht's resignation, until the State Supreme Court upheld Dr. Sanford Edberg's appointment to the office on March 2, 1981
