= List of Unsolved History episodes =

This article is a list of episodes of documentary television series Unsolved History.

== Episodes ==
=== Season 1 ===
1. Gettysburg: Pickett's Charge
2. The Death of the U.S.S. Maine
3. Inside Hitler's Bunker
4. Forensics in the White House
5. Custer's Last Stand
6. The Alamo
7. The Iceman Mystery
8. Pearl Harbor: Death of the Arizona
9. The Death of the Red Baron (produced by Termite Art Productions) – concluded that the legendary German air ace Rittmeister Manfred von Richthofen was killed by Gunner W. J. "Snowy" Evans of the 53rd Australian Field Artillery Battery. However, some other sources suggest that the fatal shot was fired by Sgt Cedric Popkin of the 24th Australian Machine Gun Company.
10. Shoot-Out at the O.K. Corral
11. The Boston Massacre
12. JFK: Death in Dealey Plaza (produced by Termite Art Productions)
13. The Roman Colosseum
14. Wilhelm Gustloff: World's Deadliest Sea Disaster
15. Who Killed Julius Caesar?
16. The Assassination of King Tut
17. Escapes from Alcatraz
18. JFK: Altered Statesman
19. Death of Princess Diana
20. San Francisco's Earthquake of 1906

=== Season 2 ===
1. Death of Marilyn Monroe
2. Roswell: Flying Saucers Over America
3. Salem Witch Trials
4. JFK: The Conspiracy Myths
5. The Saint Valentine's Day Massacre
6. Aztec Temple of Blood
7. Myths of Pearl Harbor
8. The Plots to Kill Lincoln
9. Nostradamus
10. The Great Chicago Fire
11. Jack the Ripper
12. Killing Hitler – Re-created various scenarios of the July 20 plot
13. Robert F. Kennedy Assassination
14. Hunting Nazis – After World War II almost 30,000 war criminals escaped from Europe. Was Mengele part of a Fourth Reich dedicated to evil plots to restore Nazi power? The truth is that Mengele, like many ex-Nazis, led a pathetic hunted animal existence after the war. Features archeologist Clyde Snow.
15. The Trojan Horse
16. Suicide Bombers
17. Ninjas
18. Flight KAL-007
19. History Of The Ninja
20. In Search Of D. B. Cooper
21. Butch and Sundance – The controversy surrounding Butch Cassidy and the Sundance Kid has raged since the famous shootout in Bolivia in 1908. Travel to San Vicente, Bolivia, to investigate the rumors that these outlaws survived the ambush and returned to the United States.
22. The Bermuda Triangle

=== Season 3 ===
1. American P.I.: The Case of O.J. Simpson
2. JFK: Beyond the Magic Bullet
3. American P.I.: The Son of Sam Case - In 1977, the NYPD arrested David Berkowitz for a string of shootings that terrorized New York City. Examine the Son of Sam murders to find out whether Berkowitz acted alone or as part of a satanic cult.
4. The Hope Diamond
5. Area 51 - Northwest of Las Vegas lies a mysterious place known as Area 51. Although the U.S. government denies its existence, Area 51 has become part of pop culture, inspiring films, books and TV. Explore the cloak of secrecy that surrounds this military base. Researchers: Nick Cook, James Goodall, Stan Gordon, Daniel Martinez.
6. Unstoppable Wave - The 2004 Indian Ocean earthquake and tsunami
7. The Lost Colony
8. JFK: Inside the Target Car
9. JFK: The Ruby Connection
10. The Donner Party
