= Joshua Perper =

American medical examiner (1932–2021)

Broward County Chief Medical Examiner
- In office July 1, 1994 – October 30, 2011
- Preceded by: Ron Wright
- Succeeded by: Darin Trelka (Acting)

Allegheny County Coroner
- In office January 4, 1982 – July 1, 1994
- Preceded by: Sanford Edberg
- Succeeded by: F. James Gregis (Acting)^{[a]}

Allegheny County Coroner Acting
- In office January 9, 1980 – March 2, 1981
- Preceded by: Cyril Wecht
- Succeeded by: Sanford Edberg

Personal details
- Born: December 17, 1932 Bacău, Romania
- Died: July 12, 2021 (aged 88) Boca Raton, Florida, U.S.
- Party: Democratic
- Spouse: Sheila
- Education: Hebrew University of Jerusalem; Johns Hopkins University
- Occupation: Forensic pathologist Toxicologist
- a.Gregis held the title of Acting Coroner from the date of Perper's resignation in July 1994, until Cyril Wecht was elected to permanently fill the vacancy.

Joshua Perper (December 17, 1932 – July 12, 2021) was an American forensic pathologist and toxicologist. He served as the Chief Medical Examiner of Broward County, Florida for seventeen years, during which time he conducted autopsies on a number of famous individuals, including Anna Nicole Smith. Prior to his appointment to that position, he served as Allegheny County's Coroner serving metro Pittsburgh.

== Early life and professional career ==
Perper was born in Bacău, Romania. Being Jewish, he escaped the Nazis during World War II and, following the war, the Russians. At the age of 18, he moved to Israel, graduating from the Hebrew University of Jerusalem Faculty of Medicine (medical school) in 1960 and Faculty of Law (law school) in 1966. In 1969, he finished post graduate studies in forensic pathology at Johns Hopkins University. He served as Associate Medical Examiner, Senior Research Fellow and then Chief Medical Examiner in Baltimore, Maryland from 1969 to 1971. Between 1971 and 1994, while living in Pittsburgh, Pennsylvania, Perper was a toxicologist and then Chief Forensic Pathologist in the Allegheny County Coroner's Office (now called the Medical Examiner's Office), serving under Cyril Wecht.

== Allegheny County Coroner ==
In 1980, Wecht was elected to the Allegheny County Board of Commissioners. Wecht did not resign as Coroner until January 9, two days after his swearing-in as Commissioner, as the law did not prohibit him from holding both the offices of Coroner and Commissioner. He resigned under pressure from a variety of sources, including his predecessor as coroner, Ralph Stalter, a Republican, and the administration of Governor Dick Thornburgh, also a Republican. Wecht initially recommended that Perper succeed him, and indeed Perper held the title of Acting Coroner until Thornburgh appointed Sanford Edburg to succeed Wecht. While Perper initially rejected the appointment as unconstitutional, the State Supreme Court upheld Thornburgh's right to appoint Edberg, who duly took over the office of Coroner on March 2, 1981. The transition was not met without a brief physical altercation between the two men. Perper would return to the Coroner's office in January 1982, after he defeated Edberg in the fall 1981 general election.

=== Los Angeles County Medical Examiner appointment ===
In February 1991, the Los Angeles County Board of Supervisors voted unanimously to name Perper the County's new Chief Medical Examiner. While Perper initially accepted the posting, he backed-out of the job two months before he was to begin his duties. Perper cited a variety of reasons behind his decision, including the economic–media reports which indicated Perper and his wife, a real estate agent, believed they could not afford the kind of home to which they had become accustomed—and the emotional—Perper's wife also did not want to leave behind the couple's friends.

He would therefore remain Allegheny County Coroner for another three years.

== Broward County Chief Medical Examiner ==
Perper did resign as Allegheny County Coroner in 1994, after he was appointed Chief Medical Examiner of Broward County, Florida by Governor Lawton Chiles.

=== Notable autopsies ===
==== Krissy Taylor ====
Perper performed the autopsy on Krissy Taylor, the 17-year-old model who died of bronchial asthma in 1995, after collapsing in her parents' home. Krissy was the younger sister of model Niki Taylor.

==== Steve Bechler ====
Perper performed the autopsy of Steve Bechler after the pitcher's death on February 17, 2003. According to Perper: "It is my professional opinion that the toxicity of ephedra played a significant role in the death of Mr. Bechler, although it's impossible to define mathematically the contribution of each one of the factors in his unfortunate death due to heatstroke."

During the investigation Perper interviewed Bechler's family. He found that Bechler was overweight, out of shape, was not yet accustomed to the warm and humid weather in South Florida, was on a primarily liquid or semi-liquid diet, did not feel well or eat the night before he collapsed and had high blood pressure, was using Xenadrine and had abnormal liver functions.

==== Anna Nicole Smith ====
Perper oversaw as Gertrude M. Juste and Stephen Cina examined and autopsied the body of Anna Nicole Smith in 2007. He also had significant involvement in the hearing deciding the fate of her body and has made numerous TV appearances on Nancy Grace and various other shows in relation to this. Perper revealed his findings that Smith's death was due to an accidental lethal combination of therapeutic levels of 3 benzodiazepines and chloral hydrate. Chloral hydrate was believed to be the major contributing factor. An infection in her left buttock was also a contributory factor. After reviewing evidence in collaboration with legal authorities, he judged the death "accidental" and not suicide or homicide, or death by natural causes.

==== Bernice Novack ====
The autopsy of Bernice Novack [widow of Fountainbleau Hotel owner Ben Novack Sr.] in 2009 was one of his worst cases, and damaged his reputation a great deal. Initially Perper opined her death to be accidental as a result of a slip and fall. Three months later, evidence gathered that her daughter-in-law Narcy Novack had in fact murdered her. In the face of new evidence [gathered by police; not by him], he promptly reclassified Bernice's death as a homicide.

=== Retirement ===
In September 2011, Governor Rick Scott announced he would not reappoint Perper to another three-year term as Chief Medical Examiner. No reason was given officially, but it is possible, it was due to his botching up of Novack's autopsy. Additionally, in 2011, his 49-year-old son, Dr. Zvi Harry Perper, was arrested and charged with racketeering and drug trafficking. However, Perper expressed surprise at the decision, and subsequently announced his intention to resign at the end of October of that year, and enter retirement.

He died on July 12, 2021.

== See also ==
- Microscopic Diagnosis in Forensic Pathology ISBN 0398039690
- When to...CALL THE DOCTOR! Your A–Z Guide to Illness, Injury and Today's Medicine ISBN 1883527112
- Self-assessment of current knowledge in forensic pathology and legal medicine: 1,100 multiple choice questions and referenced answers ISBN 0874881781

Political offices
Preceded by Ron Wright	Broward County Chief Medical Examiner; 1994–2011	Succeeded by Darin Trelka; Acting
Preceded by Sanford Edberg	Allegheny County Coroner; 1982–1994	Succeeded by F. James Gregis^{1} Acting
Preceded by Cyril Wecht	Allegheny County Coroner; Acting; 1980–1981	Succeeded by Sanford Edberg
Notes and references
1. Gregis held the title of Acting Coroner from the date of Perper's resignation in July 1994, until Cyril Wecht was elected to permanently fill the vacancy.
