= Henry I. Gourley =

American politician (1838–1899)

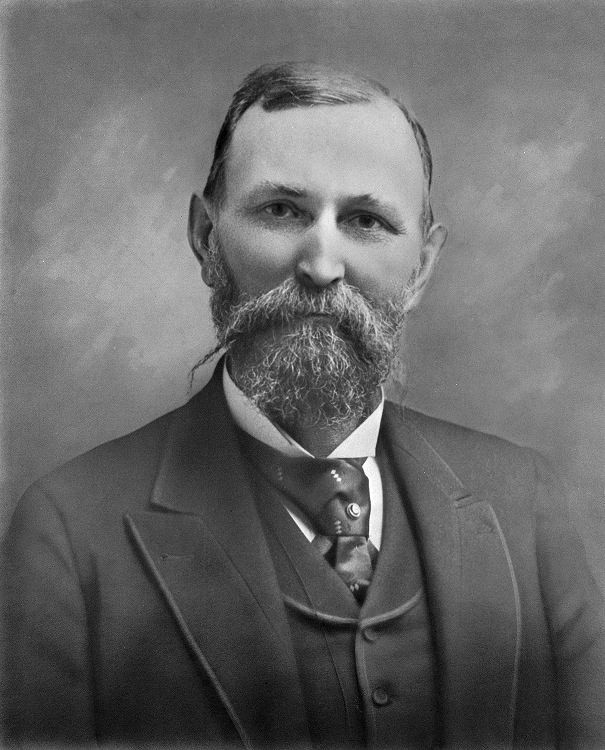
- Portrait of Henry I. Gourley, c. 1890–1893

35th Mayor of Pittsburgh
- In office 1890–1893
- Preceded by: William McCallin
- Succeeded by: Bernard J. McKenna

Personal details
- Born: Henry Irvin Gourley; October 3, 1838 Juniata County, Pennsylvania, US
- Died: May 27, 1899 (aged 60)
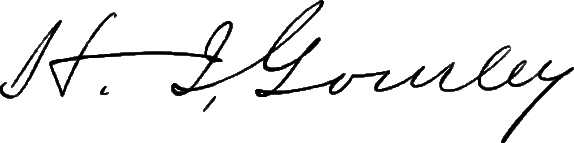
- Signature

Henry Irvin Gourley (October 3, 1838 – May 27, 1899) was an American politician. He served as Mayor of Pittsburgh from 1890 to 1893.

== Biography ==
Gourley was born in Juniata County, Pennsylvania in 1838 to a peasant family. As a child, he was sent early in life to a farm in Pine Township, Allegheny County, Pennsylvania. There, he became a schoolteacher.

In 1876, he was elected to the City Council. Mayor Gourley took office in 1890 and his reputation for hard and honest work served him well in city hall. His term was noted for the trust it engendered in Pittsburgh residents. After he left office he served as city controller before his death on May 27, 1899, aged 60. He is buried in Homewood Cemetery.

Political offices
Preceded by William McCallin	Mayor of Pittsburgh; 1890–1893	Succeeded by Bernard J. McKenna
