= Badge of the Assassin =

1985 film

- Original film poster
- Genre: Crime; Thriller
- Based on: Badge of the Assassin by Robert K. Tanenbaum; Philip Rosenberg
- Screenplay by: Lawrence Roman
- Directed by: Mel Damski
- Starring: James Woods; Yaphet Kotto; Alex Rocco; David Harris; Steven Keats; Larry Riley; Kene Holliday; Pam Grier; Rae Dawn Chong; Richard Bradford
- Theme music composer: Tom Scott
- Country of origin: United States
- Original language: English

Production
- Executive producers: Daniel H. Blatt; Robert Singer; Robert K. Tanenbaum
- Cinematography: John Lindley
- Editor: Andrew L. Cohen
- Running time: 96 minutes
- Production company: Blatt-Singer Productions

Original release
- Network: CBS
- Release: November 2, 1985

Badge of the Assassin is a 1985 television film starring James Woods, Yaphet Kotto and Alex Rocco. It was directed by Mel Damski. The film first aired on the Columbia Broadcasting System network on November 2, 1985. The film's production company was Blatt-Singer Productions.

== Plot ==
Three black revolutionaries (Anthony Bottom, Albert "Nuh" Washington, and Herman Bell) gun down two New York City police officers. The self-styled terrorists elude the law and conviction for their crime. Assistant District Attorney, Robert Tanenbaum, the man responsible for bringing the three killers to justice, leads a tireless nationwide investigation that moves to San Francisco, New Orleans and Mississippi and finally back to a climax in a New York City courtroom. Tanenbaum is aided by his partner, a resourceful and equally determined detective, Cliff Fenton.

== Cast ==
- James Woods as Robert K. Tanenbaum, Assistant District Attorney
- Yaphet Kotto as Detective Cliff Fenton NYPD
- Alex Rocco as Detective Bill Butler NYPD
- David Harris as Lester Bertram Day
- Steven Keats as Harold Skelton, Defense Attorney
- Larry Riley as Herman Bell
- Pam Grier as Alexandra 'Alie' Horn
- Rae Dawn Chong as Christine Horn
- Richard Bradford as L.J. Delsa
- Kene Holliday as Albert Washington
- Toni Kalem as Diane Piagentini
- Tamu Blackwell as Gloria Lapp
- Richard Brooks as Anthony 'Tony' Bottom
- Akosua Busia as Ruth
- Lewis Arquette as Foreman #1
- Alan Blumenfeld as Charlie
- Ernie Lively as U.S. Marshal
- Ray Girardin as FBI Agent King
- David Wohl as Ken Klein
- Kelly Jo Minter as Rachel Torres
- Noble Willingham as Airport Guard
- Paul Perri as Joseph Piagentini
- Henry G. Sanders as Foreman #2
- Miguel Sandoval as Francisco Torres
- John Brandon as Court Clerk #2

== Production ==
Based on the true story that took place in Harlem during 1971, the telefilm, Badge of the Assassin, is based on the 1979 book of the same name – a true-crime account from the former district attorney and New York Times bestselling author Robert K. Tanenbaum and Philip Rosenberg. Woods played Tanenbaum in the film, whilst Tanenbaum was a co-executive producer. Writer Lawrence Roman transferred the book into a script for a television film. The film is an account of the detective work and prosecution that resulted in the convictions in 1975 of the Black Liberation Army members who, four years earlier, had shot to death two New York City police officers, Waverly Jones and Joseph Piagentini, in an unprovoked attack.

== Reception ==
Sandra Brennan of Allmovie gave the film three out of five stars. Digiguide.tv gave the film three out of five stars. In the Blockbuster Video Guide to Movies and Videos, 1996, published by Dell Pub. on 1 August 1995, the film was given a four out of five star rating.

On November 1, 1985, the New York Times writer Lawrence Van Gelder reviewed the film under the article headline "Police Murders Dramatized in Badge of the Assassin", where he stated "On screen, Mr. Tanenbaum, who pursued the case through two trials -the first ending in a hung jury, the second in murder convictions - is portrayed with a nice mixture of intensity, warmth, subdued humor and occasional self-doubt by James Woods. He is well supported by Yaphet Kotto and Alex Rocco as the New York detectives assigned to the case, and the cast also includes Rae Dawn Chong and Pam Grier as women associated with the killers. Badge of the Assassin wastes no time on subplots, nor does it exaggerate its intrinsic drama; neither does it seek to appraise or analyze from the vantage point of the 1980's the racial rage that was a characteristic of the time that produced the murders. Perhaps the fact that the case is revisited nearly 15 years later as typical television entertainment for a Saturday night is comment enough."

In The Pittsburgh Press of November 1, 1985, writer Barbara Holsopple stated "Badge of the Assassin is well-written, performed and produced, but it lacks the tension, suspense and horror of its era. Performers can't reproduce that, Yaphet Kotto said, if nobody remembers."

As quoted on the film's original publicity poster and VHS release, Leonard of Entertainment Tonight said "Bristling police drama about real life... played with nervous intensity by James Woods."

The Stop Button webzine reviewed the film in 2007, and stated "Mel Damski, if Badge of the Assassin is any indication, might be the finest TV movie director ever (who never went on to good theatrical films anyway). He understands composition, camera movement, editing–how to let actors do what actors do–beautifully. Badge of the Assassin looks like a TV movie and that description is, thanks in large part to Damski, not at all a pejorative. Admittedly, he has a lot of help. The film's perfectly as cast, top to bottom. Alex Rocco, Larry Riley, Richard Bradford, all three are particularly good, but there are no bad performances. David Harris is real good too. But the film really belongs to Yaphet Kotto. Even though James Woods gets a lot to do, he never gets as much to do as Kotto... and he doesn't get to do it as long. Regardless of what a terrible film McQ is... screenwriter Lawrence Roman is of a definite pedigree and his influence is probably significant. The script is another area Badge really makes a model TV movie. The character content, which is considerable–scenes with Rocco, Woods and Kotto all have a lot of weight–occurs over a really long time. Adding to the film is the location shooting. It helps immensely, forcing the viewer to engage with the reality of what's on the screen in front of him or her. In the end, Badge of the Assassin sort of runs out of time. It doesn't run out of story so much as it runs out of scenes it can enact well. It's a good looking film, though, with some great acting."

== Home media ==
The film was released in America and the UK, and has never received a DVD release. In the UK it was released onto VHS with an exclusive artwork. In America, the film has received a number of VHS releases. On August 10, 1992, the film was released on VHS via Anchor Bay, whilst in 1993 and again in 1998, Lions Gate Home Entertainment released the film on VHS again. In 1995, it was also issued on VHS by Vidmark Entertainment. All releases featured the same artwork as the original movie poster. The film was also issued on Laserdisc.
