= 1982 United States Senate election in Pennsylvania =

- November 2, 1982
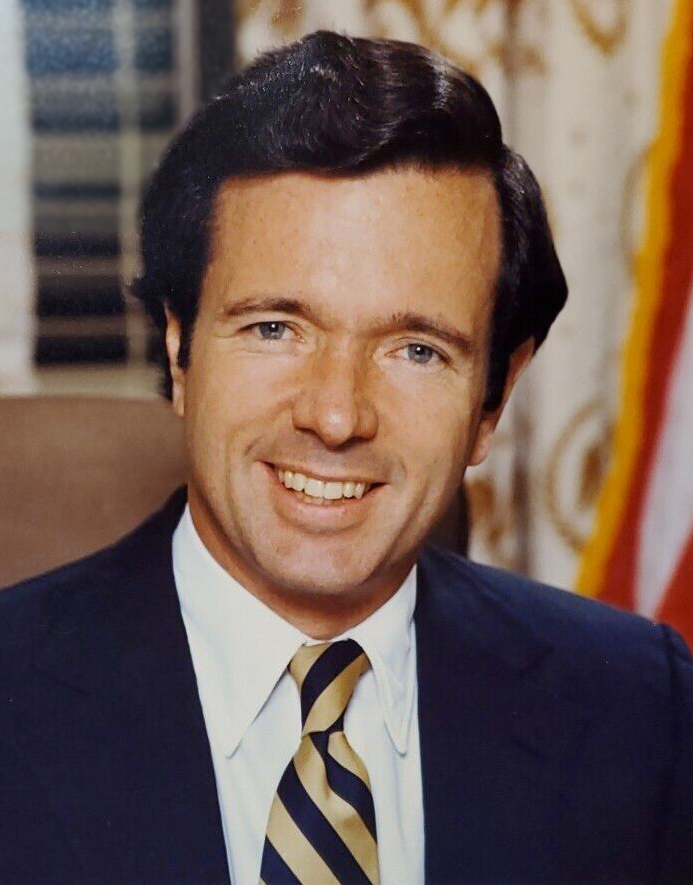

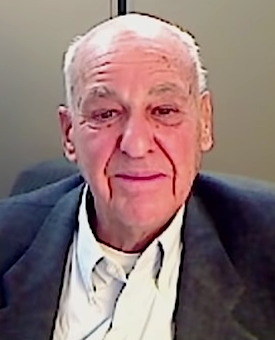
Nominee	John Heinz	Cyril Wecht
Party	Republican	Democratic
Popular vote	2,136,418	1,412,965
Percentage	59.28%	39.20%
- County results Heinz: 50–60% 60–70% 70–80% Wecht: 50–60% 60–70%
U.S. senator before election
John Heinz
Republican
Elected U.S. Senator
John Heinz
Republican

The 1982 United States Senate election in Pennsylvania was held on November 2, 1982. Incumbent Republican U.S. Senator John Heinz successfully sought re-election to another term, defeating Democratic nominee Cyril Wecht.

== General election ==
=== Candidates ===
- H. John Heinz III, incumbent U.S. Senator (Republican)
- Barbara I. Karkutt (Libertarian)
- Liane Norman (Consumer)
- William H. Thomas (Socialist Workers)
- Cyril Wecht, member of the Allegheny County Board of Commissioners (Democratic)

=== Campaign ===
John Heinz's Democratic opponent in the 1982 election was Allegheny County commissioner and former coroner Cyril Wecht, who lacked significant name recognition outside of Pittsburgh, his home town. Although the 1982 elections were a setback nationally for incumbent President Ronald Reagan and the Republican Party, neither Heinz nor incumbent Republican governor Dick Thornburgh, who was also up for re-election in 1982, were challenged by Democrats with statewide prominence.

Wecht ran a low-budget campaign, lacking the assets to boost his name recognition; The Philadelphia Inquirer ran a headline dubbing the contest, "The Race for Senator No One Seemed to Notice."

Despite this, Heinz ran a cautious campaign, running as a moderate due to Pennsylvania's unemployment, 11%, one of the highest in the nation at the time, as well as the declining health of Pennsylvania's coal mining, manufacturing and steel industries. In the end, Heinz won the election by a wide margin, winning 59.3% of the popular vote. Wecht won 39.2% of the popular vote.

=== Results ===
General election results
Party	Candidate	Votes	%	±%
Republican	H. John Heinz III (Incumbent)	2,136,418	59.28%	+6.89%
Democratic	Cyril Wecht	1,412,965	39.20%	−7.59%
Libertarian	Barbara I. Karkutt	19,244	0.53%	+0.53%
Socialist Workers	William H. Thomas	18,951	0.53%	+0.41%
Consumer	Liane Norman	16,530	0.46%	+0.46%
Majority		723,453	20.08%	+14.48%
Total votes		3,604,108	100.00%	
Republican hold		Swing		

== See also ==
- 1982 United States Senate elections
