= William McCallin =

American politician (1842–1904)

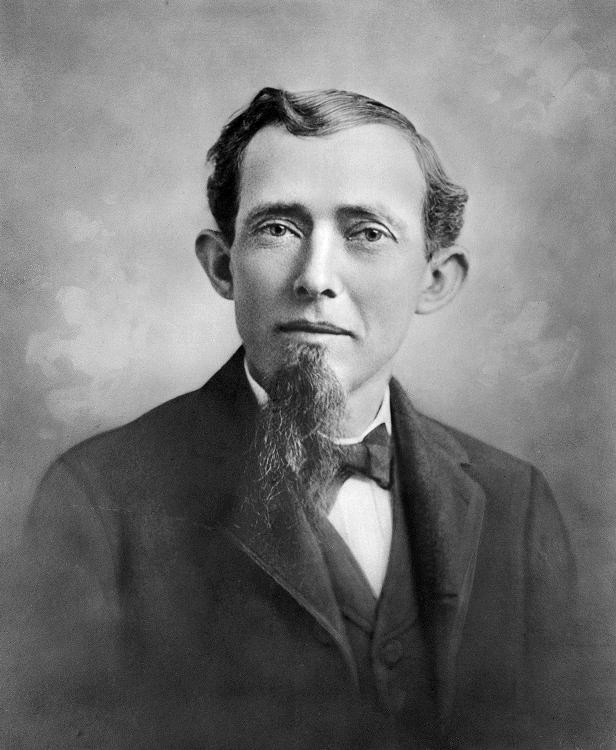
- Portrait of William McCallin, c. 1887–1890

34th Mayor of Pittsburgh
- In office 1887–1890
- Preceded by: Andrew Fulton
- Succeeded by: Henry I. Gourley

Personal details
- Born: August 8, 1842
- Died: September 4, 1904 (aged 62)

William McCallin (August 8, 1842 – September 4, 1904) was Mayor of Pittsburgh, Pennsylvania, from 1887 to 1890.

== Early life ==
Mayor McCallin was born in Mercer County, Pennsylvania north of Pittsburgh in 1842 into a livery family.

== Pittsburgh politics ==
He was successful in elections to County Coroner and Allegheny County Sheriff in 1881. After his service as Sheriff he ran successfully for Pittsburgh mayor. During his term in office he led the charge for prolific construction of critical infrastructure that the rapidly developing city required to be successful. He oversaw the opening of Schenley Park in 1889. Pittsburgh's industrial might was displayed for the world during McCallin's reign as mayor when the first mold of aluminum was cast in the city.

McCallin died in 1904 of dropsy and was buried in Homewood Cemetery.

Political offices
Preceded by Andrew Fulton	Mayor of Pittsburgh; 1887–1890	Succeeded by Henry I. Gourley
