= Robert K. Tanenbaum =

American novelist (1942–2026)

- Born: December 17, 1942; New York City, U.S.
- Died: January 3, 2026 (aged 83)
- Education: University of California, Berkeley
- Occupations: Attorney; politician; novelist
- Spouse: Patti Tyre Tanenbaum (m. 1967)
- Children: 3
- Relatives: Michael Gruber (cousin)

Robert Karl Tanenbaum (December 17, 1942 – January 3, 2026) was an American trial attorney and novelist who was the mayor of Beverly Hills, California.

== Early life and education ==
Robert Karl Tanenbaum was born in Brooklyn, New York, on December 17, 1942. He attended the University of California, Berkeley on a basketball scholarship where he earned a B.A. Tanenbaum received his J.D. from Boalt Hall School of Law at the University of California, Berkeley.

== Legal career ==
Under the leadership of District Attorney Frank Hogan, Tanenbaum learned about trial preparedness and presenting evidence to a jury as an Assistant New York County District Attorney in Manhattan. Later, Tanenbaum became head of the Homicide Bureau, served as Chief of the Criminal Courts, and was in charge of the D.A.'s legal staff training program. During his time in the D.A.'s office, Tanenbaum never lost a felony case.

After his tenure in Manhattan's D.A.'s office, Tanenbaum served as Deputy Chief Counsel for the House Select Committee on Assassinations to investigate the John F. Kennedy assassination and the Martin Luther King Jr. assassination. He later resigned from the post shortly after being named. In 1988 he appeared in the documentary The Men Who Killed Kennedy and on 17 September 1996 he testified at a public hearing of the Assassination Records Review Board in Los Angeles. He wrote the introduction to Mark Lane's 2011 book Last Word: My Indictment of the CIA in the Murder of JFK. He was interviewed for the 2023 documentary JFK: What the Doctors Saw. In 2025 he published the book That Day in Dallas, featuring an introduction by Robert J. Groden.

In private practice, he was a special prosecution consultant on the Hillside Strangler case in Los Angeles; defended Amy Grossberg in her sensationalized baby death case; and represented eight black plaintiffs in a significant racial profiling case against the Beverly Hills Police Department.

He taught Advanced Criminal Procedure for four years at Boalt Hall School of Law at the University of California, Berkeley. He conducts continuing legal education seminars for practicing lawyers in California, New York and Pennsylvania. He was a member of the State Bars of New York, Pennsylvania and California.

== Political career ==
Tanenbaum served two terms as Mayor of Beverly Hills and was a City Councilmember for eight years, from 1986 to 1994. He ran unsuccessfully for Los Angeles County District Attorney in 1992. He was defeated for re-election to the City Council in 1994. He also ran D.A. Frank Hogan's re-election campaign for District Attorney in 1973.

== Literary career ==
His byline appears on 33 books; 29 novels and 4 nonfiction works. His cousin Michael Gruber was the ghostwriter of the first part of the popular Butch Karp -Marlene Ciampi series of novels, starting with No Lesser Plea and ending with Resolved. After the partnership with Tanenbaum ended, Gruber began publishing novels using his own name.

Tanenbaum's The Piano Teacher , co-written with Peter S. Greenberg, is the true story of a psychotic killer, Badge of the Assassin recalls the true account of Tanenbaum's investigation and trial of self-proclaimed members of the Black Liberation Army who assassinated two NYPD police officers, Waverly Jones and Joseph Piagentini. It was later adapted into a movie titled Badge of the Assassin, starring James Woods as Tanenbaum.

Tanenbaum's signature work, Echoes of My Soul was published in May 2013 by Kensington Books and was named 'Pick of the Week' by Publishers Weekly in its April 22, 2013 edition. It is about Miranda v. Arizona, the United States Supreme Court decision that laid the groundwork for Miranda rights.

A later novel, Without Fear or Favor, was published by Simon & Schuster Gallery Books in August 2017.

== Death ==
Tanenbaum died from cancer on January 3, 2026, at the age of 83.

== Bibliography ==
=== Non-fiction ===
- (with Peter S. Greenberg) The Piano Teacher: The True Story of a Psychotic Killer. Gallery Books. 1987. ISBN 978-1501119255.
- (with Philip Rosenberg) Badge of the Assassin. E.P. Dutton. 1979. ISBN 978-0525060703. (1985 TV film adaption Badge of the Assassin)
- Introduction to Lane, Mark (2011). Last Word: My Indictment of the CIA in the Murder of JFK. Skyhorse Publishing. ISBN 978-1616084288.
- Introduction to Crenshaw, Charles A. (2013). JFK Has Been Shot. Pinnacle Books. ISBN 978-0786034284.
- Echoes of My Soul. Kensington Publishing Corp. 2013. ISBN 978-0758285355.
- (with Steve Jackson) Coal Country Killing: A Culture, a Union, and the Murders That Changed It All. Simon & Schuster. 2023. ISBN 978-1637588499.
- That Day in Dallas: Lee Harvey Oswald Did NOT Kill JFK. Regnery. 2025. ISBN 978-1510783669. Introduction by Robert J. Groden.

=== Fiction ===
- 1987: No Lesser Plea
- 1989: Depraved Indifference
- 1991: Immoral Certainty
- 1992: Reversible Error
- 1993: Material Witness
- 1994: Justice Denied
- 1994: Corruption of Blood
- 1996: Falsely Accused
- 1997: Irresistible Impulse
- 1998: Reckless Endangerment
- 1999: Act of Revenge
- 2000: True Justice
- 2001: Enemy Within
- 2002: Absolute Rage
- 2003: Resolved
- 2004: Hoax
- 2005: Fury
- 2006: Counterplay
- 2007: Malice
- 2008: Escape
- 2009: Capture
- 2010: Betrayed
- 2011: Outrage
- 2012: Bad Faith
- 2013: Tragic
- 2014: Fatal Conceit
- 2015: Trap
- 2016: Infamy
- 2017: Without Fear or Favor
