= Allegheny County Medical Examiner =

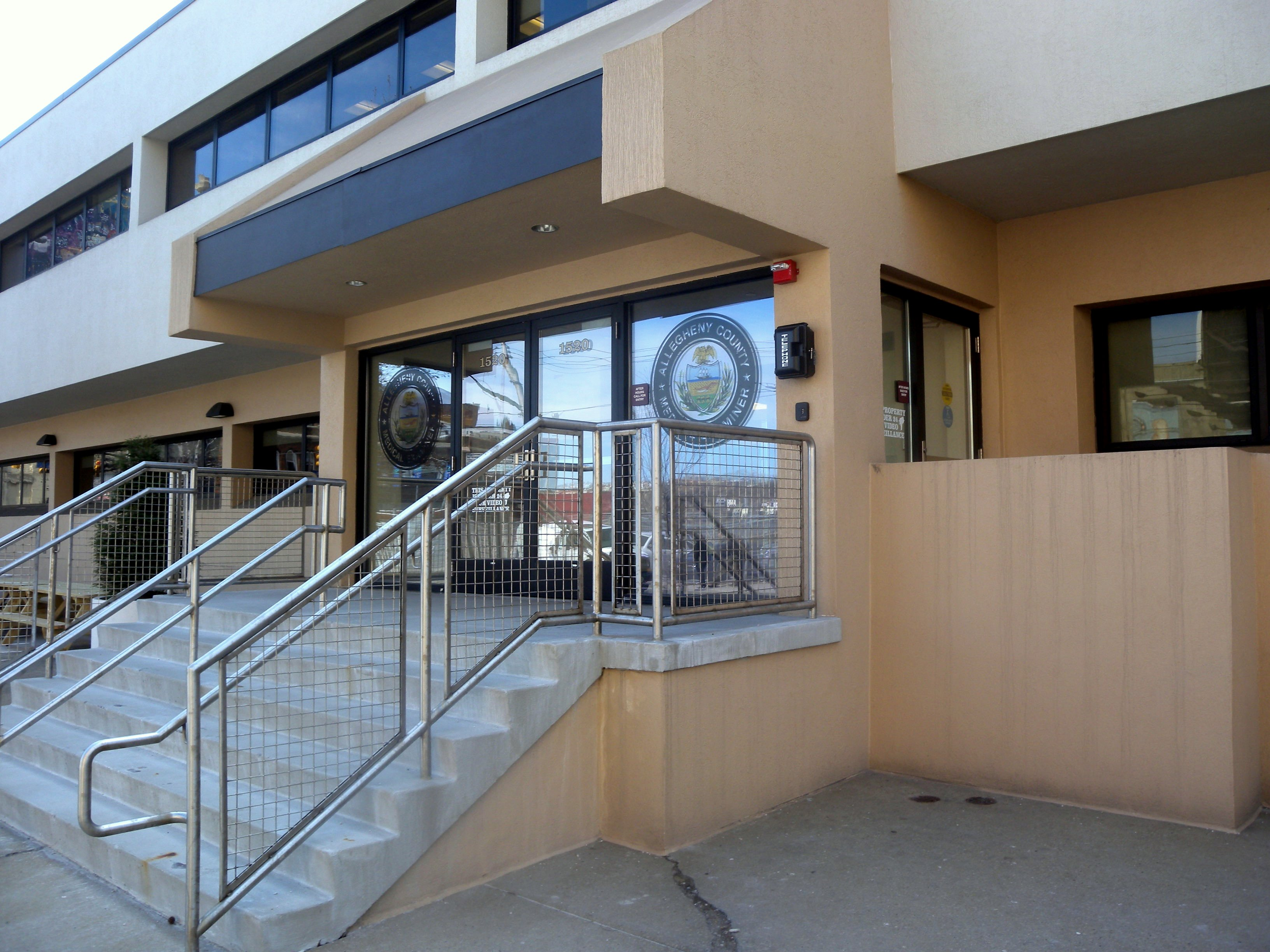
- Incumbent; Ashton Ennis (Interim) since September 17, 2026
- Appointer: Allegheny County Executive
- First holder: William McCallin
- Website: alleghenycounty.us/me/index.aspx

The Office of Allegheny County Medical Examiner investigates cases of persons who die within Allegheny County, Pennsylvania from criminal violence by casualty or by suicide, when unattended by a physician; under correctional custody or any other suspicious or unusual manner. The office's jurisdiction includes the city of Pittsburgh and its immediate suburbs.

Prior to 2005 the Coroner was an elected position within the county, however on December 29, 2005 the position was abolished and retitled "Medical Examiner" with all future office holders being appointees of the Allegheny County Executive once approved by county council. Longtime coroner Cyril Wecht continued to serve as both the last coroner and first medical examiner.

The Medical Examiner's Office also houses the Forensic Laboratory Division for the county. The disciplines within the laboratory are Drug Chemistry, Environmental Health, Firearms/Toolmarks, Forensic Biology, Latent Prints, Mobile Crime Unit, Toxicology, and Trace Evidence.

The office made headlines in the 1930s in its investigations into some of the Mad Butcher Killings. In the 1950s the office (headed by William McClelland) was a leader in attempting to raise the driving age from 16 to 18. The 1970s had the office gaining national prominence as Dr. Cyril Wecht led several investigations into the John F. Kennedy assassination.

== History ==
The office, then known as the Coroner's office, was located at #6 Eighth Street in 1901.

The office has been headed by several notable coroners/medical examiners including:

- April 8, 2024 - September 17, 2026 Ariel Goldschmidt
- December 22, 2006 – February 9, 2024 Karl Williams
- January 20, 2006 - December 22, 2006 Abdulrezak Shakir
- January 1, 1996 - January 20, 2006 Cyril Wecht
- July 1, 1994 – January 1, 1996 F. James Gregis
- January 4, 1982 – July 1, 1994 Joshua Perper
- March 2, 1981 – January 4, 1982 Sanford Edberg
- January 9, 1980 – March 2, 1981 Joshua Perper
- January 2, 1970 - January 8, 1980 Cyril Wecht
- 1968-January 2, 1970 Ralph Stalter
- 1966-1968 William R. Hunt
- 1960-1966 Joseph B. Dobbs
- 1942-1960 William D. McClelland (candidate for governor in 1954)
- 1921-193? William J. McGregor
- 1904-1909? Joseph G. Armstrong
- Jan 1900 -1903 Jesse M. McGeary
- 1887-1899, Aug 1892 Heber McDowell
- Pre-1881 William McCallin
