= William J. Diehl =

American politician (1845–1929)

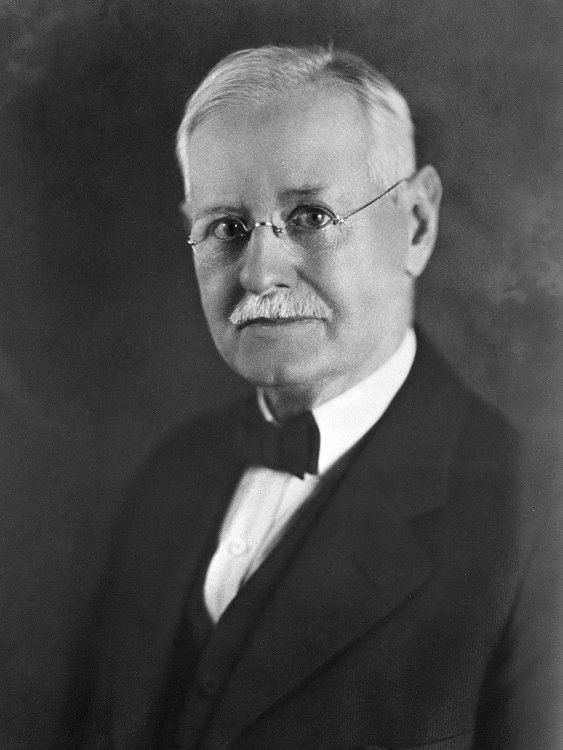
- Portrait of William J. Diehl, c. 1899–1901

38th Mayor of Pittsburgh
- In office April 3, 1899 – May 28, 1901
- Preceded by: Henry P. Ford
- Succeeded by: Adam M. Brown

Personal details
- Born: January 22, 1845 Pittsburgh
- Died: September 22, 1929 (aged 84)
- Party: Republican

William J. Diehl (January 22, 1845 – September 22, 1929), served as Mayor of Pittsburgh from 1899 to 1901.

== Early life ==
Diehl, born of German heritage in 1845, worked as a bookkeeper in his early career. He entered the public service as a Deputy Sheriff for four years followed by work in the city treasury office in the 1870s. His main fortune was in the oil and gas industries around the region and was President of the Wheeling Natural Gas Company in the 1880s. Diehl was also a thirty-third degree Mason. His great-grandfather was one of the organizers of the German Lutheran at the corner of Smithfield Street and Sixth Avenue.

== Pittsburgh politics ==
During his two years as mayor, Diehl oversaw a city growing to its full commercial and industrial potential. The ritzy and exclusive business forum Duquesne Club was founded in the city, as well as the amalgamation of Andrew Carnegie's vast industrial empire into U.S. Steel was completed. Mayor Diehl's administration successfully completed the rudimentary expressway Bigelow Boulevard to the east neighborhoods of the city.

Mayor Diehl died in 1929 and is buried in Allegheny Cemetery in Pittsburgh.

Political offices
Preceded by Henry P. Ford	Mayor of Pittsburgh; 1899–1901	Succeeded by Adam M. Brown
