= Robert J. Groden =

Kennedy assassination conspiracy theorist (born 1945)

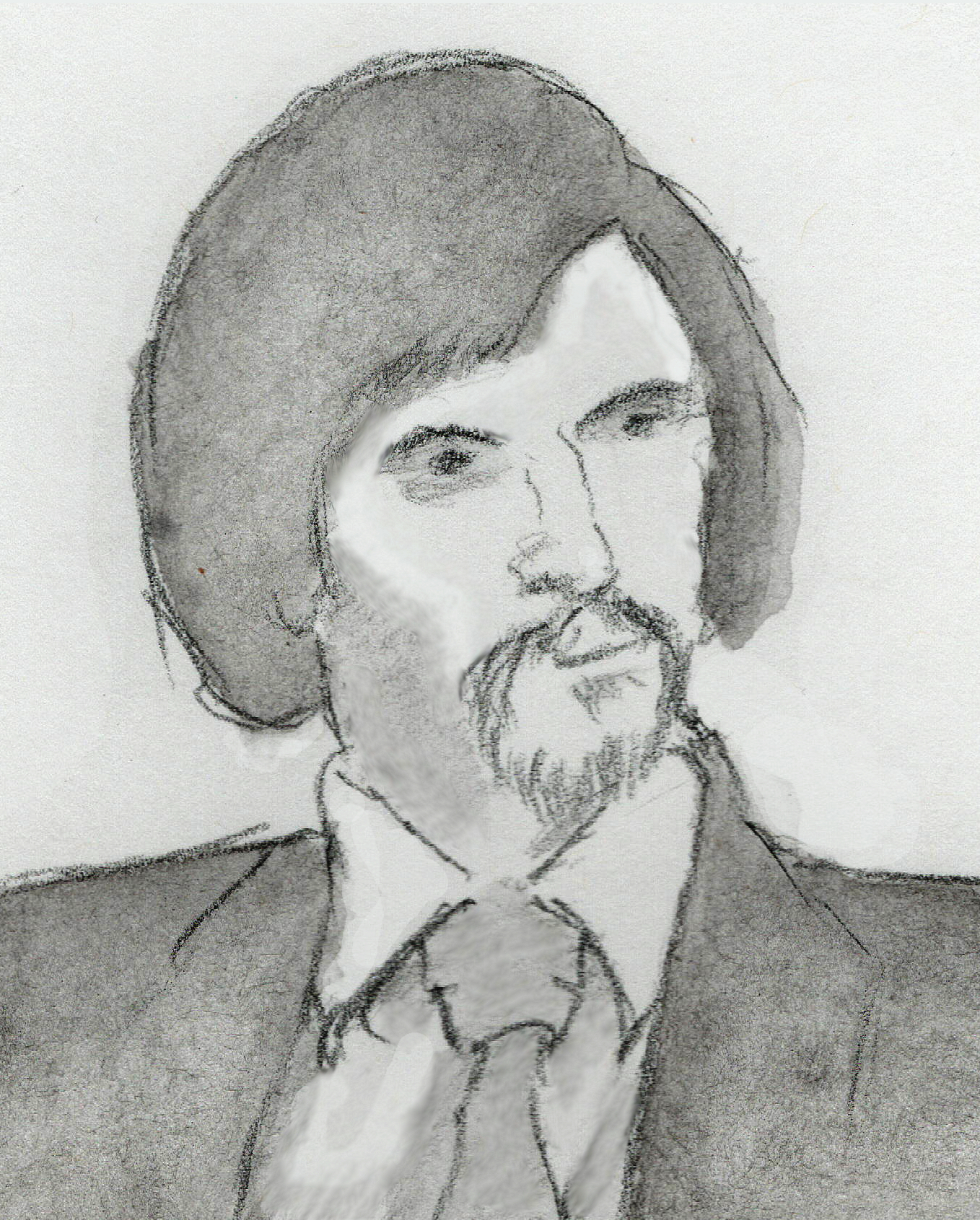
- Born: November 22, 1945 (age 80)
- Occupation: Author

Robert J. Groden (born November 22, 1945) is an American author who has written extensively about conspiracy theories regarding the assassination of U.S. President John F. Kennedy. His books include The Killing of a President: The Complete Photographic Record of the JFK Assassination, the Conspiracy, and the Cover-up; The Search for Lee Harvey Oswald: A Comprehensive Photographic Record; and JFK: The Case for Conspiracy (shorter version than his 1975 co-authored book). Groden is a photo-optics technician who served as a photographic consultant for the House Select Committee on Assassinations.

A harsh critic of the Warren Commission, he also testified at the 1975 United States President's Commission on CIA activities within the United States (sometimes referred to as the Rockefeller Commission).

== Early life and education ==
Groden attended Forest Hills High School in Queens, New York City, but left school in the 11th grade. He served in the Army starting in 1964, and first became interested in the assassination of John F. Kennedy that same year.

== Kennedy assassination and O.J. Simpson ==
After Groden returned from his Army tour in 1967, he became a photo technician working in a New York City motion picture processing lab; he had special expertise blowing up 8mm film for theatrical distribution. In 1969 the company did a large job processing film for the documentary Woodstock; and because of that work, it was awarded a contract from Life to work on the Zapruder film, the 27-second home movie captured by Abraham Zapruder of the Kennedy assassination. Groden worked on that project and made an additional unauthorized copy of the film, which he then kept hidden for several years, fearing not only the legal ramifications but also for his own life.

In 1973, Groden showed the film to a symposium of assassination researchers at Georgetown University in Washington, D.C.

In February 1975, Groden and Stephen Jaffe, an investigator for New Orleans District Attorney, Jim Garrison, testified before the Rockefeller Commission, chaired by Vice President Nelson Rockefeller, CIA activities related to the assassination of President Kennedy.

Groden achieved his first national exposure on March 6, 1975, when he and Dick Gregory were on Good Night America, a late-night TV program hosted by Geraldo Rivera, and they showed Groden's copy of the Zapruder film. This was the first time the film was shown in motion to a national TV audience. Later he served as a photographic consultant for the House Select Committee on Assassinations (HSCA). On 6 September 1978 he testified at a hearing of the HSCA on the photographic evidence relevant to the assassination.

In 1976 Groden co-authored, with F. Peter Model, the book JFK: The Case for Conspiracy. It featured an introduction by Congressman Thomas N. Downing and was re-released in 1977 as an expanded edition.

In the late 1980s, Groden was a consultant for Oliver Stone's 1991 film JFK, even appearing in two brief cameo roles: as a Parkland doctor working to save the President and as the courtroom projectionist showing the Zapruder film during the Clay Shaw trial in New Orleans.

In 1988 he made an appearance in the documentary The Men Who Killed Kennedy. In 1989 Groden co-authored with Harrison E. Livingstone the book High Treason: The Assassination of President John F. Kennedy & the Case for Conspiracy (also referred to as High Treason I). High Treason spent five weeks on the New York Times Best Seller list for paperback nonfiction. He served as a photographic specialist for the 1992 film Ruby, enhancing the quality of the archival footage the film utilises. He was an interviewee for the 1992 documentary The JFK Assassination: The Jim Garrison Tapes.

During the O.J. Simpson civil trial, Groden appeared as an expert witness and testified that a 1993 photograph of Simpson wearing Bruno Magli shoes at an NFL football game was a forgery. Even after 30 additional photos by a different photographer captured on the same day of Simpson wearing the same clothes and shoes surfaced, Groden still maintained that the original photograph was a forgery.

Groden sued Random House over a 1993 New York Times advertisement for Gerald Posner's book Case Closed in which Groden was featured along with other conspiracy theorists and declared "guilty of misleading the American public." The U.S. District Court issued a summary judgment and dismissed the case.

Groden has stated that his next book, JFK: Absolute Proof, documents his interview with a Dealey Plaza witness who was standing with Lee Harvey Oswald on the second floor of the Texas School Book Depository when they both heard shots being fired outside. Video documentaries he has released are JFK: The Case for Conspiracy: Assassination and Medical Evidence, The Assassination Films: The Case for Conspiracy, Volume II, and The Killing of a President: A Video Magazine. Groden penned the foreword to Robert K. Tanenbaum's 2025 book That Day in Dallas.

=== Free speech suits ===
As of September 2016 the city of Dallas had charged Groden with illegal activity 82 times related to his sharing information near the place of the Kennedy assassination. The court has found in favor of Groden in all of those lawsuits. One motivation for the city bringing the suits is a city planning effort to prevent anyone from encouraging visitors to recognize the site of the assassination as a tourist destination.

Groden was arrested in Dealey Plaza on June 13, 2010, and initially charged with selling magazines under a city ordinance that permits it. When that was pointed out, he was charged with violating an ordinance against selling merchandise in a city park without a permit; Dealey Plaza is under the control of Dallas' Parks and Recreation Department. In December 2010, the case was dismissed by a judge who agreed with Groden's defense that Dealey Plaza was not a city park and that the city neither offers nor requires permits to sell merchandise in parks; the city appealed.

Groden, whose lawyers said that he was arrested without probable cause and that his right to free speech was violated in the process, sued the City of Dallas for $900,000 in "mental anguish," $100,000 for damages to his reputation, and $1,000 for merchandise that was confiscated. In addition he sued certain police officers for violation of his constitutional rights. The City of Dallas filed a motion to dismiss which the court subsequently granted on the basis that Groden failed to adequately plead his case against the city. The suit against one of the police officers proceeded to trial.

On June 12, 2014, jurors deliberated for an hour and returned with a verdict stating that the arresting officer's actions did not violate Groden's constitutional rights. Groden's attorney claimed that the jury indicated they did not want to punish the officer for a crime committed by the city and asked why the city was not a defendant.

In October 2014, Groden filed a motion in the United States District Court for the Northern District of Texas requesting that the dismissal order be vacated and he be granted a new trial against both the City of Dallas and the police officer. The Court denied the motion by stating that Groden failed to remedy the early deficiencies in his claims against the City.

Groden successfully appealed the dismissal of his lawsuit against the City of Dallas. In June 2016, the United States Fifth Circuit Court of Appeals reversed the District Court's dismissal and remanded the case to continue against the city. Groden's Monell claim was allowed to be pursued. The Appeals Court permitted the police officer's ruling to stand.

== Authored Works ==
=== Books ===
- (with F. Peter Model) JFK : The Case For Conspiracy, Manor Books, 1977. ISBN 978-0532191070. Introduction of Congressman Thomas N. Downing.
- (with Harrison Edward Livingstone) High Treason: The Assassination of J.F.K. and the Case for Conspiracy, Berkley Books, 1993. ISBN 978-0425123447(provided the photographs; Livingstone wrote the text; Groden has often claimed sole authorship of the book; following a lawsuit, his name was taken off the book entirely).
- The Killing of a President: Complete Photographic Record of the JFK Assassination, Bloomsbury Publishing, 1993. ISBN 978-0747516217
- The Search for Lee Harvey Oswald: The Comprehensive Photographic Record, Viking/Allen Lane 1995. ISBN 978-0670858675 Introduction by Cyril Wecht.
- JFK: Absolute Proof: New Evidence of Conspiracy in the Assassination of President John F. Kennedy, Volume 3 of Killing of a President, Conspiracy Publications, 2013. ISBN 978-0-9849057-5-1

=== Other ===
- Introduction to Tanenbaum, Robert K. (2025). That Day in Dallas. Regnery. ISBN 978-1510783669.
