= Henry P. Ford =

American politician (1838–1905)

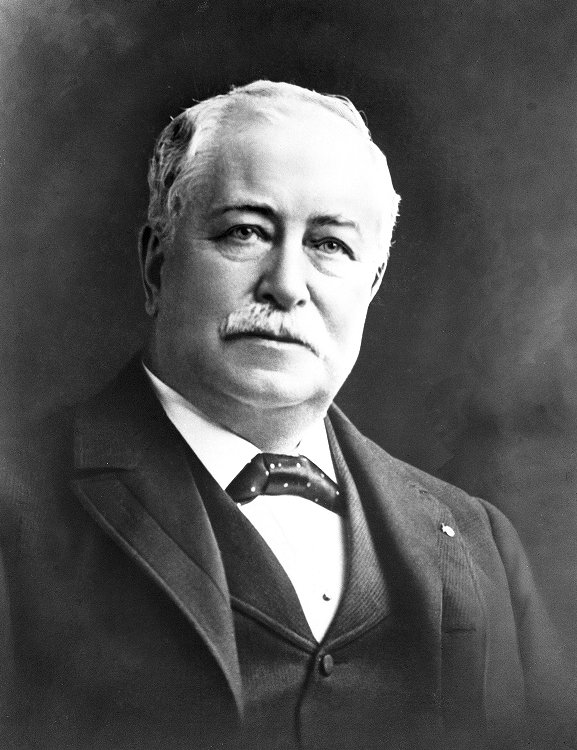
- Portrait of Henry P. Ford, c. 1896–1899

37th Mayor of Pittsburgh
- In office 1896–1899
- Preceded by: Bernard J. McKenna
- Succeeded by: William J. Diehl

Personal details
- Born: October 15, 1837
- Died: April 21, 1905 (aged 67)

Henry Parker Ford (October 15, 1837 – April 21, 1905) was mayor of Pittsburgh from 1896 to 1899.

== Early life ==
Henry Parker Ford was born in Hudson, New York, on October 15, 1837. He first worked as an accountant, experiencing much success in the trade. His skills in finance served him well in the expanding commercial center of Pittsburgh and led to his association in many industries in the city. He founded Emerson, Ford and Company, a manufacturing concern whose specialty was saw blades. In 1881, he was elected to city council.

== Pittsburgh politics ==
For a city that sometimes goes by the nickname "city of bridges" and claims to have more bridges than any other city outside of Venice, Italy, Mayor Ford was perfect. He was the founder of the city's department of bridges during his term. Ford also oversaw the creation of Pittsburgh Police Department's bicycle patrol in 1896, as well as the first water filtration in the city.

Ford died on April 21, 1905. He is buried in Homewood Cemetery on the city's east end.

Political offices
Preceded by Bernard J. McKenna	Mayor of Pittsburgh; 1896–1899	Succeeded by William J. Diehl
