= Michael Gruber (author) =

American author (born 1940)

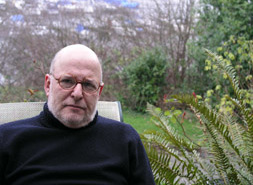
Gruber in his garden in Seattle, Washington

Michael Gruber (born October 1, 1940) is an American author.

Gruber was born in Brooklyn and currently lives in Seattle, Washington. He attended Columbia University and received his Ph.D. in biology from the University of Miami. He worked as a cook, a marine biologist, a speech writer, a policy advisor for the Jimmy Carter White House, and a bureaucrat for the United States Environmental Protection Agency (EPA) before becoming a novelist.

Gruber was the ghostwriter of the popular Robert K. Tanenbaum series of Butch Karp novels starting with No Lesser Plea and ending with Resolved. After the partnership with Tanenbaum ended, Gruber began publishing novels using his own name. The Book of Air and Shadows became a national bestseller shortly after its release in March 2007.

== Published works ==
=== Jimmy Paz ===
- Tropic of Night - The detective Jimmy Paz investigates a series of mysteries involving African sorcery in Miami. Themes explored include the nature of race, "magic," and the perceived illusions of reality. (2003)
- Valley of Bones - Jimmy Paz becomes intertwined with the life of a nun (Emmylou Dideroff) from a little-known Catholic order who is wrapped up in the Sudanese civil war. Themes include redemption and the mysteries of faith. (2005)
- Night of the Jaguar - Paz investigates a string of murders revolving around an Indian shaman from the Amazon rainforest and a guardian jaguar spirit. Environmental devastation, greed, and the failures of science to explain the unknown are some of the areas explored in the last novel of the Paz trilogy. (2006)

=== Standalone ===
- The Witch's Boy - Classical stories are revisited in this fantasy novel, as seen through the eyes of an ugly orphaned boy named Lump who is raised by a witch. Winner of the 2006 Scandiuzzi Children's Book Award for Middle Grades/Young Adults of the Washington State Book Awards.
- The Book of Air and Shadows - Letters found in a rare book set off a race to find an undiscovered Shakespeare play. The concept of "intellectual property" and the world of William Shakespeare are explored in this intricate thriller. (2007)
- Forgery of Venus (2008) - A novel about art forgery and time travel.
- The Good Son - A spy thriller that slides in and out of conventional identities with great facility. (2010)
- The Return (2013) - Aging Vietnam vet Marder ventures to Mexico with Skelly, a war buddy and elite soldier with ties to the underworld, in order to seek revenge for the murders that drove his wife to suicide.

== Ghost-written works for Robert K. Tanenbaum ==
- 1987 No Lesser Plea
- 1989 Depraved Indifference
- 1991 Immoral Certainty
- 1992 Reversible Error
- 1993 Material Witness
- 1994 Corruption of Blood
- 1994 Justice Denied
- 1996 Falsely Accused
- 1997 Irresistible Impulse
- 1998 Reckless Endangerment
- 1999 Act of Revenge
- 2000 True Justice
- 2001 Enemy Within
- 2002 Absolute Rage
- 2003 Resolved
