= Adam M. Brown =

American politician (1826–1910)

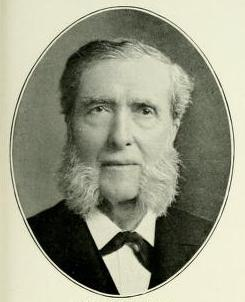
- Brown in 1901

39th Mayor of Pittsburgh
- In office May 1901 – November 1901
- Preceded by: William J. Diehl
- Succeeded by: Joseph O. Brown

Personal details
- Born: 1826; Butler County, Pennsylvania, U.S.
- Died: August 17, 1910 (aged 83–84)
- Resting place: Allegheny Cemetery, Pittsburgh, Pennsylvania, U.S.
- Political party: Republican
- Profession: Politician

Adam M. Brown (1826 – August 17, 1910) was an American politician. He was Mayor of Pittsburgh in 1901.

== Early life ==
Adam Mercer Brown was born in Butler County, Pennsylvania just north of Pittsburgh in 1826. He originally wanted to become a doctor but instead went west to find his fortune during the California Gold Rush, during his stay in the west he had a brief military career and earned the rank of Major. Upon his return to Pittsburgh, he was chosen as the first president of the Allegheny County Bar Association. Adam Brown also became a common pleas judge and founded a bank.

== Pittsburgh politics ==
Brown was appointed mayor in May 1901 and due to a commonwealth reorganization had his office retitled "recorder". He was only to spend six brief months running the city, and stripped of his duties in November 1901.

== Death and interment ==
Brown died in August 1910, and was buried in the Allegheny Cemetery.

== See also ==
- List of mayors of Pittsburgh

Political offices
Preceded by William J. Diehl	Mayor of Pittsburgh; 1901	Succeeded by Joseph O. Brown
