= Abrasion collar =

Skin injury accompanying gunshot wounds

Abrasion collar

An abrasion collar, also known as an abrasion ring or abrasion rim, is a narrow ring of stretched, abraded skin immediately surrounding projectile wounds, such as gunshot wounds. It is most commonly associated with entrance wounds and is a mechanical defect due to a projectile's penetration through the skin. It is caused by a temporary over-stretching of the skin surrounding the projectile's point of penetration. Like all skin abrasions, the abrasion collar tends to dry out due to scraping away of the skin's outer layers and the collapse and dehydration of the underlying cells; it therefore becomes easier to discern with time. This defect is most often seen around rifled firearm entrance wounds due to the striations or grooves in the bullet's surface caused by the rifling on the inside of the weapon's barrel; however, certain other high-velocity projectile wounds can also have the same effect.

An abrasion collar is usually found in association with a contusion collar of bruising caused by damaged blood vessels in the skin by hydrostatic forces from the bullet's entry. An abrasion rim defect is also possible in firearm exit wounds under certain circumstances, such as if the skin at the exit was crushed between the outgoing bullet and an unyielding object pressed against the skin over the exit site, or if the projectile exits at an extreme angle. Careful examination of the wound under magnification may show signs of everted (outward-turned) edges characteristic of an exit wound. Multiple projectiles impacting in close proximity together, such as in a close-range shotgun blast, will usually still produce an abrasion rim or artefact, though the wound will likely be irregular in shape.

== Factors and characteristics ==
=== Bullet wipe ===
In the case of gunshot wounds from unjacketed lead alloy bullets or dirty bullets, a phenomenon known as bullet wipe may be observed, which forms a ring of greasy residue known as a grease or dirt collar that overlays the abrasion collar and is caused by deposits on the skin's surface. Generally, these deposits contain lead from the unjacketed projectile or oil from inside the weapon's barrel, but they may simply be dirty. Studies using high-speed photography have shown that bullet wipe is caused only by the head of the bullet—instead of the body—because the skin recoils away from the bullet as it penetrates due to the force of entry.

=== Angle of trajectory ===
The bullet's angle of trajectory at the point where it penetrates the skin can influence the shape of the abrasion collar. This can be used by forensic pathologists in discerning an approximate angle of entry and is important in investigations of gunshot wound victims, where evidence of the gunshot's origin is necessary to determine whether the death was homicidal, suicidal, or accidental. Generally, if the bullet impacts at an angle perpendicular to the skin surface, the abrasion collar will be symmetrical, concentric, round, and evenly-shaped. As the angle between the trajectory and the skin surface decreases, the abrasion collar becomes more distorted and often more distinct at the point of entry, having a semi-lunar or "half-moon" shape with the broadest width pointing in the direction of the gunshot's origin. This is caused by the exterior of the bullet contacting and scraping over the skin's surface for a certain distance before penetrating the skin.

=== Bullet shape and velocity ===
The bullet shape influences the size of the abrasion collar. High velocity bullets with pointed, narrow, or spitzer tips, such as rifle rounds, and full metal jacket bullets are less likely to produce abrasion collars compared to lower-velocity, semi-jacketed civilian bullets, such as bullets fired from handguns, which have rounded noses.

If the wound is caused by a high-velocity rifle bullet, the abrasion collar may be smaller, but it may have minute tears in the surface of the skin surrounding the wound entrance. This is because the skin is not capable of stretching quickly enough if the bullet's velocity is too high. If the wound is made over bone, such as a head wound in the scalp, the abrasion collar may not be round at all; it instead becomes stellate or "star-shaped" with ragged and torn edges caused by the skin over-stretching and tearing. In the case of skull entrance wounds, the skin that includes the abrasion collar may be torn away because the underlying tissue is unable to flex away from the force of the bullet's entry.

=== Wound distortions ===
Towards the end of a bullet's effective range, it tends to lose axial stability and will begin to yaw or even tumble end-over-end. This means it may impact the skin while travelling sideways, and the resulting wound may be distorted, irregular in shape, or even slit-like, such that it does not resemble a conventional entrance wound. In this case, an abrasion artefact may be absent. Similarly misshapen wounds can be caused by the distortion of the bullet if it hits an intermediate object (including another part of the victim's own body, in what is known as a re-entrant wound) before penetrating the skin surface. However, careful examination of the wound under magnification may show the inverted wound edges and signs of an irregularly-shaped abrasion rim characteristic of entry wounds.
