= Eugene Coon =

Eugene L. Coon, Sr.

Chairperson of the Allegheny County Democratic Party
- In office March 21, 1970 – June 1, 1978
- Preceded by: Thomas Barrett
- Succeeded by: Cyril Wecht

Allegheny County Sheriff
- In office January 2, 1970 – December 27, 1997
- Preceded by: William Davis
- Succeeded by: Pete DeFazio

Personal details
- Born: November 15, 1928 Pittsburgh, Pennsylvania, U.S.
- Died: October 15, 1998 (aged 69)
- Party: Democratic Party
- Education: University of Pittsburgh
- Police career
- Department: Pittsburgh Police; Allegheny County Sheriff
- Service years: 1952–1969 (Pittsburgh Police); 1970–1998 (Allegheny Sheriff)
- Rank: Elected Sheriff; 1970-1997; "Detective in Charge" of Vice; 1959-1969; Sergeant; 1957-1959; Commissioned as a Patrolman; 1952- 1957

Eugene L. Coon (November 15, 1928 – October 15, 1998) was a long-time Sheriff of Allegheny County, Pennsylvania (serving Pittsburgh and its immediate suburbs) and an influential figure in the local Democratic Party. He served in the U.S. Army in 1947–1948 and in 1950 for the Korean War until 1952.

== Early life ==
Coon graduated from Perry High School in Pittsburgh, Pennsylvania, in 1947. He attended University of Pittsburgh, studying prelaw.

== Army service ==
Coon served in the U.S. Army in 1947–1948, then re-enlisted in 1950 for the Korean War, where he was a combat infantryman in the 1st Cavalry Division, serving until 1952.

== Law enforcement career ==
Coon began his career as an officer for the Pittsburgh Police in 1952, and rose through the ranks to assistant superintendent. Coon was elected Sheriff in 1969, succeeding the retiring William Davis. He was once called "America's Toughest Cop" by a men's magazine. While he was head of the Pittsburgh homicide squad, the unit solved 57 homicides in a row. He resigned from the Pittsburgh Police in 1969 to run as a Democrat for Sheriff of Allegheny County, Pennsylvania, a position he would hold through seven subsequent elections, ending his career in 1997. He became chair of the Allegheny County Democratic party in the early 1970s. He also ran unsuccessfully for Allegheny County Commissioner and Pittsburgh Mayor.

Coon gained national recognition on January 3, 1983 when he refused to place homes of unemployed steel workers up for public sale following foreclosure proceedings.

He was named to the Pennsylvania Police Hall of Fame on January 27, 1990 and served as a bagpiper in many a St. Patrick's Day parade. He died in his South Side home on Oct. 21, 1998, at age 68.

== FBI files ==
It was revealed in 2011 by WTAE-TV in Pittsburgh that the FBI had kept extensive files on Sheriff Coon beginning in the early to mid-1970s and suspected him of "protecting" and "enforcing" for the Pittsburgh Mob, most notably Tony Grosso's organization.

No charges or public investigation were ever pursued, however the files connect Coon with the same organization that Federal investigators suspected in the death of District Attorney for Pittsburgh Robert Duggan in early 1974. Then-United States District Attorney, and later Governor of Pennsylvania, Richard Thornburgh chose to close the cases and the investigation by 1975.

== Accident ==
In 1988 Sheriff Coon was involved as a pedestrian in an accident with a car, losing one of his legs because of injuries he had suffered.

== Rifle shots at party ==
While in his last term as Sheriff on November 6, 1994, Coon was disturbed at his suburban Donegal second home by a party target shooting next door while he was taking a nap. Pennsylvania State Police responded after Coon had attempted to have his neighbor quiet the party and exhausted in failing that, fired rifle shots to quiet the party crowd.

== See also ==
- Allegheny County District Attorney
- Pittsburgh Police
- Allegheny County Sheriff

Law Enforcement Positions
Preceded by Bill Davis	Allegheny County Sheriff; 1970-1997	Succeeded by Pete DeFazio
