= William Rahauser =

American lawyer

Personal details
- Born: September 22, 1902 Chambersburg, Pennsylvania
- Died: October 9, 1990 (aged 88) Moon Township, Pennsylvania
- Education: Mercersburg Academy; Washington and Jefferson College; University of Pittsburgh; Duquesne University Law School

William Stover Rahauser (September 22, 1902 – October 9, 1990) was the Allegheny County District Attorney from January 1948 to January 1952 and was a member of the Democratic Party. A native of suburban Coraopolis, Pennsylvania, he started in politics winning election to the Pennsylvania State Senate for several terms in the 1940s. He went on to become a District Judge in Pittsburgh.

Legal offices
Preceded by Artemas Leslie	Allegheny County District Attorney; 1948–1952	Succeeded by James F. Malone

== See also ==
- District Attorney
- Pittsburgh Police
- Allegheny County Sheriff
- Allegheny County Police Department
