= James F. Malone =

American politician

James F. Malone, Jr. (1904 – August 29, 1976) was an American politician and lawyer who served as the District Attorney for Allegheny County, Pennsylvania from January 1952 until January 3, 1956. He was a member of the Republican Party and was a member of Pittsburgh City Council in the 1920s and its president in 1928. Malone was the longtime president of the Pennsylvania Manufacturers Association after he retired from his District Attorney Duties. He won election on November 6, 1951 defeating Democratic Judge Francis J. O'Connor.

== See also ==
- District Attorney
- Pittsburgh Police
- Allegheny County Sheriff
- Allegheny County Police Department

Party political offices
Preceded by Frank L. Pinola	Republican nominee for Treasurer of Pennsylvania; 1940	Succeeded by Edgar W. Baird, Jr.
Legal offices
Preceded by William Rahauser	Allegheny County District Attorney; 1952–1956	Succeeded by Edward C. Boyle
