= Samuel H. Gardner =

American lawyer

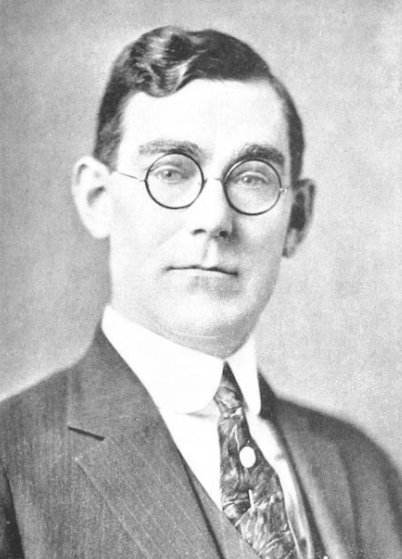
- Born: Samuel Hill Gardner; August 15, 1876; Washington Township, Pennsylvania, US
- Died: February 17, 1942 (aged 65); Tarentum, Pennsylvania, US
- Education: Grove City College; University of Michigan Law School; University of Pittsburgh School of Law
- Occupation(s): Lawyer, judge
- Spouse: Bertha M. Wood (m. 1906)
- Children: 1

Samuel Hill Gardner (1876–1942) was an American lawyer and judge. He served as the Allegheny County District Attorney for Pittsburgh from 1923 to 1930.

== Early life and career ==
Samuel H. Gardner was born in Washington Township, Westmoreland County, Pennsylvania on August 15, 1876. He earned a bachelor's degree at Grove City College in 1901, attended the University of Michigan Law School, and graduated from the University of Pittsburgh School of Law in 1911. He was admitted to the Allegheny County bar that October.

He was appointed assistant district attorney for Pittsburgh in January 1918, and was elected district attorney in November 1923. He resigned on April 23, 1930 when he was appointed a judge of the Court of Common Pleas. He was succeeded as district attorney by Andrew T. Park.

== Personal life ==
Gardner married Bertha M. Wood on April 6, 1906, and they had one daughter.

He died at his home in Tarentum, Pennsylvania on February 17, 1942.

== See also ==
- District Attorney
- Pittsburgh Police
- Allegheny County Sheriff
- Allegheny County Police Department

Legal offices
Preceded by Harry H. Rowand	Allegheny County District Attorney; 1930	Succeeded by Andrew T. Park
