= Edward C. Boyle =

American lawyer

Edward Carol Boyle (December 24, 1904 – June 29, 1981) was the Allegheny County District Attorney in Pittsburgh, Pennsylvania from January 3, 1956, until January 6, 1964.

== Biography ==
Mr. Boyle graduated from Peabody High School and in 1928 from Duquesne University School of Law. He was a member of the Democratic Party, serving as a delegate at the 1960 Democratic National Convention. From 1949 until 1953 he served as U.S. Attorney for the Western District of Pennsylvania.

Boyle died in 1981, at the age of 76, in Cleveland, Ohio.

Legal offices
Preceded by James F. Malone	Allegheny County District Attorney; 1956–1964	Succeeded by Robert Duggan

== See also ==
- District Attorney
- Pittsburgh Police
- Allegheny County Sheriff
- Allegheny County Police Department
