= Artemas Leslie =

American lawyer

Artemas C. Leslie was the Allegheny County District Attorney serving metropolitan Pittsburgh, United States, from December 17, 1945, until January 1948. He was a member of the Republican Party.

Leslie grew up in the Lawrenceville neighborhood of Pennsylvania, and became involved in politics with the help of his father, who was part of the Republican political machine in Allegheny Country. Leslie graduated from Princeton University in 1919, and received his law degree from the University of Pennsylvania in 1924. Leslie's first political post was as the sheriff's solicitor.

Prior to being appointed District Attorney he was chairman of the "Red Cross War Fund" from December 28, 1941, throughout World War II. Leslie often worked with county authorities outside the office, and often assisted county detectives in police raids. Leslie lost his position as District Attorney to Democrat William A. Rahauser, but he was appointed state insurance commissioner by Governor James H. Duff in 1950. He held that post until 1955.

== See also ==
- District Attorney
- Pittsburgh Police
- Allegheny County Sheriff
- Allegheny County Police Department

Legal offices
| Preceded by Russell H. Adams | Allegheny County District Attorney; 1945–1948 | Succeeded by William Rahauser |
