= PAPD =

PAPD may refer to:

- Passive–aggressive personality disorder
- Port Authority of New York and New Jersey Police Department
- Port Authority Police Department (Allegheny County)
