= Frederick Anton =

Frederick Anton may refer to:

- Fred Anton (1934–2017), American lawyer
- Frederick Anton, Prince of Schwarzburg-Rudolstadt (1692–1744)

== See also ==
- Frédéric Anton (born 1964), French chef
