= Port Authority Police Department (disambiguation) =

Port Authority Police Department usually refers to the Port Authority of New York and New Jersey Police Department.

Port Authority Police Department may also refer to:

- Port Authority Police Department (Allegheny County), Pennsylvania
- Delaware River Port Authority Police Department
- Virginia Port Authority Police Department

== See also ==
- Transit police
