= 1984 United States presidential election in Pennsylvania =

- November 6, 1984
- Turnout: 78.20% ▼1.1 pp

| Nominee | Ronald Reagan | Walter Mondale |
| Party | Republican | Democratic |
| Home state | California | Minnesota |
| Running mate | George H. W. Bush | Geraldine Ferraro |
| Electoral vote | 25 | 0 |
| Popular vote | 2,584,323 | 2,228,131 |
| Percentage | 53.34% | 45.99% |

Reagan
50–60%
60–70%
70–80%
80–90%
90–100%
Mondale
50–60%
60–70%
70–80%
80–90%
90–100%
Tie
President before election
Ronald Reagan
Republican
Elected President
Ronald Reagan
Republican

The 1984 United States presidential election in Pennsylvania took place on November 6, 1984, and was part of the 1984 United States presidential election. Voters chose 25 representatives, or electors to the Electoral College, who voted for president and vice president. Pennsylvania voted for the Republican nominee, President Ronald Reagan, over the Democratic nominee, former Vice President Walter Mondale.

Reagan won the state by sweeping the small towns and rural areas of central Pennsylvania and performing well in the traditionally Republican suburbs of Philadelphia, but the race was kept within single digits by Mondale’s strong showing in heavily unionized and traditionally Democratic Western Pennsylvania, as well as his decisive victories in the cities of Pittsburgh and Philadelphia. As of the 2024, this is the last election in which Lackawanna County has voted Republican, the last time that Erie County voted Republican until 2016, and the last time a Republican won one-third of the vote in Philadelphia.

This was one of only three elections since the Civil War in which Pennsylvania has voted more Democratic than neighboring New York (along with 1952 and 1956), and the most recent election in which it voted to the left of Illinois, Washington, or Hawaii. Reagan became the first Republican ever to win the White House without carrying Mercer or Armstrong Counties.

Reagan was the last Republican candidate to win the state twice until Donald Trump did so in 2016 and 2024. He also remains the last Republican candidate to win the state in two consecutive elections.

== Primaries ==
=== Republican primary ===
Ronald Reagan ran uncontested, winning 616,916 votes (turnout: 27.66%).

=== Democratic primary ===
Jesse Jackson's voters were 81% black and 18% white. 41% of Jackson voters listed Mondale as their second candidate in exit polls conducted by CBS News and The New York Times, while 19% listed Hart and 24% selected none.

| Candidate | Votes | Percent |
|---|---|---|
| Walter Mondale | 747,267 | 45.15% |
| Gary Hart | 551,335 | 33.31% |
| Jesse Jackson | 264,463 | 15.98% |
| John Glenn | 22,605 | 1.37% |
| Others | 69,281 | 4.19% |
| Totals | 1,654,951 | Turnout: 52.10% |

== Results ==
Results in the Pittsburgh Metropolitan Statistical Area, shaded by municipality

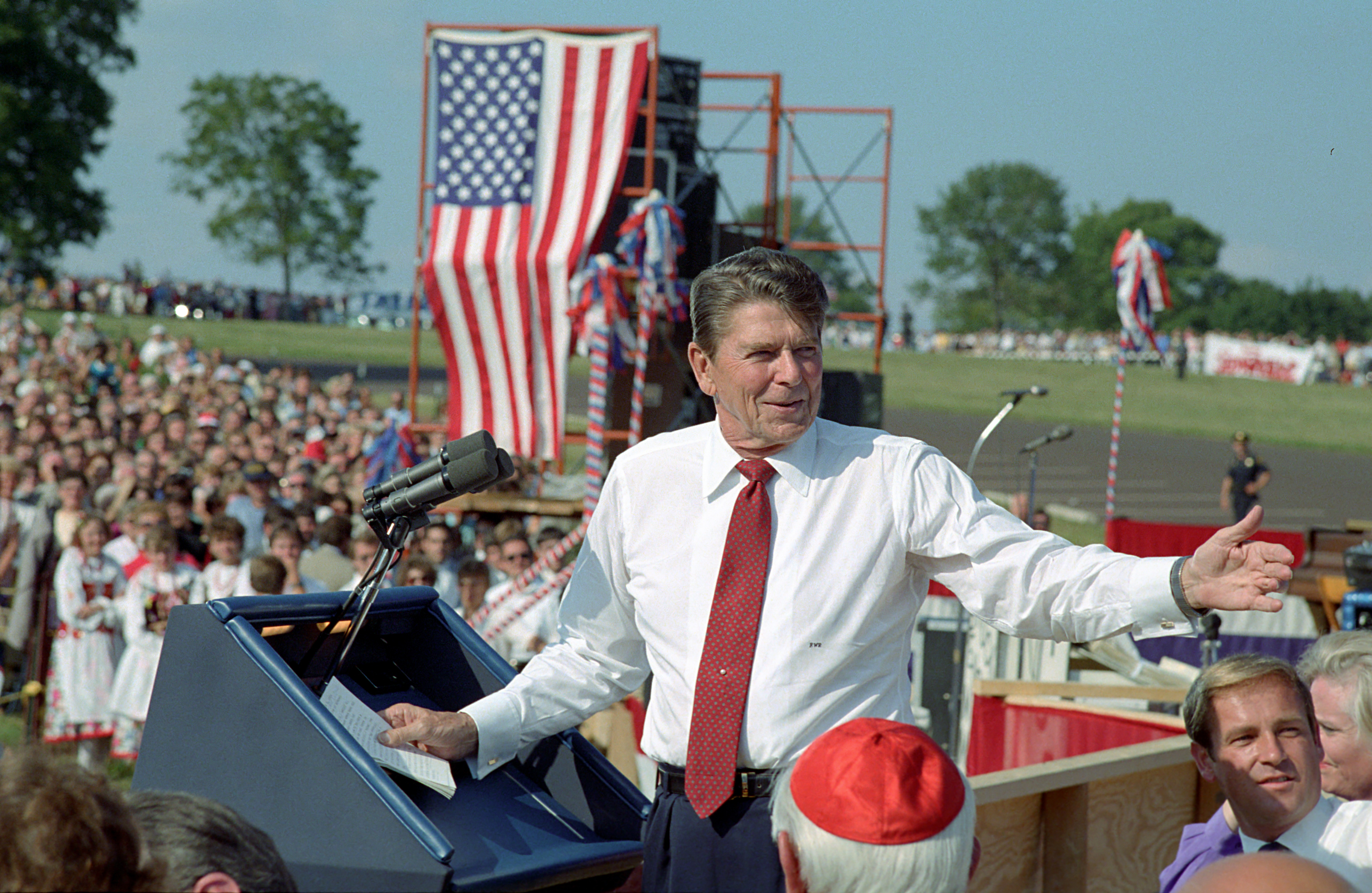
President Ronald Reagan gives remarks at the Polish Festival National Shrine of Our Lady of Czestochowa Doylestown, Pennsylvania on September 9, 1984.

1984 United States presidential election in Pennsylvania
| Party | Candidate | Votes | Percentage | Electoral votes |
|---|---|---|---|---|
| Republican | Ronald Reagan (incumbent) | 2,584,323 | 53.34% | 25 |
| Democratic | Walter Mondale | 2,228,131 | 45.99% | 0 |
| Consumer | Sonia Johnson | 21,628 | 0.45% | 0 |
| Libertarian | David Bergland | 6,982 | 0.14% | 0 |
| Workers' League | Edward Winn | 2,059 | 0.04% | 0 |
| Communist | Gus Hall | 1,780 | 0.04% | 0 |
| Totals | | 4,844,903 | 100.00% | 25 |

=== Results by county ===
| County | Ronald Reagan Republican | | Walter Mondale Democratic | | Various candidates Other parties | | Margin | | Total votes cast |
| County | # | % | # | % | # | % | # | % | Total votes cast |
|---|---|---|---|---|---|---|---|---|---|
| Adams | 16,786 | 69.44% | 7,289 | 30.15% | 99 | 0.41% | 9,497 | 39.29% | 24,174 |
| Allegheny | 284,692 | 42.76% | 372,576 | 55.96% | 8,480 | 1.27% | -87,884 | -13.20% | 665,748 |
| Armstrong | 13,709 | 48.37% | 14,525 | 51.25% | 110 | 0.39% | -816 | -2.88% | 28,344 |
| Beaver | 32,052 | 36.79% | 54,765 | 62.86% | 300 | 0.34% | -22,713 | -26.07% | 87,117 |
| Bedford | 13,085 | 70.57% | 5,424 | 29.25% | 34 | 0.18% | 7,661 | 41.32% | 18,543 |
| Berks | 74,605 | 65.94% | 37,849 | 33.45% | 691 | 0.61% | 36,756 | 32.49% | 113,145 |
| Blair | 30,104 | 65.52% | 15,651 | 34.06% | 190 | 0.41% | 14,453 | 31.46% | 45,945 |
| Bradford | 14,808 | 72.71% | 5,474 | 26.88% | 85 | 0.42% | 9,334 | 45.83% | 20,367 |
| Bucks | 130,119 | 63.25% | 74,568 | 36.25% | 1,032 | 0.50% | 55,551 | 27.00% | 205,719 |
| Butler | 31,676 | 55.94% | 24,735 | 43.68% | 215 | 0.38% | 6,941 | 12.26% | 56,626 |
| Cambria | 32,173 | 44.50% | 39,865 | 55.14% | 258 | 0.36% | -7,692 | -10.64% | 72,296 |
| Cameron | 2,031 | 67.05% | 990 | 32.68% | 8 | 0.26% | 1,041 | 34.37% | 3,029 |
| Carbon | 10,701 | 54.41% | 8,836 | 44.93% | 131 | 0.67% | 1,865 | 9.48% | 19,668 |
| Centre | 27,802 | 62.85% | 16,194 | 36.61% | 240 | 0.54% | 11,608 | 26.24% | 44,236 |
| Chester | 92,221 | 70.11% | 38,870 | 29.55% | 440 | 0.33% | 53,351 | 40.56% | 131,531 |
| Clarion | 9,836 | 64.27% | 5,407 | 35.33% | 61 | 0.40% | 4,429 | 28.94% | 15,304 |
| Clearfield | 18,653 | 60.62% | 11,963 | 38.88% | 153 | 0.50% | 6,690 | 21.74% | 30,769 |
| Clinton | 6,678 | 59.24% | 4,525 | 40.14% | 70 | 0.62% | 2,153 | 19.10% | 11,273 |
| Columbia | 14,402 | 63.39% | 8,254 | 36.33% | 62 | 0.27% | 6,148 | 27.06% | 22,718 |
| Crawford | 20,181 | 60.80% | 12,792 | 38.54% | 222 | 0.67% | 7,389 | 22.26% | 33,195 |
| Cumberland | 49,282 | 69.29% | 21,374 | 30.05% | 467 | 0.66% | 27,908 | 39.24% | 71,123 |
| Dauphin | 54,330 | 61.28% | 33,576 | 37.87% | 752 | 0.85% | 20,754 | 23.41% | 88,658 |
| Delaware | 161,754 | 61.79% | 98,207 | 37.51% | 1,821 | 0.70% | 63,547 | 24.28% | 261,782 |
| Elk | 8,470 | 60.47% | 5,486 | 39.17% | 51 | 0.36% | 2,984 | 21.30% | 14,007 |
| Erie | 55,860 | 51.12% | 52,471 | 48.02% | 935 | 0.86% | 3,389 | 3.10% | 109,266 |
| Fayette | 21,314 | 37.69% | 35,098 | 62.07% | 135 | 0.24% | -13,784 | -24.38% | 56,547 |
| Forest | 1,468 | 63.36% | 839 | 36.21% | 10 | 0.43% | 629 | 27.15% | 2,317 |
| Franklin | 27,243 | 70.13% | 11,480 | 29.55% | 122 | 0.31% | 15,763 | 40.58% | 38,845 |
| Fulton | 3,254 | 71.14% | 1,309 | 28.62% | 11 | 0.24% | 1,945 | 42.52% | 4,574 |
| Greene | 6,376 | 40.40% | 9,365 | 59.33% | 43 | 0.27% | -2,989 | -18.93% | 15,784 |
| Huntingdon | 10,220 | 69.57% | 4,430 | 30.15% | 41 | 0.28% | 5,790 | 39.42% | 14,691 |
| Indiana | 18,845 | 54.22% | 15,791 | 45.43% | 123 | 0.35% | 3,054 | 8.79% | 34,759 |
| Jefferson | 11,334 | 65.31% | 5,950 | 34.28% | 71 | 0.41% | 5,384 | 31.03% | 17,355 |
| Juniata | 5,059 | 65.66% | 2,624 | 34.06% | 22 | 0.29% | 2,435 | 31.60% | 7,705 |
| Lackawanna | 48,132 | 50.57% | 45,851 | 48.17% | 1,202 | 1.26% | 2,281 | 2.40% | 95,185 |
| Lancaster | 99,090 | 75.63% | 31,308 | 23.90% | 618 | 0.47% | 67,782 | 51.73% | 131,016 |
| Lawrence | 19,277 | 44.43% | 23,981 | 55.27% | 128 | 0.30% | -4,704 | -10.84% | 43,386 |
| Lebanon | 27,008 | 71.61% | 10,520 | 27.89% | 188 | 0.50% | 16,488 | 43.72% | 37,716 |
| Lehigh | 61,799 | 59.69% | 41,089 | 39.69% | 649 | 0.63% | 20,710 | 20.00% | 103,537 |
| Luzerne | 69,169 | 53.50% | 58,482 | 45.23% | 1,640 | 1.27% | 10,687 | 8.27% | 129,291 |
| Lycoming | 28,498 | 68.02% | 13,147 | 31.38% | 250 | 0.60% | 15,351 | 36.64% | 41,895 |
| McKean | 10,963 | 69.22% | 4,818 | 30.42% | 58 | 0.37% | 6,145 | 38.80% | 15,839 |
| Mercer | 24,211 | 49.11% | 24,658 | 50.01% | 434 | 0.88% | -447 | -0.90% | 49,303 |
| Mifflin | 9,106 | 63.35% | 5,178 | 36.03% | 89 | 0.62% | 3,928 | 27.32% | 14,373 |
| Monroe | 16,109 | 65.82% | 8,193 | 33.48% | 172 | 0.70% | 7,916 | 32.34% | 24,474 |
| Montgomery | 181,426 | 64.18% | 99,741 | 35.29% | 1,499 | 0.53% | 81,685 | 28.89% | 282,666 |
| Montour | 4,174 | 66.81% | 2,055 | 32.89% | 19 | 0.30% | 2,119 | 33.92% | 6,248 |
| Northampton | 44,648 | 53.49% | 37,979 | 45.50% | 840 | 1.01% | 6,669 | 7.99% | 83,467 |
| Northumberland | 22,109 | 61.13% | 13,748 | 38.01% | 308 | 0.85% | 8,361 | 23.12% | 36,165 |
| Perry | 9,365 | 71.42% | 3,692 | 28.16% | 56 | 0.43% | 5,673 | 43.26% | 13,113 |
| Philadelphia | 267,178 | 34.60% | 501,369 | 64.94% | 3,555 | 0.46% | -234,191 | -30.34% | 772,102 |
| Pike | 6,343 | 71.17% | 2,503 | 28.08% | 67 | 0.75% | 3,840 | 43.09% | 8,913 |
| Potter | 5,164 | 73.94% | 1,789 | 25.62% | 31 | 0.44% | 3,375 | 48.32% | 6,984 |
| Schuylkill | 37,330 | 58.96% | 25,758 | 40.68% | 224 | 0.35% | 11,572 | 18.28% | 63,312 |
| Snyder | 8,968 | 78.73% | 2,383 | 20.92% | 40 | 0.35% | 6,585 | 57.81% | 11,391 |
| Somerset | 19,502 | 58.23% | 13,900 | 41.50% | 89 | 0.27% | 5,602 | 16.73% | 33,491 |
| Sullivan | 1,926 | 66.67% | 952 | 32.95% | 11 | 0.38% | 974 | 33.72% | 2,889 |
| Susquehanna | 10,566 | 69.95% | 4,471 | 29.60% | 67 | 0.44% | 6,095 | 40.35% | 15,104 |
| Tioga | 10,532 | 71.92% | 4,060 | 27.72% | 52 | 0.36% | 6,472 | 44.20% | 14,644 |
| Union | 7,792 | 73.66% | 2,747 | 25.97% | 40 | 0.38% | 5,045 | 47.69% | 10,579 |
| Venango | 13,507 | 59.44% | 9,114 | 40.11% | 104 | 0.46% | 4,393 | 19.33% | 22,725 |
| Warren | 10,838 | 62.93% | 6,244 | 36.26% | 139 | 0.81% | 4,594 | 26.67% | 17,221 |
| Washington | 34,782 | 40.47% | 50,911 | 59.24% | 244 | 0.28% | -16,129 | -18.77% | 85,937 |
| Wayne | 10,061 | 75.66% | 3,155 | 23.73% | 81 | 0.61% | 6,906 | 51.93% | 13,297 |
| Westmoreland | 71,377 | 46.82% | 79,906 | 52.41% | 1,181 | 0.77% | -8,529 | -5.59% | 152,464 |
| Wyoming | 7,230 | 74.01% | 2,518 | 25.78% | 21 | 0.21% | 4,712 | 48.23% | 9,769 |
| York | 75,020 | 68.67% | 33,359 | 30.54% | 868 | 0.79% | 41,661 | 38.13% | 109,247 |
| Totals | 2,584,323 | 53.34% | 2,228,131 | 45.99% | 32,449 | 0.67% | 356,192 | 7.35% | 4,844,903 |

=== Results by congressional district ===
Reagan carried 17 of the 23 congressional districts, including seven held by Democrats.

| District | Reagan | Mondale |
|---|---|---|
| 1st | 34.8% | 65.2% |
| 2nd | 10.4% | 89.6% |
| 3rd | 64% | 46% |
| 4th | 48% | 52% |
| 5th | 66.9% | 33.1% |
| 6th | 64% | 36% |
| 7th | 62.3% | 37.7% |
| 8th | 64.2% | 35.8% |
| 9th | 66.7% | 33.3% |
| 10th | 61.9% | 38.1% |
| 11th | 56% | 44% |
| 12th | 50.8% | 49.2% |
| 13th | 60% | 40% |
| 14th | 30.6% | 69.4% |
| 15th | 57.6% | 42.4% |
| 16th | 74.2% | 25.8% |
| 17th | 66.9% | 33.1% |
| 18th | 58.2% | 41.8% |
| 19th | 67.9% | 32.1% |
| 20th | 37.9% | 62.1% |
| 21st | 53.2% | 46.8% |
| 22nd | 42.9% | 57.1% |
| 19th | 62.9% | 37.1% |

== Electors ==
Marian Bell, James F. Malone III, Ginny Thornburgh, Coral Scranton, Fred Anton, Harvey Bartle III, Thomas Milhollan, Marta Bell Schoeninger, John H. Ware III, and Theodore Metzger Jr. were among the Republican electors. The Democratic elector slate included Judith Heh, Roxanne Jones, Cathy Irvis, James J. Manderino, and Nancy Nancarrow. Malone was the chair of the electors and Bell was an elector for Richard Nixon in 1972 and Reagan in 1980.

== See also ==
- United States presidential elections in Pennsylvania

== Works cited ==
- Ranney, Austin, ed. (1985). The American Elections of 1984. Duke University Press. ISBN 0822302306.
