= Allegheny County Housing Authority Police =

Allegheny County Housing Authority Police Department
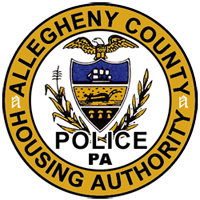
- Common name: Allegheny County Housing Police
- Motto: To Protect and Serve

Jurisdictional structure
- Operations jurisdiction: Allegheny County, Pennsylvania, United States
- Governing body: Allegheny County Housing Authority

Operational structure
- Headquarters: 301 Chartiers Ave Mckees Rocks, PA 15136
- Officers: 11
- Civilians: 1
- Agency executive: Michael J. Vogel, Chief of Police

Website
- Department Page

The Allegheny County Housing Authority Police is a law enforcement agency in Allegheny County, Pennsylvania. It is a housing police agency which provides patrol, investigation and crime prevention services to the Allegheny County Housing Authority. Approximately 3,300 units and three HOPE VI developments are served by the department.

== Organization ==
The executive of the Housing Authority Police Department is the Chief of Police, currently Michael J. Vogel, and is appointed by the Allegheny County Housing Authority. The department consists of three sections.

- Patrol Division - The Patrol Division provides routine patrol and emergency response services to all ACHA properties. It also maintains sub-stations at several locations.
- Crime Prevention Unit - The Crime Prevention Unit provides crime prevention, community-engagement and youth relations services to ACHA residents. This includes D.A.R.E., safety and security education and domestic violence reduction programs.
- Investigations Unit - The Investigations Unit provides investigation of suspected fraud by ACHA public housing and Section 8 tenants, employees and contractors. It regularly conducts investigations in conjunction with the ACHA Inspector-General.

== Contract services ==
The department, through the Investigations Unit, provides housing fraud investigation services to the Pittsburgh City Housing Authority, Westmoreland County Housing Authority and Huntingdon County Housing Authority.

== See also ==
- Allegheny County Police Department
- Allegheny County Sheriff's Office
- Allegheny County Port Authority Police Department
- Law enforcement in Pennsylvania
