= Allegheny County District Attorney =

Elected district attorney

- Incumbent; Stephen Zappala since 1998
- Allegheny County District Attorney's Office
- Seat: Pittsburgh
- Term length: 4 years
- Formation: 1892
- First holder: Clarence Burleigh
- Unofficial names: DA
- Website: alleghenycountyda.us

The Allegheny County district attorney is the elected district attorney for Pittsburgh and Allegheny County, Pennsylvania. The office is responsible for the prosecution of violations of Pennsylvania commonwealth laws (federal law violations are prosecuted by the U.S. Attorney for the Western District of Pennsylvania). The current district attorney is Stephen Zappala.

In 1995, the assistant district attorneys formed a collective bargaining unit and voted to be represented by the United Steelworkers of America. The bargaining unit also represents assistant public defenders and scientists in the coroner's office (now the Office of Medical Examiner) and computer professionals in the prothonotary's office (now the Department of Court Records).

== History ==
DA	Start of term	End of term	Refs	Political party
Clarence Burleigh	1892	January 1, 1895		
John Carothers Haymaker	January 1, 1895	January 1, 1904		
James Musial	January 1, 1904	January 1, 1907		
Harry L. Goehring	January 1907	1908		
William Augustus Blakeley	1908	1914		
William Augustus Blakeley	1908	1914		
Harry H. Rowand	February 7, 1922	December 15, 1922		
R.H. Jackson	April 11, 1914	Before May 1922		
Samuel H. Gardner	December 15, 1922	1930		
Andrew T. Park	1930	1942		
Russell H. Adams	1942	1945		(Republican)
Artemas Leslie	1945	1948		(Republican)
William Rahauser	1948	1952		(Democrat)
James F. Malone	1952	1956		(Republican)
Edward C. Boyle	1956	1964		(Democrat)
Robert Duggan	1964	1974		(Republican)
John Hickton	1974	1976		(Democrat)
Robert E. Colville	1976	1998		(Democrat)
Stephen Zappala	1998	present		(Republican, switched from Democrat in 2023)

== See also ==
- Allegheny County Police Department
- Allegheny County Sheriff's Office
- List of law enforcement agencies in Pennsylvania
- Pittsburgh Police
