= The 24 Karat Club of the City of New York =

The 24-Karat Club of the City of New York (often referred to as the 24-Karat Club of New York or simply 24K Club) is a selective association of senior executives from the fine jewelry and watch industry and related trades, based in New York City. Founded in 1902, the Club is one of the oldest and most influential organizations in the American jewelry trade. The club’s stated mission is to “foster the interests of the jewelry industry by forming a fellowship uniting men and women within the industry and kindred trades,” with membership granted through a formal nomination and election process recognizing established industry leaders. Its annual black-tie banquet—held for more than a century—is among the most prestigious gatherings in the jewelry world.

== History ==
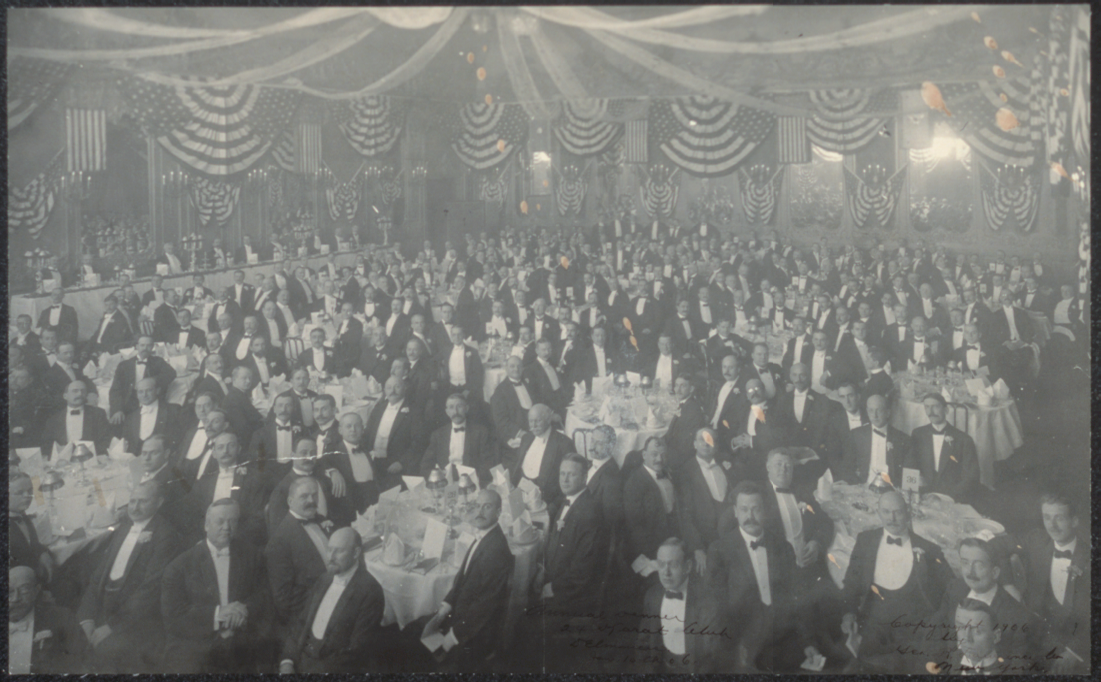
24 Karat annual banquet at Delmonico's, January 16, 1906

The 24-Karat Club of the City of New York was founded in 1902 by a group of jewelry manufacturers, wholesalers, and allied-trade executives at the height of New York’s emergence as a center of the American jewelry business. Early activities included informal luncheons and social gatherings that quickly evolved into more elaborate dinners and outings, reflecting the close-knit nature of the trade and the desire to foster fellowship and professional relationships among senior figures within the industry.

One of the most colorful early traditions was the Beefsteak Dinner, introduced in 1908. Held at venues such as Reisenweber’s Beefsteak Garret, these events were deliberately raucous and “exclusively male,” with members in butcher’s aprons and chef hats eating steak with their hands while seated on boxes and barrels in a deliberately rough-hewn setting.

By the 1910s, the club’s annual banquet had become a major society event. In 1912, U.S. President William Howard Taft was the guest of honor at the banquet, held at New York’s Hotel Astor, underscoring the club’s prominence within both the jewelry trade and the broader American society.

In 1913, the banquet moved to the Waldorf Astoria’s grand ballroom, then at Fifth Avenue and 34th Street, and later followed the hotel to its current Park Avenue location. Over the 20th century, the event ended up drawing senior figures from brands, retailers, suppliers, and trade associations.

The 24-Karat Club Annual Banquet is the organization’s signature event and one of the longest-running black-tie galas in New York. Attendance is extended by members of the Club to invited guests.

From 1913 through 2017 the banquet was closely associated with the Waldorf Astoria, where it became the second-oldest cntinuously hosted event at the hotel, after the Pennsylvania Society dinner. When the Waldorf closed for a multi-year renovation in 2006, the banquet temporarily relocated to the New York Hilton Midtown and the Sheraton New York Times Square, before moving in 2022 to Cipriani South Street, a waterfront venue in Lower Manhattan.

In 2020 the club announced that the 2021 banquet would be canceled due to the COVID-19 pandemic, only the third cancellation in the event’s history (previous cancellations occurred during World War I in 1918 and World War II in 1943). The banquet resumed in 2022 at Cipriani South Street, marking the club’s 120th anniversary.

In 2025 the club announced that the banquet would return to the newly renovated Waldorf Astoria New York in March 2026, framing the move as a “homecoming” to its historic venue.

Over the years, the evening has featured high-profile entertainment and guest appearances, from early 20th-century political figures to contemporary musical acts and celebrities.

== Membership and governance ==
Membership in the 24 Karat Club of the City of New York is granted through a formal nomination and election process. Prospective members must be sponsored by a current member and supported by additional members before being submitted for election by vote of the full membership. Trade coverage consistently describes it as a prestigious organization whose members carry senior leadership roles, professional accomplishments, and have made meaningful contributions to the jewelry and watch industry and its allied trades.

While the exact size of the club is not publicly disclosed, its roster typically includes C-suite executives, owners, and senior officers of major brands, manufacturers, wholesalers, and service organizations, as well as leaders of industry trade bodies and associations.

The club is governed by a chairperson, president, vice president, treasurer, secretary, and a board of directors, elected from among the membership.

== Transition from men-only to inclusive membership ==
For much of its history, the 24 Karat Club of the City of New York functioned as a men-only society, reflecting wider norms in early 20th-century business clubs. The club’s own account of its early Beefsteak Dinners in 1908 explicitly notes that these events were “exclusively male,” and contemporary descriptions of the club throughout most of the 1900s refer only to “men” in its fellowship.

In the late 20th century, this began to change. Babette Goodman Cohen, a principal of the men’s jewelry manufacturer IBGoodman, is widely cited as the first woman admitted to the 24 Karat Club of New York, breaking what had been “exclusively a man’s domain for more than 100 years.”

Shortly thereafter, additional women joined. Trade coverage notes that Phyllis M. Bergman, CEO of Mercury Ring, was the second woman granted membership, and in 2003 she became the first woman president of the club. In 2009 she was elected chairperson, the first woman to hold that role in the organization’s then 107-year history, and later served multiple terms as chair.

Today, the club’s mission statement explicitly references “men and women” and its leadership and membership include a significant number of women in senior roles across brands, trade organizations, and service firms.

== Role in the jewelry and watch industry ==
The 24 Karat Club of the City of New York functions as a high-level forum for networking, relationship-building, and the exchange of perspectives across the diamond, colored gemstone, jewelry manufacturing, watchmaking, retail, and allied-trade sectors.

The annual banquet is often described in trade media as the one night each year when leaders from across the industry gather in a single room, with the event serving as an unofficial kickoff to the industry’s calendar and a venue where professional relationships and leadership transitions are reinforced in a formal social setting.

In addition to the banquet, the club hosts seasonal events such as a summer celebration, and its members are frequently involved—individually rather than as a formal club initiative—in various trade organizations, educational bodies, and industry councils.
