= William H. Davis (sheriff) =

- Police career
- Department: Allegheny County Sheriff
- Service years: 1954-1970 (Allegheny County Sheriff's Office)
- Rank: Allegheny County Sheriff; 1954-1970

William H. Davis

Allegheny County Sheriff
- In office January 4, 1954 – January 2, 1970
- Preceded by: Thomas Whitten
- Succeeded by: Eugene Coon

Member of the Pittsburgh City Council
- In office January 7, 1952 – January 4, 1954
- Succeeded by: Paul Jones

Personal details
- Party: Democratic Party

William H. Davis served as Allegheny County Sheriff from 1954 to 1970.

== See also ==
- Police chief
- List of law enforcement agencies in Pennsylvania

Law Enforcement Positions
Preceded by Thomas Whitten	Allegheny County Sheriff; 1954-1970	Succeeded by Eugene Coon
