= Paul F. Jones =

American politician

Member of the Pittsburgh City Council
- In office January 4, 1954 – July 7, 1960
- Preceded by: William Davis
- Succeeded by: James Jordon

Member of the Pennsylvania House of Representatives from the Allegheny County district
- In office January 1, 1951 – January 4, 1954

Personal details
- Born: 1909 Kentucky
- Died: July 7, 1960 (aged 50–51) Pittsburgh, Pennsylvania
- Party: Democratic
- Education: Duquesne University

Paul F. Jones (1909–1960) was the first African-American elected to Pittsburgh, Pennsylvania's City Council in 1954. He also served in the Pennsylvania House of Representatives. He was born in Kentucky in 1909, and moved to Pittsburgh at the age of 11. He graduated from Duquesne Law School and served in World War II. His first public service was in the State House, where he held one of Allegheny County's allotted at-large seats. He was Chair of the Urban Renewal Committee, which played a significant role in the redevelopment of the lower Hill District. He was also active in the NAACP, Urban League, American Legion and VFW. He died in office in July 1960.
