= Pennsylvania Manufacturers' Association =

Industry advocacy group

Pennsylvania Manufacturers Association
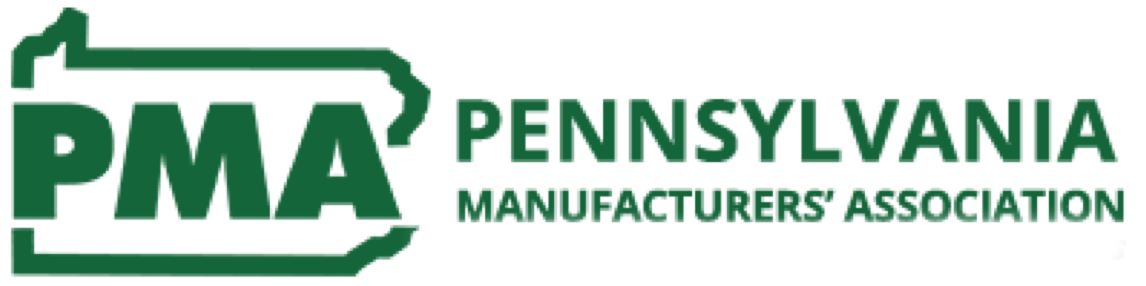
- Abbreviation: PMA
- Formation: October 9, 1909; 117 years ago
- Type: State trade association; advocacy group
- Purpose: Lobbying
- Headquarters: Harrisburg, Pennsylvania
- Chairman: Lowman Henry
- President & CEO: David N. Taylor
- Executive Director: Carl A. Marrara
- Website: pamanufacturers.org

The Pennsylvania Manufacturers' Association is a trade advocacy organization headquartered in Harrisburg, the capital of the Commonwealth of Pennsylvania. The Association was founded in Harrisburg on 9 October 1909 by Joseph R. Grundy, a manufacturer from Bucks County. The group’s original members were Pennsylvania individuals and companies engaged in the manufacturing of goods as well as trade and local associations representing the manufacturers.

The consortium began offering insurance products, providing workers’ compensation insurance in 1915 and fire and other casualty insurance in 1920. In 2004, PMA sold its insurance properties to PMA Capital Insurance Co. of Blue Bell, Pennsylvania, although PMA Capital retained the company’s name.

PMA remained concentrated on events in Pennsylvania until 1925, when it joined the National Industrial Council, part of the National Association of Manufacturers. Although PMA is primarily a trade advocacy group, it has also provided it members support during the COVID-19 pandemic in 2020, conducted workplace safety research projects on drug use affects in employees, supported trade with Taiwan, opposed federal tariffs, and developed programs re-purposing Pennsylvania’s many shut-down coal facilities.

== Founding and early history ==
=== Early days ===
The Pennsylvania Manufacturers’ Association was founded on October 19, 1909 at the Hotel Senate in Harrisburg, PA. The organization’s founding chairman was Joseph R. Grundy, a successful textile manufacturer from Bucks County.

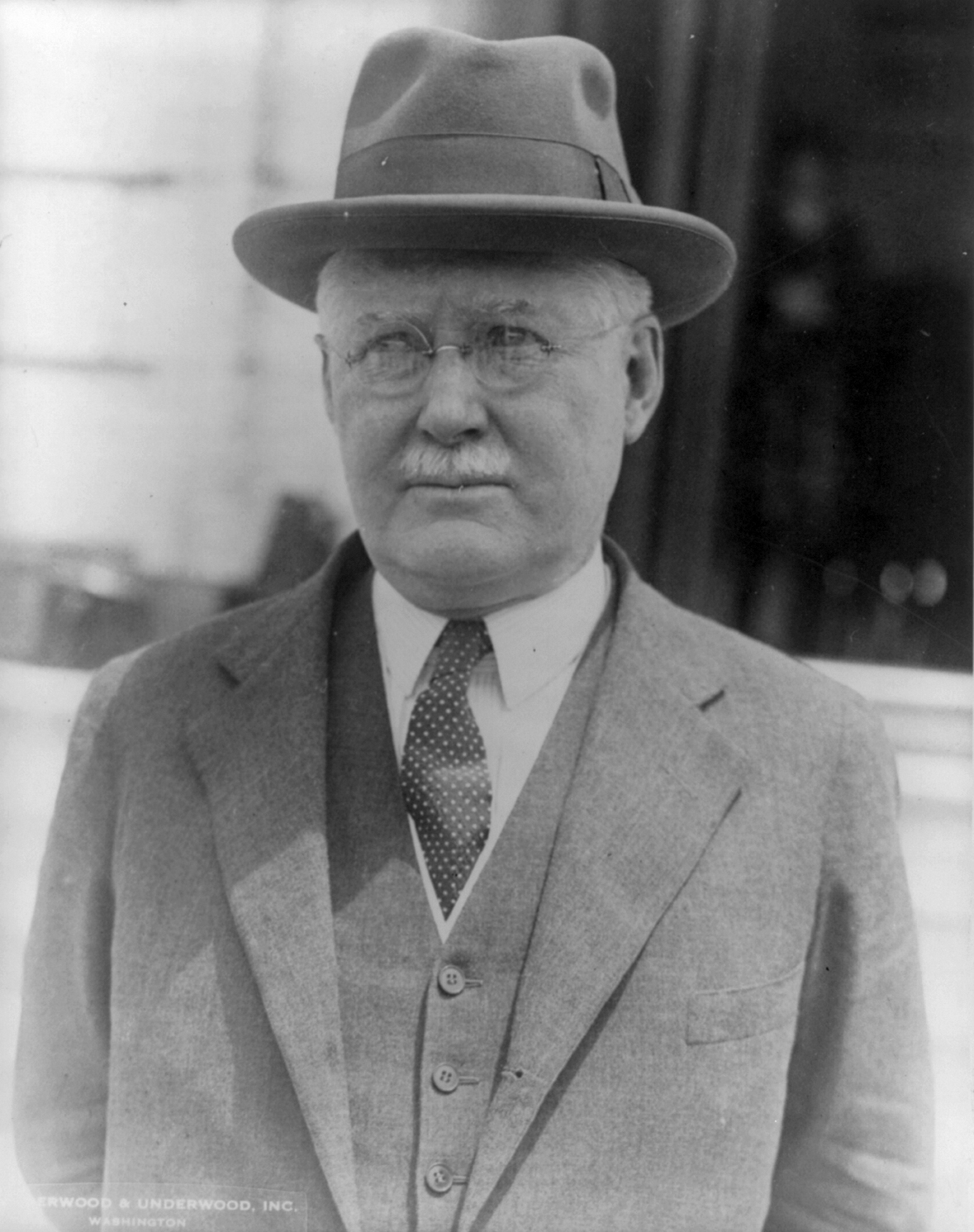
Joseph R. Grundy

A second meeting, held in Philadelphia with more interested parties, directed Grundy to form an executive committee to serve the group until the first official meeting of the Association in January 1910. The members of this executive committee - made up of Grundy and six others, are considered the official founders of the association.

The Articles for Agreement, adapted by the committee, called for the group “...to advance and protect the interests of its members.” There was a provision for two classes of membership: 1. Individuals and businesses engaged directly in manufacturing. 2. Trade and local associations representing manufacturers. The Executive Committee was empowered with management of the organization. The original membership, mostly textile and related organizations, were focused primarily on protecting their economic interests and the political system that had created their economy. The motto of the fledgling association was “Manufacturing is the Keystone of the Keystone State.”

The first few years of the PMA’s existence were challenging. Annual meetings in 1911 and 1912 were postponed due to lack of a quorum. When the Third Meeting was held, in 1912, Grundy reported that the association was specifically founded to "prevent, as far as possible, vicious, unfair, and unwarranted legislation in our State affecting the employment of labour," and that the Association’s members should pay more attention to the Pennsylvania Legislature. Grundy’s personal leadership held things together and, by 1913 the Fourth Annual Meeting was a success. Grundy continued to push for more members and, by 1917, every county in Pennsylvania was represented in the PMA. Also, by 1917, the PMA organized its first publicity committee which developed two important publications, the PMA Monthly Bulletin and the PMA Legislative Bulletin. Under Grundy’s leadership, the PMA was one of the early supporters of Worker’s Compensation and Child Labor Laws in the Commonwealth.

=== Growth and politics ===
By the end of World War I the organization enjoyed a dominant political impact, with the PMA leadership also serving as Republican Party bosses. By the 1980s, membership had grown to 10,000+, 35 trade associations and 10 manufacturing groups. Its president once stated, “There is no Senator or Representative that our members cannot reach and talk with over every weekend….” The organization preferred to ally itself with other Republican factions or groups when attempting to influence elections. Its veto in a primary was usually successful. The membership was overwhelmingly Republican and entirely conservative. Interestingly, John “Jack” Flynn (Pres. 1932-1942) was a Democrat in the Pennsylvania Statehouse for three decades. In the 1960s, the organization’s lobbyist openly admitted he had written bills for the Commonwealth’s House of Representatives.

=== Leadership ===
Grundy resigned his presidential posts in 1929, when he was appointed to serve in the US Senate, a position he held until December 1930. J.W. Rawle succeeded him, but Grundy kept his power by becoming chairman of the Executive Committee when his Senate term concluded. Robert Allen's book on state governments reported Grundy "...professes to be in semi-retirement, but the PMA makes no important decisions without his OK." Grundy held the chairman post until he retired in 1947. Grundy died at age 98 in 1961.

James F. Malone, former Allegheny County (Pittsburgh) district attorney, chairman of the Republican Party in Pittsburgh and Pennsylvania State Insurance Commissioner, became PMA’s president in 1957, serving until 1971. The New York Times described him as “…a power in Pennsylvania Republican politics for more than 30 years.” In 1975 Fred Anton became CEO and president of the organization, giving him significant political influence because, in part, of many of the PMA’s member companies like Hershey Foods, Sun Oil and their thousands of employees. He also guided nominations to the 32-member board of trustees of Penn State University with the honorific “the 33rd trustee.” In spite of his strong ties to the Republican Party, Anton also enjoyed close relationships with Philadelphia Democrats like Michael Nutter, Ed Rendell and Sen. Arlen Specter. Current president and CEO David Taylor was named the second most influential communicator to Pennsylvania’s elected officials by the Pennsylvania Association of Broadcasters. In 2025, City and State - Pennsylvania, named Taylor one of its Trailblazers in Buildings and Infrastructure, the people "...responsible for Pennsylvania's evolving land- and streetscapes."

=== PMA Insurance founding and subsequent sale ===
In 1915, the PMA formed a committee to begin a casualty insurance company that could provide workers’ compensation insurance to the members. By late 1915, a charter was granted and on January 10, 1916, the first annual meeting of the Pennsylvania Manufacturers’ Association Casualty Insurance Company was held, with Grundy as the company’s new president. By 1919, the Pennsylvania Manufacturers’ Association Fire Insurance Company incorporation was approved and that company, again with Grundy as president, held its first annual meeting in January 1920.

In 2004, the Association exited the insurance business and sold the Pennsylvania Manufacturers’ Association Casualty Insurance Company to PMA Capital Insurance Company of Blue Bell, Pennsylvania. The sold entity retained the names Pennsylvania Manufacturers' Association Insurance Co. (PMAIC), Pennsylvania Manufacturers' Indemnity Co. (PMIC) and Manufacturers' Alliance Insurance Corp.(MAIC) In 2010, PMAIC, PMIC and MAIC were acquired by Old Republic International Corporation of Chicago, IL.

=== PMA and NAM ===
The PMA remained determinedly focused on Pennsylvania affairs until the 1920s, when it joined forces with the National Industrial Council, part of the National Association of Manufacturers|National Association of Manufacturers.

Membership grew steadily from 1920 through the 1950s, with the most members leaving the group at the height of the Great Depression in 1933.

=== Positions on tariffs ===
The PMA made its opinions on national matters known as early as the 1920s. In May 1929, PMA voiced its opposition to a new flexible tariff bill, when Grundy indicated that provisions in the bill that gave the Treasury Secretary authority to value imported articles were “woefully lacking.” In June 1930, then Sen. Grundy supported the Smoot-Hawley tariff bill, enduring criticism from Sen. Pat Harrison (D) Mississippi, who said, Grundy “…destroyed much of our work” preparing the bill. Grundy, having lost his Senate seat, returned to the PMA at the end of the year. President Hoover signed the bill on 17 June 1930.

PMA opposed tariffs imposed by the Trump administration mainly because they applied to trading allies such as Canada and Mexico. China, the group pointed out, had saturated the US market with inexpensive, government-subsidized steel products. Canada in particular, is heavily integrated with Pennsylvania manufacturers, the commonwealth exports more to Canada than any other country.

== Activities ==
In the US Presidential election year 2024, Japan’s Nippon Steel made a $14 billion (US) bid for Pennsylvania’s US Steel Corporation. All four major candidates – Former President Trump, Vice President Harris, Sen. Vance and Gov. Walz opposed the deal. Harris said “US Steel should remain American-owned….” The Wall Street Journal labeled this opposition “…the dumbest economic idea of the presidential campaign….” The organization supported Nippon Steel’s offer saying it showed “...mutual strength on the part of our two countries.” and would be good for Pennsylvania as well. CEO Taylor called Trump’s position “wrong-headed.” PMA pointed out that Japan is one of the US’ closest allies and failure of the agreement would hurt Pittsburgh. On June 18, 2025, the acquisition was finalized, with the U.S. government gaining a golden share and extensive control over the company.

In 2024, the association opposed Governor Josh Shapiro’s proposed budget request, noting the budget did not include reforming Pennsylvania’s onerous regulation and tax system. Also that this type of reform would assist in job creation and encourage more investors in the commonwealth’s businesses, improving competitiveness with other states.

In 2024, (then) Governor Josh Shapiro was touted as a possible Vice-Presidential running mate for VP Kamala Harris due to Pennsylvania’s importance as a “swing state” and Shapiro’s record on energy policy, which was similar to Harris’. The PMA opposed Shapiro’s renewable energy mandate stating that, by 2035, it would force Pennsylvania’s utility companies to buy half their electricity from government-designated sources, as opposed to18% in 2024, thereby destroying the competitive Pennsylvania energy market.

The PMA endorsed the commonwealth’s proposed 2022 budget particularly because it contained funding to open the state’s Office of Trade and Investment in Taiwan, previously abandoned. The group foresees future investments in the wake of changes and political unrest in East Asia, citing a $12 billion microchip factory in Arizona as typical of investments that might be expected.

The Pennsylvania Society (independent from the PMA), founded in the late 19th Century by Pennsylvania business leaders who worked in New York City, re-initiated its annual Pennsylvania Society Dinner in Manhattan. The event was cancelled in 2020 because of the pandemic. In 2021, the Pennsylvania Society event returned to Manhattan after the one-year Covid hiatus, closely resembling its original occurrence in 1898 when Pennsylvania emigrants to New York began gathering to “wheel and deal and catch up on happenings in their home state.” The annual dinner celebrated Dr. Ala Stanford of Philadelphia, founder of the Black Doctors COVID-19 Consortium. The other attraction for the Society gala is the PMA independent, annual, invitation-only seminar and luncheon at the Manhattan Metropolitan Club.

In 2020, the organization, collaborating with other organizations and the Commonwealth of Pennsylvania, engaged in promoting public health safety and diminishing the effects of the COVID-19 pandemic by offering an online “Manufacturing Call to Action Portal,” which offered manufacturers access to data that would enable them to quickly get into producing medical supplies to fight the healthcare crisis.

The group opposed bailouts proposed for rescuing the nuclear power industry, specifically in plants owned and operated by FirstEnergy Corp. and Exelon Corp., supporting the commonwealth’s natural gas industry. In 2020, the organization supported a proposal to develop a $400 million natural gas synthesis plant in West Keating PA. The plant would provide 800 construction jobs, 150 permanent jobs and $260 million in total economic outlook. The Pennsylvania Department of Environmental Protection (DEP) opposed the project, stating air quality concerns. Subsequently, it was determined that DEP set its restrictions at too high a level and admitted it did not “know why that happened.” As of September 2022, the project is moving forward.

In 2019 The National Association of Manufacturers joined forces with the PMA in a plan to educate legislators and policy makers in Congress on key issues facing manufacturers. Many Pennsylvania manufacturers joined in the program, called “Manufacturing Means Jobs.”

In 2014, the organization conducted a research project with 200 Pennsylvania manufacturers to determine the effects of drug testing on hiring practices. The survey found that one in three job candidates either fails or refuses to take the drug test. 19% of applicants skip the test; 13% of those who take the test, fail it. This undermines the ability of manufacturers to find willing employees.

Since 2005, 14 coal plants have been closed in Pennsylvania. To address that, the state has developed a “play book” to find new uses for the properties using a federal grant to initiate plans to encourage a speedy process. The PMA's position was that brownfields were assets rather than liabilities to the state. With the program in place, potential buyers and redevelopers would know what was required to renovate and make the closed plants into viable entities. “One of the really positive things we have in place in Pennsylvania are the rules about the redevelopment of brownfields,” the group stated.

In 1992, the organization donated an 8,000+ sq. ft. building on Philadelphia’s Ludlow St. to the Arden Theater Company, adjacent to the Theater Company’s 150-seat theater. The structure, a former powerhouse for the Federal Reserve Bank of Philadelphia, became storage and shops for the company. The PMA hoped the gift would serve as a catalyst for arts organizations in the city’s “Avenue of the Arts.

== Advocacy ==
=== Opposition to right-to-repair legislation ===
In July 2024, the PMA signed a letter to members of both the House Committee on Armed Services and the Senate Committee on Armed Services opposing Section 828 of S. 4628, the National Defense Authorization Act for Fiscal Year 2025, entitled "Requirement for Contractors to Provide Reasonable Access to Repair Materials," which would require contractors doing business with the US military to agree "to provide the Department of Defense fair and reasonable access to all the repair materials, including parts, tools, and information, used by the manufacturer or provider or their authorized partners to diagnose, maintain, or repair the good or service."
