= The Pennsylvania Society =

American society organization

- The logo of The Pennsylvania Society
- Date: Second weekend in December
- Frequency: annual
- Locations: New York City, U.S.
- Inaugurated: 1899; 127 years ago
- Website: www.pasociety.com

In 1899 James Barr Ferree, an historian and native Pennsylvanian living in New York City, invited 55 fellow Pennsylvanians also living in New York to join him for dinner at The Waldorf Astoria Hotel. While enjoying a meal together, they decided to form a group known initially as “The Pennsylvania Society of New York.” Their goal was to establish a society “uniting all Pennsylvanians at home and away from home in bonds of friendship and devotion to their native or adopted state” and would meet for dinner every year, same time, same place.

In 1903, when the organization was incorporated, the name was shortened to “The Pennsylvania Society.” As the years passed, that dinner at The Waldorf Astoria became the hallmark event of The Pennsylvania Society.

A non-profit, charitable organization with members around the world, the Society welcomes all Pennsylvanians. It is in its third century of existence and is the oldest organization of its kind in the country.

Each year, the Gold Medal recipient selects a Pennsylvania charity of their choice, which receives a donation from the Society. Students compete annually for the Society's Benjamin Franklin Scholar Award, a writing competition open to Pennsylvania high school juniors.

== Origins and organization ==
The tradition for Pennsylvania's political and business retreat dates to 1899, when James Barr Ferree, a native Pennsylvanian living in New York invited a group of 55 other Pennsylvanians living in New York to the Waldorf-Astoria Hotel to discuss current affairs in their native state. The dinner became a recurring event and the group began calling themselves "The Pennsylvania Society of New York." It later developed into an annual gathering of Pennsylvania politicians and businessmen on New York City's "neutral ground."

The organization later changed its name to The Pennsylvania Society and became a nonprofit charitable organization. It was incorporated in 1903, and currently claims 2,000 members. While it sponsors a high school essay contest, the main function of the organization is to organize the weekend retreat.

The gathering began as an exclusively Republican event, but it now includes a sizable number of Democrats. The early years of the meeting were reminiscent of the stereotypical smoke-filled room, where Pennsylvania steel, coal and oil magnates met in closed-door meetings to select their political candidates. That public perception continues, with political legend telling of New York-based businessmen summoning Pennsylvania's politicians to New York to receive their instructions for the following year.

== Events and receptions ==
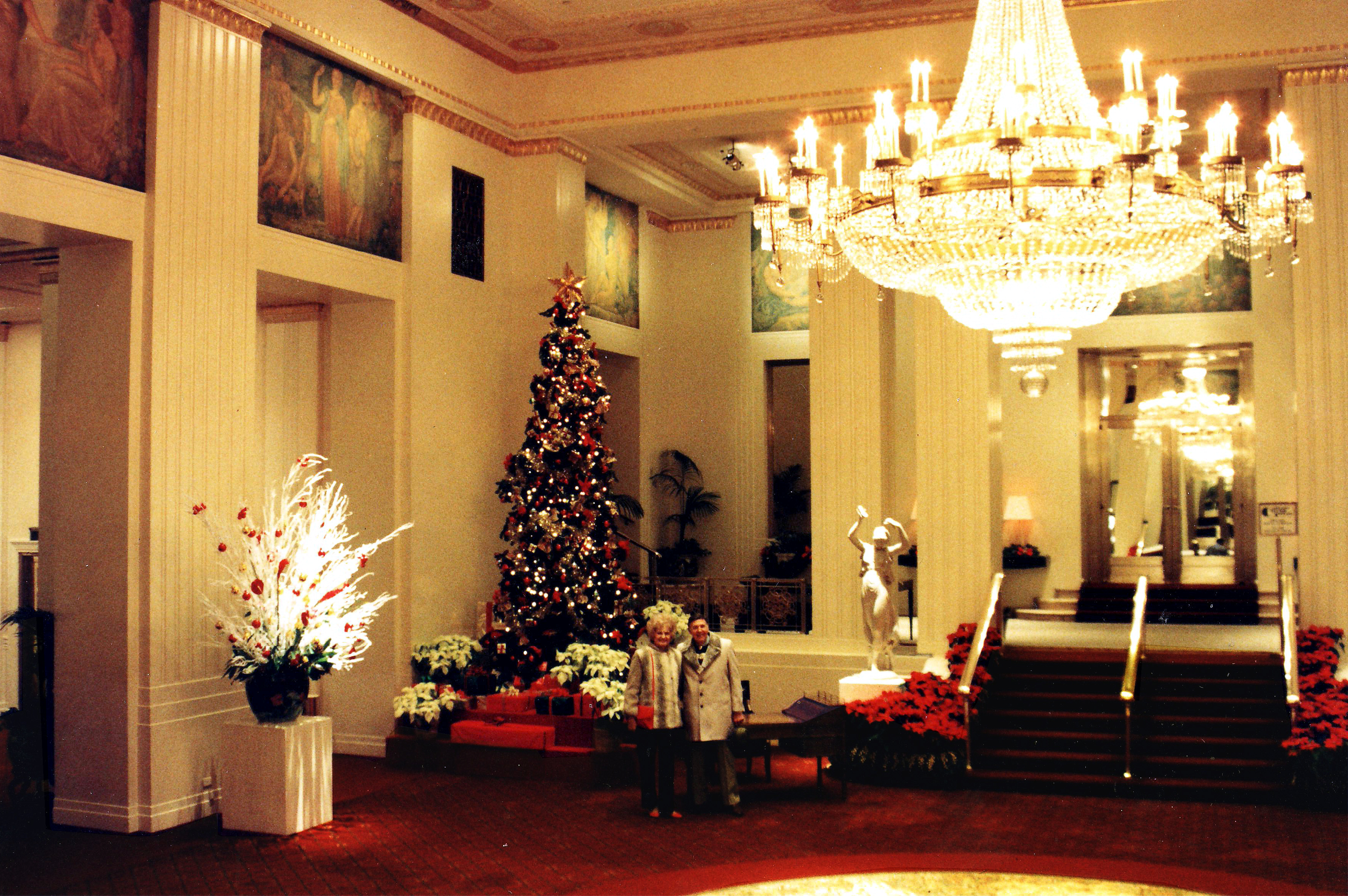
The Waldorf Astoria New York, site of the Pennsylvania Society Dinner

The main attraction of the weekend is the "Pennsylvania Society Dinner," a black tie event held in the Waldorf Astoria New York on the final night of the weekend. In 2005, about 1,500 individuals attended. However, much of the "real action" takes place in the invitation-only dinners and receptions hosted by businesses, candidates, and lobbying firms throughout the weekend. In an attempt to attract more attendees, hosts have hired top tier guests, including Jon Stewart, Lewis Black, and George H. W. Bush, who ended his 2003 speech with a reference to Dana Carvey's impression of him by saying, "Not gonna do it. Wouldn't be prudent." Several events have become well known for drawing high-powered guests, including the events hosted by the Pennsylvania Manufacturers' Association. In 2004, an evening at an Upper East Side cigar lounge hosted by Republican national committeewoman Christine Toretti Olson gained significant praise from attendees. In a 2005 event, Rick Santorum was able to raise $46,000 for his 2006 re-election campaign and $130,000 for the Pennsylvania Republican Party.

The Pennsylvania Society has become known as the "unofficial start of the next year's big political season" because of its reputation as a place for potential political candidates to make contacts, meet fundraisers, and make a name for themselves early in the electoral process.

Former Speaker of the Pennsylvania House of Representatives Bill DeWeese said in 2003 that the Pennsylvania Society is "a magnificent re-creation of the gilded age and the era of the robber barons of the late 19th century, when Fricks and Carnegies and Pews dominated Pennsylvania's commercial and political scene. Slender elements of its original purpose endure. However, it is primarily a hell of a party."

== Criticism and counter-event ==
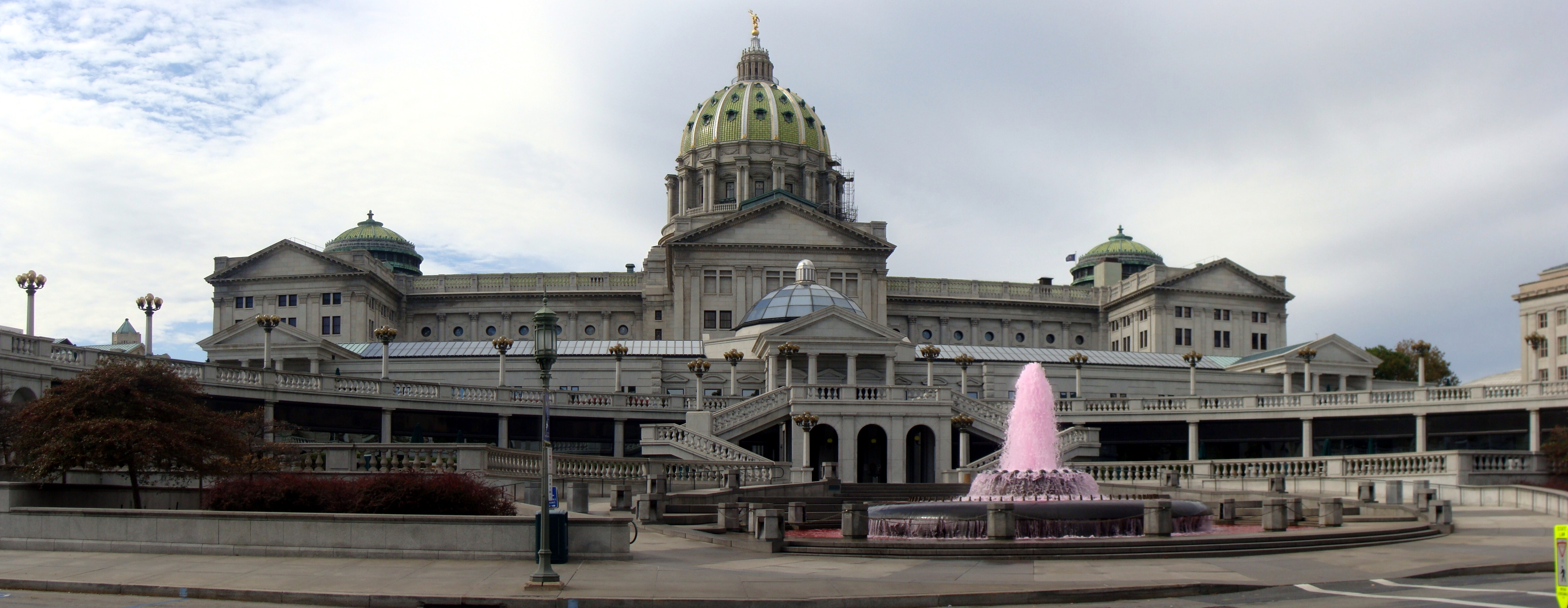
East Wing of the Pennsylvania State Capitol, the site of the "Pennsylvania People's Dinner" protest event

Public watchdogs have criticized the event as a chance for "wealthy special interests to mingle with the movers and shakers in state government" or as a gathering for "fat cat" politicians away from their Pennsylvania constituents.

During the 2005 Pennsylvania Society weekend, Gene Stilp and Eric Epstein, governmental reform and anti-pay raise activists, hosted the "Pennsylvania People's Dinner," a reform-themed potluck dinner in the "darkened, barely heated" East Wing of the Pennsylvania State Capitol while the members of the Pennsylvania General Assembly are in New York City. The event, described as "part parody, part celebration" of the November repeal of the controversial pay raise, featured paper plates and folding chairs for the potluck style dinner. The hosts decorated the capitol with toy pigs, the mascot of the anti-pay-raise movement, and stuffed cows, mocking John Perzel's defense of the pay raise by claiming that "immigrant cow-milkers" make as much as legislators. The dinner has become an annual event, with the lack of lighting and heating becoming part of the tradition. The event has undergone several name changes: in 2006 it was called the "Pennsylvania New Society Dinner," in 2007 it was the "Real Pennsylvania Society Dinner."

== Location ==
Attendees have been known to enjoy the New York City tourist attractions, including the Broadway theatre and the Fifth Avenue shopping district.

Political pundits frequently note the irony of holding the Pennsylvania Society in New York. In 2003, Ed Rendell suggested that the $20–$40 million economic impact from the event would best be directed to a city in Pennsylvania, but said "since I can't get a budget passed, I'm going to leave that for another day." In 2005, Philadelphia City Council unanimously passed a resolution sponsored by Frank DiCicco calling for the event to be moved within Pennsylvania. "Everybody who is anybody, and everybody who wants to be somebody, is there.""The three-day crush of Manhattan cocktail parties known as the Pennsylvania Society is a requisite stop for aspiring candidates and potential donors."

Many attendees downplay the Pennsylvania Society's corrupt image, with Ken Davis, chairman of the Montgomery County Republican Party, telling the Philadelphia Inquirer, "I don't know anybody who's been bought at Pennsylvania Society. Rented, maybe – but not bought."

== See also ==
- List of dining events
