= Robert Duggan (attorney) =

American politician (1926–1974)

Robert Ward Duggan (January 27, 1926 – March 5, 1974) served as Allegheny County District Attorney in Pittsburgh, Pennsylvania for a decade, from January 1964 until his shooting death under mysterious circumstances in March 1974. He had been under investigation by then-United States District Attorney Richard Thornburgh for corruption.

== Early life and family ==
Born and raised in Pittsburgh, Duggan was the son of Blanche and Frank L. Duggan. His father was the president of Consolidated Ice Company and at one time was the president of the Greater Pittsburgh Chamber of Commerce. He had two brothers, Frank Jr. and John.

He was educated at the Shady Side Academy. After graduating from high school in 1944, he enlisted in the Air Force and spent the remainder of World War II in the aviation cadet training program. Following the war, he attended the University of Pennsylvania for an undergraduate degree and earned his law degree from the University of Pittsburgh.

He married his longtime partner, socialite Cordelia Scaife May, an heiress to the Mellon fortune, on August 23, 1973, in Las Vegas.

== Career ==
Duggan was elected Allegheny County District Attorney in 1964, and re-elected in 1967 and 1971. During Duggan's 10-year tenure as DA there were few prosecutions for gambling. Duggan's predecessor in the DA's office was Democrat Edward "Easy Going Eddie" Boyle. Unlike his predecessor, Duggan was born to an affluent family, with an estate in nearby Ligonier Township, Westmoreland County.

== Indictment ==
In Duggan's third term as D.A., the Internal Revenue Service and Richard Thornburgh, then-United States Attorney for Western Pennsylvania (and later Governor of Pennsylvania and United States Attorney General), opened investigations into Duggan's sources of income and relations with criminal elements.

Thornburgh obtained an indictment on March 5, 1974. That same day, Duggan was found shot to death on his family estate in Ligonier Township, victim of a shotgun blast. The body was found on the grounds of the estate; the shotgun was seven to ten feet from the body. Duggan, authorities said, apparently had been hunting before accidentally or purposefully turning the shotgun on himself. The Pittsburgh Press asked, "Was the law closing in on Robert W. Duggan so inexorably that his only escape was suicide?"

Upon hearing the news of Duggan's death Thornburgh told a reporter, "The terrible personal tragedy overshadows every aspect of this case. Anytime a guy perceives himself to be in a position that he thinks he has to take his own life, it's very sad. I've known tragedy in my own life. I know what it is."

Doubts emerged over whether Duggan had committed suicide given the distance of the shotgun from the corpse. "You don't shoot yourself with a shotgun with your shoes on," one investigator told me, pointing out that the barrel was so long only a bare toe could have fired the trigger.

Legal offices
Preceded by Edward C. Boyle	Allegheny County District Attorney; 1964–1974	Succeeded by John Hickton
