= Port Authority Police Department (Allegheny County) =

Law enforcement agency in Allegheny County, Pennsylvania

Allegheny County Port Authority Police Department
- Abbreviation: PAPD

Agency overview
- Preceding agency: Pittsburgh Railways Police Department
- Employees: 68
- Annual budget: $4.6 million

Jurisdictional structure
- Operations jurisdiction: Allegheny County, Pennsylvania, United States
- Governing body: Port Authority Board

Operational structure
- Headquarters: 345 Sixth Avenue; Pittsburgh, PA
- Officers: 46
- Civilians: 12
- Agency executive: Matt Porter, Chief of Police
- Parent agency: Port Authority of Allegheny County
- Units: 6: Bike; Canine; Emergency Services; Plain Clothes; Collision Investigation; Digital Forensics

Facilities
- Dogs: 2

Website
- Department Website

The Port Authority Police Department is a law enforcement agency in Allegheny County, Pennsylvania. It is a transit police agency, authorized by Title 22, Chapter 33 of the Pennsylvania Consolidated Statutes, which provides policing, investigation and crime prevention services to Port Authority of Allegheny County facilities, routes, and services.

== History ==
The first officer attributed to the Port Authority Police Department, Rege Kelly, was appointed in 1968 to investigate security issues and serve as a liaison with other law enforcement agencies. At that time, patrol services were provided by the Allegheny County Sheriff's Office on a contract basis. Kelly, a retired officer of the Pittsburgh Bureau of Police, was subsequently appointed as the first Chief of Police upon the formal formation of the department.

In 1985 the Port Authority Police Department reorganized as a police department under Title 22, Chapter 33 of the Pennsylvania Consolidated Statutes. The Allegheny County Sheriff's Office withdrew all services in 1997, placing full responsibility for transit policing on the PAPD. The then Chief, William T. McArdle, directed the expansion of the department, including creation of a number of specialized units, and prioritized officer education.

The merger of the PAPD with the Allegheny County Police Department for cost-saving and oversight purposes has been explored on a number of occasions.

== Organization ==
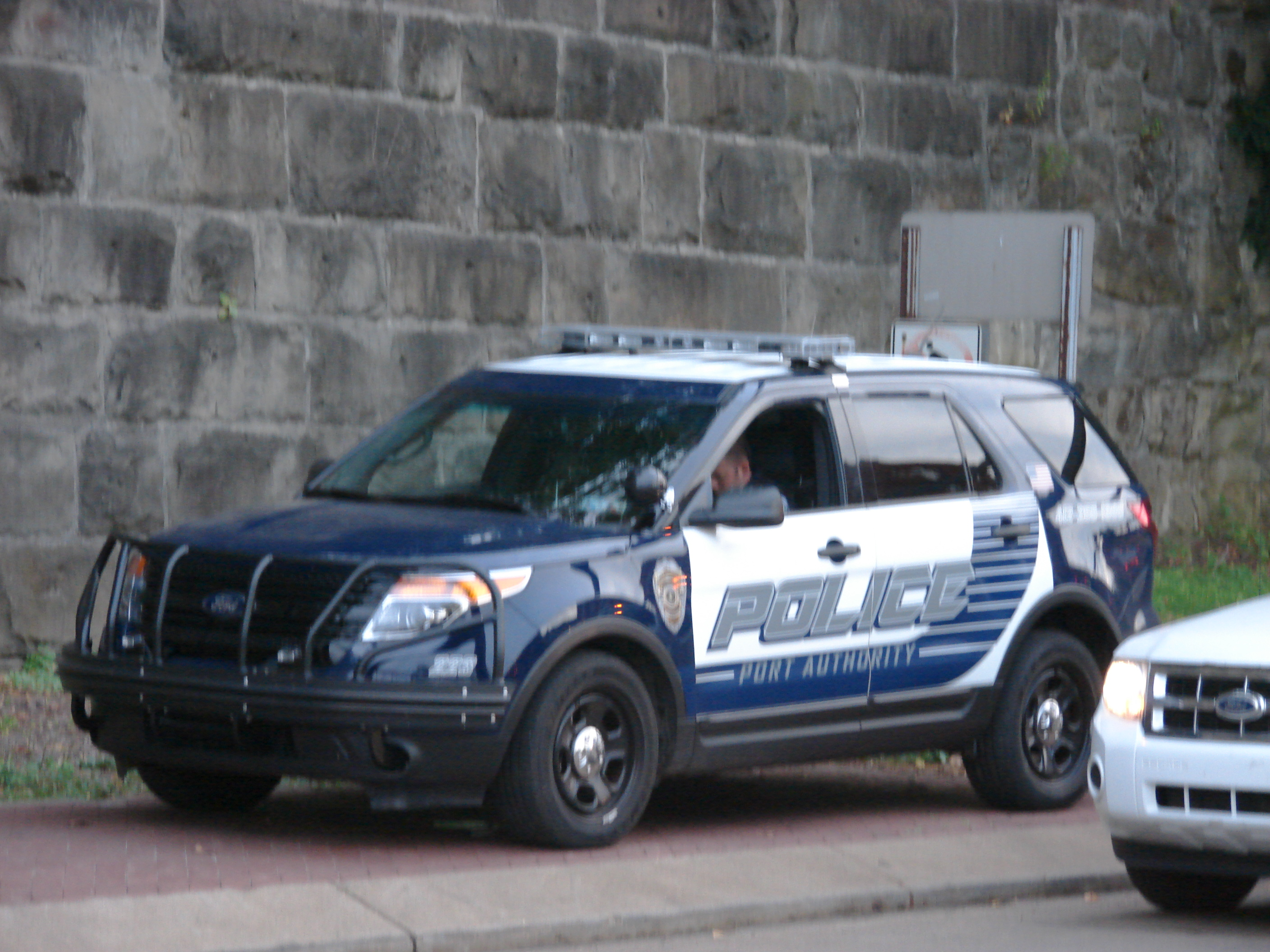
A PAPD Ford Police Interceptor Utility patrol vehicle.

The executive of the Port Authority Police Department is the Chief of Police, currently Matt Porter, and is appointed by the Port Authority of Allegheny County.

In addition to regular patrol officers which conduct foot and motor patrol, the department comprises several specialized units.

- Bike Unit - The Bike Unit provides patrol, traffic enforcement, crowd control and community relations services and are regularly deployed to Pittsburgh's central business district, Port Authority park and ride lots and pedestrian and bicycle throughways. The unit utilizes mountain bikes, and officers are certified by the International Police Mountain Bike Association.
- Emergency Services Unit - The Emergency Services Unit provides tactical, counter-terrorism, protective, hazardous materials and explosives services. Officers also conduct routine patrol duties and operate in conjunction with the Pittsburgh Bureau of Police, Allegheny County Police Department, and Pennsylvania State Police to respond to critical incidents both on and off the Port Authority system.
- Plain Clothes Unit - The Plain Clothes Unit, also referred to as the detective unit, provides investigative services for crimes which occur on or against Port Authority property. Serious offences, such as sexual assault or homicide, are referred to the Allegheny County Police Department.
- Digital Forensics Unit - Formerly the Computer Forensics Unit, the Digital Forensics Unit provides video, audio, and cell phone evidence analysis. This unit regularly assists outside agencies due to its unique specialist nature.
- Collision Investigation Unit - The Collision Investigation Unit, also referred to as the traffic or accident unit, investigates serious collisions involving Port Authority vehicles.
- Canine Unit - The Canine Unit provides patrol and explosives detection services throughout the Port Authority system.

== Vehicles ==
The PAPD utilizes the Ford Police Interceptor Utility, Chevrolet Suburban and Chevrolet Impala as marked patrol vehicles. It also operates a Chevrolet Silverado 2500HD with a utility body as the primary Emergency Services Unit vehicle. All SUVs are fitted with full-coverage wrap-round push bars for moving disabled vehicles. The department is in transition between an all white paint scheme with a blue stripe and department seal on the front doors, and a more complex blue-and-white LAPD-style color scheme featuring large lettering across both doors and the department badge on the front quarter-panel.

== See also ==
- Allegheny County Police Department
- Allegheny County Sheriff's Office
- Allegheny County Housing Authority Police Department
- Law enforcement in Pennsylvania
