= Fred Anton =

American lawyer (1934–2017)

Frederick Anton III
- Born: 1934; Philadelphia, Pennsylvania, U.S.
- Died: November 2, 2017 (aged 82–83); Philadelphia, Pennsylvania, U.S.
- Education: Villanova University (BS, LLB)
- Occupation: Lawyer

Frederick Anton III (1934 – November 2, 2017) was an American lawyer who was President and CEO of the Pennsylvania Manufacturers Association and the Pennsylvania Manufacturers Insurance Company. He was a delegate to five Republican National Conventions and was described as a central figure in Pennsylvania’s business and political networks.

== Education ==
A native of Philadelphia, Pennsylvania, he graduated from Villanova University School of Law in 1958 and practiced law in Philadelphia. In 1962, he took a job as a claims attorney with the Pennsylvania Manufactures Insurance Company, where he handled workers compensation cases. He became president of the Pennsylvania Manufactures Insurance Company in 1972 and became president of the Pennsylvania Manufactures Association in 1975.

== Career ==
As a Republican, he was a delegate to the 1992, 1996, 2000, 2004 and 2008 Republican National Conventions.

The Pennsylvania Report named him to the 2003 "The Pennsylvania Report Power 75" list of influential figures in Pennsylvania politics, calling him "an important financial player for GOP" (Republican Party) In 2009, the Pennsylvania Report named him to "The Pennsylvania Report 100" list of influential figures in Pennsylvania politics and noted that he remains a "key figure in the business community" and "[t]he "godfather" of all conservative organizations in the state." He was named to the PoliticsPA list of "Sy Snyder's Power 50" list of influential individuals in Pennsylvania politics in 2002. In 2010, he was named of the "Top 10 Republicans" in Pennsylvania by Politics Magazine, who noted that he "funds much of the conservative infrastructure in the state, such as the right of-center think-tank Commonwealth Foundation."

== Death ==
Anton was found dead in the Delaware River, near his residence, on November 2, 2017. Following his death in November 2017, media coverage described Anton as a central figure in Pennsylvania’s business and political networks. The Philadelphia Inquirer reported that he led the Pennsylvania Manufacturers Association for more than four decades and was a significant Republican donor and fundraiser. His body was recovered from the Delaware River near his Philadelphia residence.
