= Allegheny County Police Department =

County police department in Pennsylvania, U.S.

Coordinates: 40.451°N 79.898°W

- Patch of Allegheny County Police Department

- Seal of Allegheny County, Pennsylvania

- Flag of Allegheny County, Pennsylvania.svg
- Abbreviation: ACPD
- Motto: "To Serve With Honor"

Agency overview
- Formed: 1932; 94 years ago
- Employees: 216 Sworn

Jurisdictional structure
- Operations jurisdiction: Allegheny County, Pennsylvania, U.S.
- Jurisdiction of Allegheny County Police Department
- Area: 745 square miles (1,930 km^{2})
- Population: 2,681,666 (2017)
- General nature: Local civilian police

Operational structure
- Headquarters: Pittsburgh, Pennsylvania
- Police officers: 220
- Civilian employees: 55
- Agency executive: Christopher Kearns, Superintendent

Facilities
- Horses: 19

Website
- www.alleghenycounty.us/police/index.aspx

The Allegheny County Police Department is a law enforcement agency in Allegheny County, Pennsylvania. The department provides law enforcement services on County property, including the Pittsburgh International Airport, the Allegheny County Airport, and various parks. Between 2017 and 2021, the ACPD was contracted by the borough of Wilmerding. It also provides assistance to all municipal law enforcement agencies in the County, and generally investigates all serious crimes, such as homicide, except in the City of Pittsburgh.

== History ==
The Allegheny County Police Department was established in 1932 by an act of the Allegheny County Board of Commissioners and the Pennsylvania Legislature.

== Organization ==
The executive of the Allegheny County Police Department is the Superintendent, who is appointed by the County Executive, and assisted by two Assistant Superintendents. The current Superintendent is Christopher Kearns, since March 2021. The department is in turn divided into two Divisions, each commanded by an Assistant Superintendent.

=== Uniformed Division ===
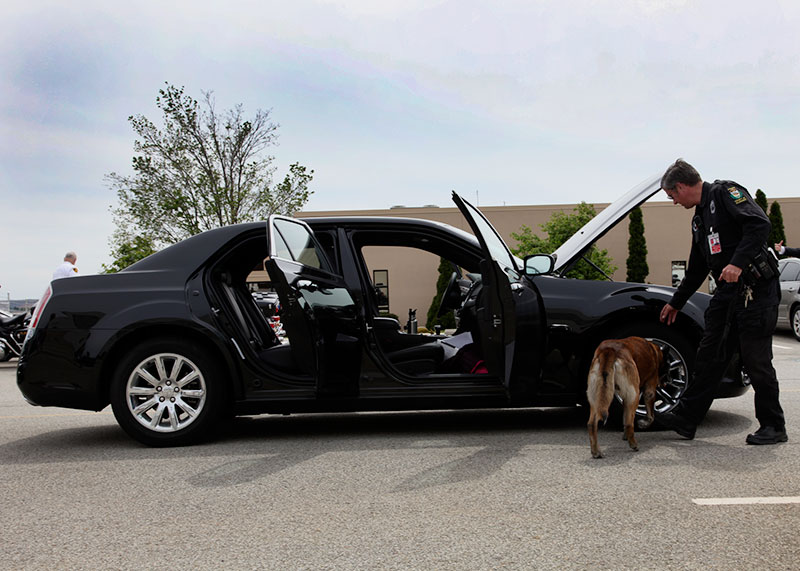
An ACPD Canine Unit officer and his dog screening a US Secret Service vehicle for explosives.

The Uniformed Division is primarily responsible for patrol of the Pittsburgh International Airport, Allegheny County Airport, nine county parks and several other county facilities and buildings.

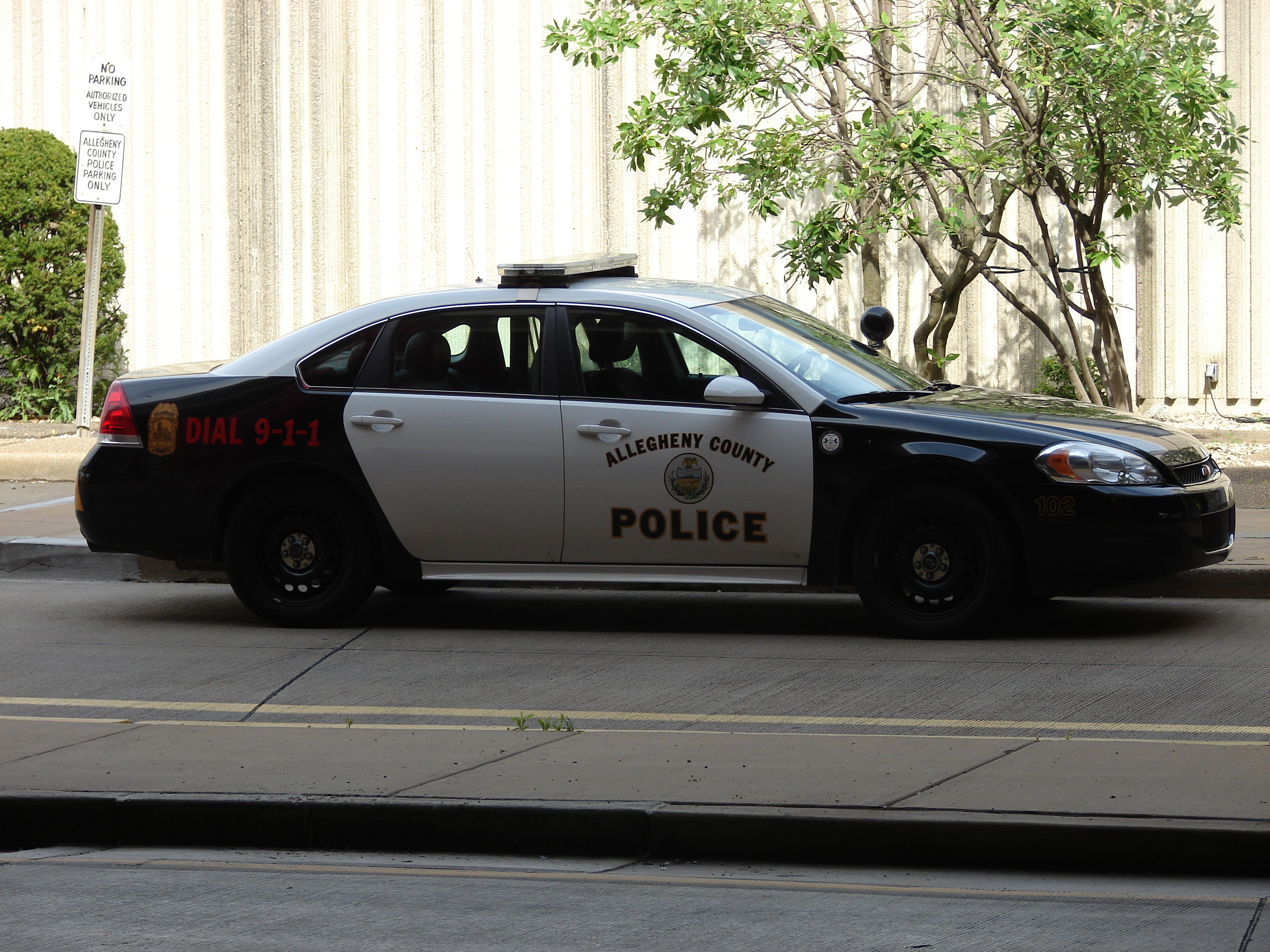
An ACPD Chevrolet Impala patrol vehicle.

- Explosive Ordnance Disposal Team
- Explosive Ordnance Disposal K-9
- Detention Services
- Narcotic Detection K-9
- Special Weapons and Tactics Team (SWAT)
- Airport Drug Interdiction Team
- Mounted Unit
- Motorcycle Detail
- Dive Unit

=== Detective Division ===
The Detective Division is primarily responsible for investigation of crimes which occur on county property, and all serious crimes which occur within municipalities.

- General Investigations
- Homicide
- Narcotics
- Executive Protection / Cold Case Squad
- Evidence Processing Unit

== Contract services ==
Between 2017 and 2021, the department provided law enforcement services to the borough of Wilmerding.

== Ranks ==
Title	Insignia
Superintendent	
Assistant Superintendent	
Inspector	
Lieutenant	
Sergeant	
Patrolman	None

== Fallen officers ==
Since the establishment of the department, three members have died in the line of duty.

== See also ==
- Allegheny County Sheriff
- Allegheny County Port Authority Police
- Allegheny County Housing Authority Police
- List of law enforcement agencies in Pennsylvania
- County police
