= Allegheny County Sheriff's Office =

Law enforcement agency that serves Allegheny County, Pennsylvania

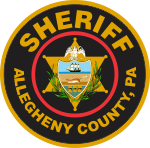
- Badge of Allegheny County Sheriff's Office
- Abbreviation: ACSO

Agency overview
- Formed: 1789; 237 years ago
- Employees: 203 (2019)
- Annual budget: US$19.7 million (2019)

Jurisdictional structure
- Operations jurisdiction: Allegheny, Pennsylvania, United States
- Area: 745 m²
- Population: 1.2 million
- Legal jurisdiction: Allegheny County, Pennsylvania
- Governing body: Allegheny County Council
- General nature: Local civilian police

Operational structure
- Headquarters: 436 Grant Street Pittsburgh, PA
- Deputies: 169
- Civilians: 34
- Agency executive: Kevin M. Kraus, Sheriff

Facilities
- Dogs: 4

Website
- http://www.sheriffalleghenycounty.com/

The Allegheny County Sheriff's Office is a law enforcement agency that serves Allegheny County, Pennsylvania, and is the largest sheriff's office in the state. The ACSO serves as a local arm of the Pennsylvania Unified Judicial System in a number of roles, including: court security, writ services, sales, prisoner transportation, issuing of firearm licenses and execution of warrants. A primary responsibility of the office is fugitive apprehension. The Sheriff's Office also assists local law enforcement agencies with emergency and incident response on an as-needed basis, most notably through the use of trained police dogs.

== Organization ==
The executive of the Allegheny County Sheriff's Office is the Sheriff, currently Kevin M. Kraus, and is an elected position. The office consists of a number of divisions:

- Administration – The Administration Division is responsible for personnel and fiscal management, scheduling and coordinating law enforcement training, information technology management and the purchase and maintenance of property.
- Investigations – The Investigations Division is primarily responsible for executing criminal warrants, as well as investigating threats to members and personnel of the judiciary.
- Civil Process – The Civil Process Division is responsible for processing and docketing civil court documents such as divorces, execution against real and personal property, orders of court and miscellaneous writs such as those filed by respondents and for transportation of prisoners.
- Firearms – The Firearms Division is responsible for issuing licenses to sell or conceal-carry firearms in accordance with the Uniform Firearms Act.
- Uniform – The Uniform Division is primarily responsible for crowd control services carnivals, festivals, parades and other special events, as well as security and traffic control as directed. It consists of
- Transportation – The Transportation Division is primarily responsible for transporting prisoners to and from prisons, courts, inquests and hospitals, transferring prisoners to house arrest and courtroom security, as well as assisting in the coordination all prisoner extraditions from other states and jurisdictions.

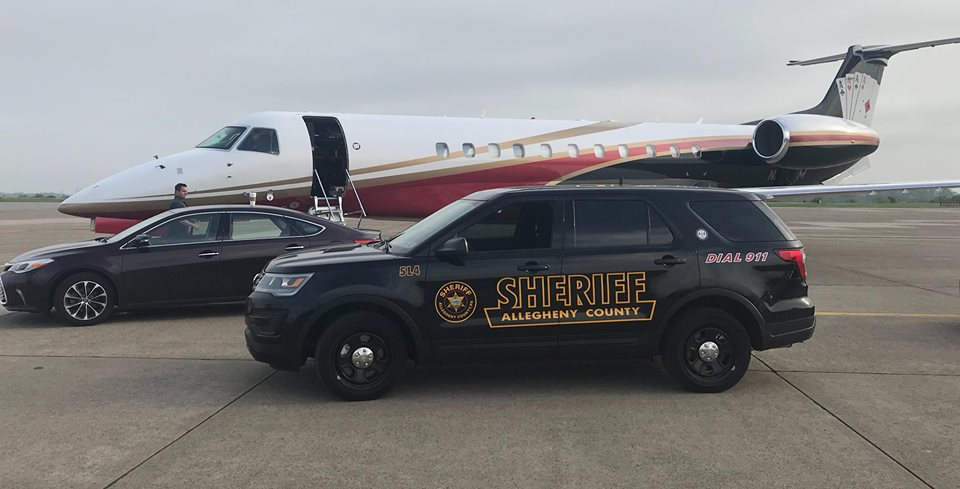
A Ford Explorer Canine Unit vehicle.

The Sheriff's Office also has a number of deputies assigned unique positions such as Evidence Management and Crime Prevention. It maintains a Canine Unit consisting of two dual-purpose bomb dogs, one dual-purpose drug dog and one single purpose tracking dog. This unit operates with no budget allocation and is funded by public donations.

The Sheriff's Reserve consists of two elements, the Uniform Division and the General Reserve. The Uniform Division is primarily responsible for crowd control services at carnivals, festivals, parades and other special events, as well as security and traffic control as directed. Deputies are sworn, carry firearms and complete an educational program. Pennsylvania Act 235 Lethal Weapons Training is a pre-requisite to joining the Sheriff's Reserve. The Uniform Division also includes a Motorcycle Unit. Each motorcycle is owned and maintained by the deputy at personal cost. The General Reserve Division consists of volunteers interested in community service. These members are not sworn and do not have powers of arrest, but support the Sheriff in community engagement.

== History ==
=== Past sheriffs ===
The first sheriff to be elected in Allegheny County was James Morrison, who took office in January 1789, soon after the United States gained independence from Great Britain in the Revolutionary War.

- James Morrison – 1789–1792
- Samuel Ewalt – 1792–1795 (PA State Representative post-Sheriff career)
- James Sample – 1795–1798
- Ephraim Jones – 1798–1801
- William Wusthoff – 1804–1809
- William McCandless – 1804–1809
- William Woods – 1809–1810
- Lazarus Stewart – 1816–1819 (Last Sheriff to conduct public hanging in Allegheny County)
- Morgan Neville – 1819–1822 (Editor and Owner of Pittsburgh Post-Gazette)
- Lazarus Stewart – 1822–1825
- William Leckey – 1825–1828
- W. Caven – 1828–1831
- William Leckey – 1831–1834
- Elijah Trovillo – 1834–1837
- Andrew Bayne – 1837–1840
- Benjamin Weaver – 1840–1843
- Elijah Trovillo – 1843–1846
- John Forsyth – 1846–1850
- Carter Curtis – 1850–1852
- William Magill – 1852–1856
- Rody Patterson – 1856–1857
- James L. Grahm – 1857–1861
- Harry Woods – 1861–1863
- John H. Stewart – 1864–1867
- Samuel Cluley – 1867–1870
- H.S. Fleming – 1870–1873 (Served several terms on Council of the City of Allegheny [Northside neighborhood of Pittsburgh], Mayor of Allegheny, Treasurer of Allegheny County)
- John H. Hare – 1873–1875
- Richard H. Fife – 1876–1878
- T.H. Hunter – 1879–1882 (Civil War veteran)
- William McCallin – 1882–1884
- Joseph H. Gray – 1884–1888
- A. McCandless – 1888–1890
- William H. McCleary – 1890–1894
- James F. Richards – 1894–1896
- Harvey A. Lowry – 1896–1900
- William C. McKinley – 1900–1904
- James W. Dickson – 1904–1906
- Addison Gumbert – 1906–1910 (former Major League Baseball pitcher, Clerk of Common Pleas, Commissioner of Allegheny County)
- Judd H. Bruff – 1910–1914
- George Richards – 1914–1918
- William S. Haddock – 1918–1922 (president of the United States Amateur Hockey Association)
- Robert Woodside – 1922–1926
- Robert H. Braun – 1926–1930
- Robert S. Cain – 12/1930-1/1932
- Frank I. Gollmar – 1932–1938 (Judge of the Court of Common Pleas of Allegheny County)
- H. J. Heinz II – 1938–1942 (4 years, known as John Heinz in this period; later CEO of H.J. Heinz Company)
- Robert J. Corbett – 1942–1944 (3 years, elected to Congress 1944)
- John Montgomery – 1944–1945 (1 year, appointed by Governor)
- Walter C. Monaghan – 1946–1951 (5 years, died September 19, 1951)
- William D. McClelland – 1951 (acted in this position from September 19, 1951 – December 28, 1951, while he also served as Coroner)
- Thomas E. Whitten December 28, 1951 – 1954 (3 years)
- William H. Davis 1954–1970 (16 years, City of Pittsburgh Fire Chief and City Councilman)
- Eugene L. Coon 1970–1997 (27 Years, Longest tenured Allegheny County Sheriff)
- Peter DeFazio 1997–2006 (9 years)
- William P. Mullen 2006–2022 (16 Years)
- Kevin M. Kraus 2022–Present (4th year)

== Controversies ==
In July 2018, clerk Erika Romanowski was charged with federal obstruction of justice and making false statements to federal investigators. She was alleged to have disclosed sensitive law enforcement information to two "personal associates" who were targets of a federal investigation into a large-scale, drug trafficking organization. Romanowski also allegedly lied to Federal Bureau of Investigation agents when questioned, and harmed their ongoing investigation. Her prosecution is considered part of the U.S. Attorney’s public corruption initiative.

In May 2018, Deputy Donald Modrick was charged with theft, unsworn falsification and obstructing the administration of law after stealing $10,000 from a defendant. Modrick allegedly collected money without following any procedure and had checks written out in his name, which he then cashed for personal use. He was terminated by the Sheriff's Office.

== Fallen deputies ==
Since the establishment of the office, seven deputies have died in the line of duty.

== See also ==
- List of law enforcement agencies in Pennsylvania
