= 1955–56 Dumbarton F.C. season =

Dumbarton
1955–1956 season
- Manager: Peter McGown
- Stadium: Boghead Park, Dumbarton
- Scottish League B Division: 4th
- Scottish Cup: Fourth round
- Scottish League Cup: Quarter-final
- Top goalscorer: League: Hugh Gallacher (36); All: Hugh Gallacher (46)
Home colours

The 1955–56 season was the 72nd Scottish football season in which Dumbarton competed at national level, entering the Scottish Football League, the Scottish Cup and the Scottish League Cup. In addition Dumbarton competed in the Stirlingshire Cup.

== Scottish League ==
The return to the 'top' divisions in Scottish League football was a success in many ways with Dumbarton always challenging the top places in the Second Division throughout the campaign - but eventually had to settle for a 4th place out of 19, only 7 points behind champions Queen's Park (and just 4 short of a promotion place).

24 August 1955 Division B	Alloa Athletic	3–3	Dumbarton	Recreation Park, Alloa
	Grant 6'; Dignam 11'; McGovern 71'		Whalen 53'; Gallacher, H 56', 70'	Referee: J Leckie

10 September 1955 Division B	Dumbarton	3–1	Cowdenbeath	Boghead Park
	Gallacher, H 14', 77'; McCall 43' (pen.)		Quinn 27'	Attendance: 3,000; Referee: A McLintock

21 September 1955 Division B	Dumbarton	3–2	Berwick Rangers	Boghead Park
	Gallacher, H 54', 79'; Glover 83'		Paterson 12', 78'	Referee: D Weir

24 September 1955 Division B	Dumbarton	5–1	East Stirling	Boghead Park
	Gallacher, H 42', 44'; Heaney 49'; Brooks 56'; Brown 69'		Allan 65'	Attendance: 3,000; Referee: W Brittle

28 September 1955 Division B	Hamilton	0–2	Dumbarton	Douglas Park
			Gallacher, H 45'; Brown 78'	Attendance: 3,000; Referee: R Smith

15 October 1955 Division B	Dumbarton	0–2	Queen's Park	Boghead Park
			Church 40'; Omand 89'	Attendance: 7,000; Referee: W Harvey

29 October 1955 Division B	Arbroath	0–1	Dumbarton	Gayfield Park
			McDonald 35'	Attendance: 3,000; Referee: J Fulton

5 November 1955 Division B	Dumbarton	3–2	Albion Rovers	Boghead Park
	Cairns 40'; Whalen 47'; Gallacher, H 84'		Glancy 8', 51'	Referee: W Syme

12 November 1955 Division B	Ayr United	5–1	Dumbarton	Somerset Park
	Price 7'; Beattie 50', 66', 79'; Stevenson 89'		Glover 8'	Attendance: 6,000; Referee: H Phillips

19 November 1955 Division B	Dumbarton	5–2	Stranraer	Boghead Park
	Whalen 33', 64', 65'; Gallacher, H 45'; Glover 57'		McCutcheon 29' (pen.), 62'	Attendance: 2,600; Referee: R Morris

26 November 1955 Division B	Dumbarton	2–0	Morton	Boghead Park
	Gallacher, H 64'; Lewis 83' (o.g.)			Attendance: 5,000; Referee: P Fitzpatrick

3 December 1955 Division B	Third Lanark	1–0	Dumbarton	Cathkin Park
	Gray 60'			Attendance: 8,000; Referee: I Inglis

10 December 1955 Division B	Dumbarton	4–1	Montrose	Boghead Park
	Gallacher, H 2'; Wannen 21' (o.g.); McDonald 37', 60'		Soutar 75'	Attendance: 2,500; Referee: R Davidson

17 December 1955 Division B	Stenhousemuir	2–3	Dumbarton	Ochilview Park
	Kilgannon		Gallacher, H 6' 15'	Referee: H Spence

24 December 1955 Division B	Forfar Athletic	1–5	Dumbarton	Station Park, Forfar
	Martin 54'		Whalen 5'; Gallacher, H 30', 56', 77'; Brooks 79'	Attendance: 1,000; Referee: W Davidson

31 December 1955 Division B	Dumbarton	2–0	Dundee United	Boghead Park
	Gallacher, H 73', 78'			Attendance: 5,500; Referee: A McClintock

2 January 1956 Division B	East Stirling	3–1	Dumbarton	Firs Park
	Newman; Smith 75' (pen.), 85'		McDonald	Referee: F Crossley

3 January 1956 Division B	Dumbarton	2–1	Hamilton	Boghead Park
	Gallacher, H 17', 34'		Richmond	Attendance: 5,000; Referee: R Morris

7 January 1956 Division B	Dumbarton	0–2	St Johnstone	Boghead Park
			Fraser 37'; Carr 57'	Attendance: 5,000; Referee: T Wharton

14 January 1956 Division B	Cowdenbeath	2–6	Dumbarton	Central Park, Cowdenbeath
	McArthur 3'; Ross 38'		Gallacher, H 5'; McDonald 13'; Whalen 30'; McKeown 32', 89'	Attendance: 2,500; Referee: P Fitzpatrick

28 January 1956 Division B	Brechin City	0–2	Dumbarton	Glebe Park, Brechin
			McKeown 24', 26'	Attendance: 2,100; Referee: W Brittle

11 February 1956 Division B	Queen's Park	7–0	Dumbarton	Hampden Park
	McLean 21', 28'; Devine 23', 45', 52', 89'; Omand 43'			Attendance: 17,240; Referee: H Phillips

18 February 1956 Division B	Dumbarton	5–1	Forfar Athletic	Boghead Park
	McKeown 25', 71', 88'; Brown 68'; Gallacher, H 86'		Dunn 27'	Attendance: 4,000; Referee: G Mitchell

25 February 1956 Division B	Berwick Rangers	2–2	Dumbarton	Shielfield Park
	Airlie 10'; Runciman 89' (pen.)		Gallacher, H 63'; Whalen 75'	Attendance: 2,000; Referee: D McTaggart

3 March 1956 Division B	Dumbarton	1–1	Arbroath	Boghead Park
	Gallacher, H 5'		Smith 14'	Attendance: 4,000; Referee: J Fitzpatrick

10 March 1956 Division B	Albion Rovers	0–1	Dumbarton	Cliftonhill Stadium
			McKeown 89'	Attendance: 3,000; Referee: W Syme

17 March 1956 Division B	Dumbarton	3–3	Ayr United	Boghead Park
	Heaney 4', 89'; Gallacher, H 65'		Beattie 3'; McMillan 14'; Stevenson 60'	Attendance: 7,000; Referee: J Inglis

24 March 1956 Division B	Stranraer	2–1	Dumbarton	Stair Park
	Henderson; Carr 48'		Gallacher, H 57'	Referee: T Wharton

31 March 1956 Division B	Morton	1–2	Dumbarton	Cappielow Park
	Shaw 44'		Gallacher, H 2', 73'	Attendance: 6,000; Referee: R Davidson

2 April 1956 Division B	St Johnstone	2–1	Dumbarton	Muirton Park
	Montgomery 1'; Carr 27'		Bradley 83'	Attendance: 9,000; Referee: J Devine

7 April 1956 Division B	Dumbarton	2–3	Third Lanark	Boghead Park
	Cornock 12'; McCall 79' (pen.)		Craig 49'; Wark 50'; Brolis 82'	Attendance: 5,000; Referee: D Weir

13 April 1956 Division B	Dumbarton	1–4	Brechin City	Boghead Park
	Bell 72'		Duncan 3', 54'; Muir 24'; Selway 85'	Referee: G Bowman

18 April 1956 Division B	Montrose	1–4	Dumbarton	Links Park
	Gordon 64'		Bryceland 13'; Glover 20'; Gallacher, H 63', 68'	Referee: WD Liston

21 April 1956 Division B	Dumbarton	2–1	Stenhousemuir	Boghead Park
	Glover 2'; Gallacher, H 13'		Tasker 74' (pen.)	Attendance: 4,000; Referee: H Spence

25 April 1956 Division B	Dundee United	1–1	Dumbarton	Tannadice Park
	Coyle, J (pen.)		Gallacher, H	Attendance: 3,000

28 April 1956 Division B	Dumbarton	4–2	Alloa Athletic	Boghead Park
	Heaney 16'; Whalen; Gallacher, H Bryceland		Kidd; Walls 83'	Referee: F Crossley

== Scottish Cup ==
Dumbarton negotiated a tricky tie against Highland League opposition in the third round of the Cup, before losing out to Dundee United in the next round.

8 October 1955 Round 3	Dumbarton	5–3	Inverness Caledonian	Boghead Park
	Gallacher, H 15', 88'; Brown 20', 43'; Brooks 66'		McKenzie 89'; Baillie 70'	Attendance: 5,000; Referee: A McLintock

22 October 1955 Round 4	Dundee United	4–1	Dumbarton	Tannadice Park
	Aikman 6'; Milne 67'; Reid 80'; Coyle, J 82'		Gallacher, H 31'	Attendance: 12,000; Referee: J Bissett

== Scottish League Cup ==
For the first time, Dumbarton qualified from their League Cup section, winning 3 and drawing the other of their 4 matches. In a play off, Morton were seen off - before Division A St Mirren were to prove to be too much for them in the quarter-final.

13 August 1955 Section 9	Dumbarton	2–0	Berwick Rangers	Boghead Park
	Gallacher, H 84'; Whalen 88'			Attendance: 5,000; Referee: R Morris

20 August 1955 Section 9	Montrose	0–2	Dumbarton	Links Park
			Whalen 16'; Gallacher, H 67' (pen.)	Attendance: 2,000; Referee: J Devine

27 August 1955 Section 9	Stranraer	3–3	Dumbarton	Stair Park
	McCutcheon 12'; McMaster; Gilroy		Whalen; Gallacher, H 56'	Referee: P Fitzpatrick

3 September 1955 Section 9	Dumbarton	6–1	East Stirling	Boghead Park
	Glover 5'; Whalen 26' (pen.) 39' 43' (pen.); Gallacher, H 82'		Smith 10'	Attendance: 6,000; Referee: H Gallacher

6 September 1955 Playoff First leg	Dumbarton	2–1	Morton	Boghead Park
	Gallacher, H 11'; Whalen 21'		Fleming 90'	Attendance: 7,000; Referee: P Fitzpatrick

8 September 1955 Playoff Second leg	Morton	0–1 (1-3 agg.)	Dumbarton	Cappielow Park
			Gallacher, H 17'	Attendance: 7,000; Referee: P Fitzpatrick

14 September 1955 QF First leg	St Mirren	5–1	Dumbarton	Love Street (stadium)
	Gallacher, J 20' (o.g.); Stariton 22', 75'; Gemmell 73'; Laird 82'		Whalen 88'	Attendance: 15,000; Referee: H Gallacher

17 September 1955 QF Second leg	Dumbarton	1–1 (2-6 agg.)	St Mirren	Boghead Park
	Glover 83'		Straiton 76'	Attendance: 6,000; Referee: W Syme

== Stirlingshire Cup ==
The county cup semi final tie was a thriller, where Dumbarton lost by the odd goal in 11 against A Division opponents Falkirk.

21 March 1956 Semi-final	Falkirk	6–5	Dumbarton	Brockville Park
	O'Hara (pen.) (pen.); Morrison; Thomson; Wright		Gallacher, H Whalen; McKeown	Referee: Mr Mitchell

== Friendlies ==
1 October 1955 Friendly	Dumbarton	1–2	Queens Park	Boghead Park
	Trialist 84'		Devine 14'; Nelson	Referee: J Pidgeon

21 January 1956 Friendly	Dumbarton	6–1	Carluke Rovers	Boghead Park
	Brooks 10', 22', 55'; McKay 54'; Whalen; McDonald		Morton 89'	Attendance: 1,000; Referee: J McLintock

6 May 1956 Friendly	Renfrew	1–2	Dumbarton	Western Park, Renfrew
	Goal		Gallacher, H	Attendance: 2,500

== Player statistics ==
No.	Pos	Nat	Player	Total		Second Division		Scottish Cup		League Cup	
No.	Pos	Nat	Player	Apps	Goals	Apps	Goals	Apps	Goals	Apps	Goals
	GK	(Scotland) SCO	Des McLean	3	0	3	0	0	0	0	0
	GK	(Scotland) SCO	Eddie O'Donnell	11	0	11	0	0	0	0	0
	GK	(Scotland) SCO	Jimmy Ritchie	32	0	22	0	2	0	8	0
	DF	(Scotland) SCO	A Aitken	1	0	1	0	0	0	0	0
	DF	(Scotland) SCO	Joe Gallacher	35	0	28	0	2	0	5	0
	DF	(Scotland) SCO	Jim Gray	7	0	4	0	0	0	3	0
	DF	(Scotland) SCO	John McKay	44	0	33	0	3	0	8	0
	MF	(Scotland) SCO	Willie Box	2	0	2	0	0	0	0	0
	MF	(Scotland) SCO	Benny Cairns	31	1	30	1	1	0	0	0
	MF	(Scotland) SCO	Don Cornock	36	1	27	1	1	0	8	0
	MF	(Scotland) SCO	Tommy Craig	1	0	1	0	0	0	0	0
	MF	(Scotland) SCO	Joe Harvey	35	0	25	0	2	0	8	0
	MF	(Scotland) SCO	Tommy Irwin	6	0	6	0	0	0	0	0
	MF	(Scotland) SCO	John McCall	41	2	31	2	2	0	8	0
	FW	(Scotland) SCO	John Adams	1	0	1	0	0	0	0	0
	FW	(Scotland) SCO	Tommy Bell	1	1	1	1	0	0	0	0
	FW	(Scotland) SCO	Jimmy Bradley	2	1	2	1	0	0	0	0
	FW	(Scotland) SCO	John Brooks	15	3	12	2	2	1	1	0
	FW	(Scotland) SCO	Les Brown	26	5	17	3	2	2	7	0
	FW	(Scotland) SCO	Sam Bryceland	4	2	4	2	0	0	0	0
	FW	(Scotland) SCO	John Callan	4	0	4	0	0	0	0	0
	FW	(Scotland) SCO	Hugh Gallacher	46	46	36	36	2	3	8	7
	FW	(Scotland) SCO	John Gallagher	8	1	8	1	0	0	0	0
	FW	(Scotland) SCO	John Glover	28	7	18	5	2	0	8	2
	FW	(Scotland) SCO	John Heaney	27	5	18	4	2	0	7	1
	FW	(Scotland) SCO	Gerry McCaffrey	2	0	2	0	0	0	0	0
	FW	(Scotland) SCO	Jimmy McDonald	16	5	15	5	0	0	1	0
	FW	(Scotland) SCO	Billy McKeown	12	8	12	8	0	0	0	0
	FW	(Scotland) SCO	Tom Whalen	30	17	22	9	0	0	8	8

=== Transfers ===
Amongst those players joining and leaving the club were the following:

==== Players in ====
Player	From	Date
(Scotland) John Glover	(Scotland) Kilsyth Rangers	2 Jul 1955
(Scotland) Tom Whalen	(Scotland) Duntocher Hibs	4 Aug 1955
(Scotland) Joe Harvey	(Scotland) Renfrew	7 Aug 1955
(Scotland) John Brooks	(Scotland) Clyde	10 Sep 1955
(Scotland) Benny Cairns	(Scotland) Airdrie	12 Oct 1955
(Scotland) Eddie O'Donnell	(Scotland) Port Glasgow	10 Aug 1954
(Scotland) Billy McKeown	(Scotland) Renfrew	21 Jan 1956

==== Players out ====
Player	To	Date
(Scotland) John Brooks	(Scotland) Freed	30 Apr 1956
(Scotland) Don Cornock	(Scotland) Freed	30 Apr 1956
(Scotland) Tommy Irwin	(Scotland) Freed	30 Apr 1956
(Scotland) Jimmy McDonald	(Scotland) Freed	30 Apr 1956
(Scotland) Jimmy Ritchie	(Scotland) Freed	30 Apr 1956

== Reserve team ==
Dumbarton only played one official 'reserve' match in the Second XI Cup, losing in the first round to Partick Thistle.
