= 1956–57 Dumbarton F.C. season =

Dumbarton
1956–1957 season
- Manager: Peter McGown
- Stadium: Boghead Park, Dumbarton
- Scottish League Division 2: 9th
- Scottish Cup: Seventh round
- Scottish League Cup: Prelims
- Top goalscorer: League: Hugh Gallacher (28); All: Hugh Gallacher (37)
Home colours

The 1956–57 season was the 73rd football season in which Dumbarton competed at a Scottish national level, entering the Scottish Football League, the Scottish Cup and the Scottish League Cup. In addition Dumbarton competed in the Stirlingshire Cup.

== Scottish League ==
By coming so close to promotion the previous season, confidence was high to mount a serious challenge on the Division 2 title. However, despite breaking the 100 goals scored in a league season for the first time, the 70 against was never going to be 'championship material' and only a 9th place was achieved with 38 points, 26 behind runaway winners Clyde.

22 August 1956 Division 2	Cowdenbeath	2–1	Dumbarton	Central Park, Cowdenbeath
	Murray; Gilfillan 80'		Whalen	Referee: A Crossman

5 September 1956 Division 2	Dumbarton	2–0	Hamilton	Boghead Park
	Gallacher, H 10'; McKeown 41'			Attendance: 5,000; Referee: R Smith

8 September 1956 Division 2	Stenhousemuir	1–3	Dumbarton	Ochilview Park
	Jackson 43'		Brown 8', 10'; Whalen 61'	Attendance: 2,500; Referee: P Crossley

12 September 1956 Division 2	Hamilton	1–1	Dumbarton	Douglas Park
	Woods 80'		Rollo (pen.)	Attendance: 5,000; Referee: P Crossley

15 September 1956 Division 2	Dumbarton	3–2	East Stirling	Boghead Park
	Hunter 28'; Kiernan 44', 57'		Forsyth 6'; Mooney 15'	Attendance: 4,000; Referee: W Brittle

19 September 1956 Division 2	Dumbarton	2–3	Cowdenbeath	Boghead Park
	Kiernan 60'; Hunter 62'		Beckett 44'; Stewart 68'; Quinn 75'	Referee: R Rodger

22 September 1956 Division 2	Stirling Albion	3–1	Dumbarton	Annfield Stadium
	Smith 14'; Ritchie 64'; Philiben 88'		Hunter 66'	Attendance: 5,500; Referee: W Davidson

29 September 1956 Division 2	Dumbarton	4–0	Berwick Rangers	Boghead Park
	Whalen 33'; Kiernan 48'; Glover 80'; Brown 85'			Attendance: 4,300; Referee: R Davidson

6 October 1956 Division 2	Stranraer	5–4	Dumbarton	Stair Park
	Crow 11'; King 34'; Small 25'; McCutcheon 38', 61'		Kiernan 13', 53', 83'; Wilson 75' (o.g.)	Attendance: 2,200; Referee: J Mackie

13 October 1956 Division 2	Dumbarton	0–1	Third Lanark	Boghead Park
			McInnes 27'	Attendance: 6,000; Referee: W Liston

20 October 1956 Division 2	Dumbarton	2–3	Clyde	Boghead Park
	Gallacher, H 30'; Rollo 58' (pen.)		Keogh 8', 77'; Innes 25'	Attendance: 8,000; Referee: R Yacamini

29 October 1956 Division 2	Arbroath	3–2	Dumbarton	Gayfield Park
	Fernie 6'; Gunn 9'; McGrory 13'		Gallacher, H 7', 61'	Attendance: 2,700; Referee: J Devine

3 November 1956 Division 2	Forfar Athletic	0–2	Dumbarton	Station Park, Forfar
			Gallacher, H 28'; Gallagher 75'	Attendance: 1,600; Referee: R Morris

10 November 1956 Division 2	Dumbarton	2–2	Brechin City	Boghead Park
	Cairns 25'; Whalen 29'		Gray 26'; Warrander 84'	Attendance: 5,000; Referee: H Spence

17 November 1956 Division 2	Dumbarton	7–0	Montrose	Boghead Park
	Heaney 13'; Auld 22', 69'; Brown 32', 33', 53'; Craig 55'			Attendance: 3,500; Referee: W Harvey

24 November 1956 Division 2	Morton	1–1	Dumbarton	Cappielow Park
	Shaw 88'		Gallacher, H 16'	Attendance: 2,000; Referee: D McTaggart

8 December 1956 Division 2	Dumbarton	3–2	Dundee United	Boghead Park
	Auld 9', 60'; Brown 54'		Milne 23'; Watt 38'	Attendance: 5,000; Referee: T Wharton

15 December 1956 Division 2	Alloa Athletic	2–3	Dumbarton	Recreation Park, Alloa
	Docherty; Dignam		Gallacher, H Brown

22 December 1956 Division 2	Dumbarton	8–1	Albion Rovers	Boghead Park
	Gallacher, H 15', 28', 36', 55', 83'; Brown 48'; Heaney 81'; Auld 83'		McKenna 42'	Referee: T Edwards

29 December 1956 Division 2	Clyde	5–3	Dumbarton	Shawfield Stadium
	Innes 10', 50'; Ring 77'; Granville 81'; Craig 84' (o.g.)		Heaney 3'; Gallacher, H 52'; Auld 70'	Attendance: 9,000; Referee: J Mowat

1 January 1957 Division 2	Dumbarton	1–3	Stirling Albion	Boghead Park
	Whalen 54'		Pattison; Grant 56', 57'	Attendance: 5,000; Referee: A McLintock

2 January 1957 Division 2	East Stirling	3–2	Dumbarton	Firs Park
	Forsyth, D		Cairns; Brown	Referee: H Spence

5 January 1957 Division 2	Dumbarton	6–2	Stenhousemuir	Boghead Park
	Gibson 8'; Gallacher, H 32'; Brown 39', 51', 53'; Kiernan 75'		Jack 38', 88'	Attendance: 4,000; Referee: H Gallacher

12 January 1957 Division 2	Berwick Rangers	1–0	Dumbarton	Shielfield Park
	Campbell 33'			Attendance: 1,100; Referee: J Bissett

19 January 1957 Division 2	Dumbarton	4–1	Stranraer	Boghead Park
	Kiernan 10'; Brown 17'; Gallacher, H 54', 80'		Miller 16'	Attendance: 4,000; Referee: W Brittle

26 January 1957 Division 2	Third Lanark	7–0	Dumbarton	Cathkin Park
	Allan 10'; Herbert 11'; Walker 36', 39', 70'; Craig 75', 78'			Attendance: 6,000; Referee: F Crossley

9 February 1957 Division 2	Dumbarton	4–1	St Johnstone	Boghead Park
	McKeown 9'; Gallacher, H 32'; Gallagher 54'; Brown 67'		Palmer 71' (pen.)	Attendance: 5,000; Referee: R Rodger

6 March 1957 Division 2	Dumbarton	3–1	Arbroath	Boghead Park
	Gallacher, H 30'; Auld 57'; Gibson 59'		Vandermotten 75'	Attendance: 3,000

9 March 1957 Division 2	Brechin City	4–1	Dumbarton	Glebe Park, Brechin
	Warrander 60' 81'; Stormont 62'; Scott 65'		Rollo 30'	Attendance: 1,750; Referee: H Phillips

16 March 1957 Division 2	Montrose	1–6	Dumbarton	Links Park
	Kiddle 85'		Brown 4'; Gallacher, H 14'; Gallagher 32'; Gibson 33'; Auld 41'; Rollo 90'	Attendance: 1,800; Referee: W Syme

23 March 1957 Division 2	Dumbarton	2–2	Morton	Boghead Park
	Brown 6'; Gallacher, H 48'		Gourlay 43'; Newman 56'	Attendance: 5,000; Referee: A McLintock

10 April 1957 Division 2	Dumbarton	5–1	Forfar Athletic	Boghead Park
	Gallacher, H 41'; Cairns 60'; Brown 74'; McKeown 83'; Gibson 85'		Ogilvie 35'	Referee: W Brittle

13 April 1957 Division 2	Dumbarton	5–0	Alloa Athletic	Boghead Park
	Gallacher, H 5', 71'; Gibson 13', 38'; Brown 61'			Referee: R Rodger

17 April 1957 Division 2	Dundee United	3–1	Dumbarton	Tannadice Park
	Coyle; McDonald		Hamilton (o.g.)	Attendance: 1,500; Referee: J Barclay

20 April 1957 Division 2	Albion Rovers	3–1	Dumbarton	Cliftonhill Stadium
	Carson 15'; Houston 27' (pen.); McKay 78'		McCall 50' (pen.)	Referee: P Fitzpatrick

24 April 1957 Division 2	St Johnstone	0–6	Dumbarton	Muirton Park
			Gallacher, H Gibson; McKeown	Attendance: 2,000; Referee: W Liston

== Scottish Cup ==
In the Cup, Dumbarton dispatched two Division 1 clubs en route to the quarter-finals, where Raith Rovers were to prove too strong.

2 February 1957 Round 5	Queen of the South	2–2	Dumbarton	Palmerston Park
	McGill 4'; Black 82'		Gallacher, H 32'; Brown 40'	Attendance: 7,199; Referee: F Crossley

6 February 1957 Round 5R	Dumbarton	4–2	Queen of the South	Boghead Park
	Whalen 10'; McCall 41'; Gibson 44'; Gallacher, H 80'		McMillan 17'; Oakes 30'	Attendance: 5,799; Referee: F Crossley

16 February 1957 Round 6	Motherwell	1–3	Dumbarton	fir Park
	Gardinaer 15'		Gibson 36', 89'; Cairns 72' (pen.)	Attendance: 16,000; Referee: D Gerrard

2 March 1957 Round 7	Dumbarton	0–4	Raith Rovers	Boghead Park
			Kelly 20'; Copland 63', 79'; McEwan 67'	Attendance: 18,001; Referee: H Phillips

== Scottish League Cup ==
Dumbarton failed to qualify from their section in the League Cup, although it was their poor home performances which were to count against them this season.

11 August 1956 Section 5	Dumbarton	1–8	Brechin City	Boghead Park
	Gallacher, H 40'		Selway 33' 55' 89'; Warrander 38'; Muir 53', 63', 64'	Attendance: 6,000; Referee: G Fitzgerald

15 August 1956 Section 5	Hamilton	5–3	Dumbarton	Douglas Park
	Woods 24'; Currie 77'; Armit 79', 80'; Sharp 89'		Gallacher, H 10' 41'; Whalen 40'	Referee: G Mitchell

18 August 1956 Section 5	Dumbarton	1–1	Alloa Athletic	Boghead Park
	Gallacher,H 25'		Docherty 45'	Referee: A McLintock

25 August 1956 Section 5	Brechin City	3–4	Dumbarton	Glebe Park, Brechin
	Muir 23'; Duncan 40' (pen.); Selway 80'		Hunter 30'; Gallacher, H 61', 88'; McCall 79'	Attendance: 1,700; Referee: H Gallacher

29 August 1956 Section 5	Dumbarton	3–4	Hamilton	Boghead Park
	Whalen 42', 66', 82'		Quinn 6' (pen.), 22' (pen.); Thomson 65'; Armit	Attendance: 5,000; Referee: R Morris

1 September 1956 Section 5	Alloa Athletic	1–3	Dumbarton	Recreation Park, Alloa
	Wales 52'		Gallacher, H 30'; Rollo 57' (pen.); Glover	Referee: J Mackie

== Stirlingshire Cup ==
With an aggregate win over Alloa Athletic in the final, the county cup returned to Dumbarton for the second time.

Semi-final	Falkirk	WO	Dumbarton

29 April 1957 Final First leg	Dumbarton	4–2	Alloa Athletic	Boghead Park
	Auld 41'; Gallacher, H Whalen		Dignam 46'; Miller 56'	Referee: G Bowman

30 April 1957 Final Second leg	Alloa Athletic	1–1 (3-5 agg.)	Dumbarton	Recreation Park, Alloa
	Goal		Gallacher, H

== Friendlies ==
23 January 1957 Friendly	Dumbarton	2–5	Celtic	Boghead Park
	Gallacher, H 15', 35'		McPhail 18'; Mochan 16', 18'; Tully 85'	Attendance: 7,000; Referee: W Syme

1 April 1957 Friendly	Dumbarton	2–2	Combined Services XI	Boghead Park
	Gallacher, H 53', 68'		McCrae 5'; Dickson 34'	Referee: G Bowman

== Player statistics ==
No.	Pos	Nat	Player	Total		Second Division		Scottish Cup		League Cup	
No.	Pos	Nat	Player	Apps	Goals	Apps	Goals	Apps	Goals	Apps	Goals
	GK	(Scotland) SCO	Tommy McCulloch	1	0	1	0	0	0	0	0
	GK	(Scotland) SCO	Alex McNeill	9	0	6	0	0	0	3	0
	GK	(Scotland) SCO	Eddie O'Donnell	36	0	29	0	4	0	3	0
	DF	(Scotland) SCO	Joe Gallacher	15	0	11	0	0	0	4	0
	DF	(Scotland) SCO	John McKay	43	0	35	0	4	0	4	0
	DF	(Scotland) SCO	Willie Neilson	3	0	0	0	0	0	3	0
	DF	(Scotland) SCO	Alex Rollo	41	5	32	4	4	0	5	1
	MF	(Scotland) SCO	Benny Cairns	40	5	32	4	4	1	4	0
	MF	(Scotland) SCO	Tommy Craig	41	1	33	1	4	0	4	0
	MF	(Scotland) SCO	Jim Hunter	22	4	17	3	0	0	5	1
	MF	(Scotland) SCO	Jimmy Mann	1	0	1	0	0	0	0	0
	MF	(Scotland) SCO	John McCall	40	3	31	1	4	1	5	1
	FW	(Scotland) SCO	Bertie Auld	16	8	15	8	0	0	1	0
	FW	(Scotland) SCO	Les Brown	39	20	30	19	4	1	5	0
	FW	(Scotland) SCO	Hugh Gallacher	39	37	29	28	4	2	6	7
	FW	(Scotland) SCO	John Gallagher	16	4	13	4	2	0	1	0
	FW	(Scotland) SCO	Bobby Gibson	20	11	16	8	4	3	0	0
	FW	(Scotland) SCO	John Glover	8	2	7	1	0	0	1	1
	FW	(Scotland) SCO	John Heaney	16	3	12	3	4	0	0	0
	FW	(Scotland) SCO	Hendry	1	0	1	0	0	0	0	0
	FW	(Scotland) SCO	Felix Kiernan	11	8	11	8	0	0	0	0
	FW	(Scotland) SCO	Billy McKeown	12	3	11	3	0	0	1	0
	FW	(Scotland) SCO	John McMillan	4	0	4	0	0	0	0	0
	FW	(Scotland) SCO	Jim McQuade	6	0	1	0	0	0	5	0
	FW	(Scotland) SCO	Alex Stewart	3	0	1	0	0	0	2	0
	FW	(Scotland) SCO	Tom Whalen	23	10	17	5	1	1	5	4

=== Transfers ===
Amongst those players joining and leaving the club were the following:

==== Players in ====
Player	From	Date
(Scotland) Alex Rollo	(Scotland) Kilmarnock	28 May 1956
(Scotland) Jim Hunter	(Scotland) Alloa Ath	11 Aug 1956
(Scotland) Felix Kiernan	(Scotland) Albion Rovers	22 Sep 1956
(Scotland) Bobby Gibson	(Scotland) Morton	29 Nov 1956
(Scotland) Bertie Auld	(Scotland) Celtic (loan)	

==== Players out ====
Player	To	Date
(Scotland) Gerry McCaffrey	(Scotland) Cowdenbeath	23 Jun 1956
(Scotland) Joe Harvey	(Scotland) Freed	30 Apr 1957
(Scotland) Jim Hunter	(Scotland) Freed	30 Apr 1957

== Reserve team ==
Dumbarton played a 'reserve' team in the Alliance League, which was set up for Division 2 sides. The season was split into two 'series' - with Dumbarton winning the First Series (with 6 wins and 2 draws from 10 games) and finishing as runners up in the Second (with 6 wins and 3 draws from 12 games).
