= McQuade =

McQuade is a surname of Irish origin, from the County Monaghan and other surrounding areas in Ulster. It originated as a variation of McCaul, and similar spellings include McQuaid and McQuaide. Notable people with the surname include:

== People ==
- Aidan McQuade, Northern Irish journalist and anti-slavery advocate
- Alex McQuade (born 1992), English footballer
- Andy McQuade, British director and writer
- Andy McQuade (footballer) (born 1959), Scottish footballer
- Arlene McQuade (1936–2014), American actress
- Arthur McQuade (1817–1884), Irish-Canadian politician from Ontario
- Barbara McQuade (born 1964), American attorney
- Betty McQuade (1941–2011), Australian singer
- Dan McQuade (1983–2026), American journalist
- Denis McQuade (born 1951), Scottish footballer
- Donald McQuade (1941–2025), English professor and author
- Francis Xavier McQuade (1911–1955), American judge
- Henry McQuade (1852–1893), Australian politician
- Jasmine McQuade (born 2003), British footballer
- Jim McQuade (1930–2020), Scottish footballer
- John McQuade (disambiguation), multiple people including:
  - John McQuade (1911–1984), Northern Irish politician and boxer
  - John McQuade (footballer) (born 1970), Scottish footballer
  - Johnny McQuade (American football) (1895–1980), American football player
- Kris McQuade (born 1952), Australian actress
- Marian McQuade (1917–2008), American activist
- Marjorie McQuade (1934–1997), Australian swimmer
- Martin McQuade (1894–1957), Australian rules footballer
- Molly McQuade, American poet and editor
- Paul McQuade (born 1987), Scottish footballer
- Pénélope McQuade (born 1970), Canadian radio and television host
- Peter McQuade (born 1948), Scottish footballer
- Richard B. McQuade Jr. (born 1940), American attorney and jurist
- Terry McQuade (born 1941), English footballer

== Characters ==
- J.J. McQuade, Texas Ranger, a character in Lone Wolf McQuade

== See also ==
- McCaul
- McQuaide
- McQuaid
- McQuade Home
- McQuade Park
