= Millet (disambiguation) =

Millet is a cereal grain.

Millet may also refer to:

== Places ==
- Millet, Alberta, Canada
- Millet, a fictional town close to Lake Wobegon
- Millet, an unincorporated community southwest of Lansing, MI
- Millet, Saint Lucia, a town in Anse la Raye Quarter

== Other uses ==
- Millet (surname)
- Millet (Ottoman Empire), an Ottoman religious community
- Millets, UK retailer of leisure goods owned by Blacks Outdoor Retail
- Millet (manufacturer), French maker of sporting goods
- Millet (TV channel), a pro-Russian television channel
- Millets, the former name of Blacks Outdoor Retail
- Xiaomi, literally translated to millet.

== See also ==
- Millett (disambiguation)
- Quaid-i-Millat (disambiguation)
- Millat FC, an Indian association football club
