= Maeve =

Maeve/Maiev
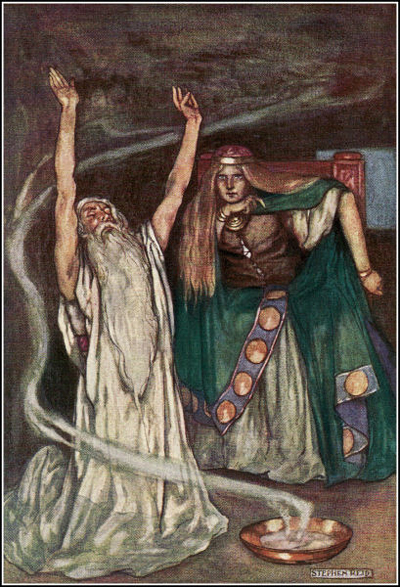
- Queen Maeve and the Druid, by illustrator Stephen Reid from the 1904 book The Boys' Cuchulainn by Eleanor Hull.
- Pronunciation: /meɪv/ mayv
- Gender: Female

Origin
- Origin: Irish
- Region of origin: Europe

Maeve, Meave, Maev or Maiv, Maiev (/meɪv/ mayv) is a female given name of Irish origin. It comes from the Irish name Méabh, which was spelt Meadhbh or Maedhbh in Early Modern Irish (pronounced [mʲɛɣβ]), Meḋḃ or Meaḋḃ in Middle Irish, and Medb in Old Irish (pronounced [mʲeðβ]). It may derive from a word meaning "she who intoxicates", "mead-woman", or alternatively "she who rules". Medb is a queen in Irish mythology who is thought to have originally been a sovereignty goddess.

== Usage ==
Maeve (in that spelling) was a Top 100 girls' name in Ireland for all but 12 of the 46 years between 1964 and 2009, and Meabh ranked 99th on the list of the most popular Irish girls' names of 2020. In Northern Ireland, Maeve was a Top 100 girls' name between 1997 and 2004, and Meabh ranked 44th in 2017. It ranked 218th on the list of most popular names for girls in England and Wales in 2020 and had risen in popularity to 94th position in 2020 in those countries. It has ranked among the top 100 names for girls since 2020 in Scotland, where it was the 72nd most popular name in 2021. It has also increased in usage in the Netherlands, where it was among the top 500 names for girls in 2014 and again between 2017 and 2021. It was the 44th most common name for newborn Dutch girls in 2021. Maeve has ranked among the 1,000 most popular names for girls born in the United States since 1997, among the top 500 names since 2013, and among the top 150 names since 2021.

== People with the given name ==
- Medb ingen Indrechtach (fl. 800), Princess of Connacht
- Maeve Binchy (1940–2012), Irish writer
- Maeve Brennan (1917–1993), Irish short story writer and journalist
- Maeve Dermody (born 1985), Australian actress
- Maeve Fort (1940–2008), British diplomat
- Maeve Gilmore (1917–1983), British artist and wife of Mervyn Peake
- Maeve Harris (born 1976), American abstract painter
- Maeve Higgins (born 1981), Irish comedian
- Maeve Hillery (née Finnegan), retired Irish doctor, the widow of Patrick Hillery, President of Ireland 1976–90
- Maeve Ingoldsby (1947–2021), Irish writer
- Maeve Jinkings (born 1976), Brazilian actress
- Maeve Kelly (1930–2025), Irish writer
- Maeve Kennedy McKean, American attorney and academic
- Maeve Kinkead (born 1946), American actress
- Maeve Kyle (1928–2025), Irish track athlete and field hockey player
- Meave Leakey (born 1942), British paleontologist
- Maeve McCarthy, Irish mathematician
- Maeve McGuire (born 1937), American actress
- Maeve Murphy, Irish screenwriter and film director
- Maeve O'Boyle (born 1987), Scottish singer-songwriter
- Maeve O'Connell, Irish politician
- Maeve O'Donovan (born 1990), Irish singer
- Maeve Quaid, Canadian academic
- Maeve Quinlan (born 1964), American actress and tennis player
- Maeve Sherlock (born 1960), British peer

== Mythological or fictional characters ==
- Medb, often anglicized as Maeve, Queen of Connacht in the Ulster Cycle of Irish mythology
- Maeve Benson, in the ABC Family drama Make It Or Break It, played by Alice Greczyn
- Maeve Donavan, in the American police drama Criminal Minds
- Maeve Harrigan, matriarch of the Harrigan crime family in the Paramount+ series MobLand, played by Helen Mirren
- Maeve Ludlow, fictional character from Doctors
- Maeve Millay, a main character in the TV series Westworld
- Maeve Ridordan, in Cate Tiernan's Sweep (book series)
- Maeve Ryan, in the American soap opera Ryan's Hope, played by Helen Gallagher
- Maeve Rojas, in Karen McManus's One of Us book series
- Maeve Stoddard, in the American soap opera Guiding Light
- Maeve Wiley, in the Netflix series Sex Education, played by Emma Mackey
- Maeve, a sorceress in the Canadian TV series The Adventures of Sinbad
- Maeve, a flanker class character in the popular video game Paladins: Champions of the Realm
- Maeve, a Fae Queen in the Throne of Glass series
- Maeve, The Winter Lady, the youngest of the Winter Queens, who is The Queen Who Is To Come in The Dresden Files series by Jim Butcher
- Queen Maeve, a superhero who is part of "The 7" on the comic book The Boys and its streaming adaptation
- Maebh, character in the 8th series, 10th episode of Doctor Who, "In the Forest of the Night"
- Queen Meve, Queen of Lyria and Rivia in The Witcher universe, who gave Geralt his title "of Rivia"
- Mebh Óg MacTíre, a main character in the animated film Wolfwalkers
