= Quaid =

Quaid may refer to:

- Qaid, an Arabic honorific title
- Quaid (surname), including a list of people with the name
- Qaid Joher Ezzuddin, Indian Islamic leader
- Quaid Road, a stretch of road in Queensland, Australia
- Quaid Software, a Canadian software company

== See also ==
- Qaidi (disambiguation)
- Quaid-i-Millat (disambiguation)
