= Miellet =

Miellet is a French surname. Notable people with the surname include:

- Alexis Miellet (born 1995), French middle-distance runner
- Edmond Miellet (1880–1953), French politician

== See also ==
- Millet (surname)
