= McQuaid =

McQuaid is a surname of Irish origin, from the County Monaghan and other surrounding areas in Ulster. It originated as a variation of McCaul, and similar spellings include McQuade and McQuaide. Notable people with the surname include:

- Adam McQuaid (born 1986), Canadian professional hockey player
- Ann McQuaid (born 1951), Irish canoer
- Bernard John McQuaid (1823–1909), American Roman Catholic bishop
- Brad McQuaid (1969–2019), American computer game designer
- Dan McQuaid (born 1960), American professional football player
- Glenn McQuaid (born 1972/1973), Irish film director
- Herb McQuaid (1899–1966), American baseball pitcher
- Jack McQuaid (1859–1895), American baseball player and umpire
- Jim McQuaid (1920–1991), Irish racing cyclist, coach, and manager
- John McQuaid, multiple people including
  - John McQuaid (cyclist) (born 1960), Irish cyclist
  - John A. McQuaid, Canadian jurist
  - John Charles McQuaid (1895–1973), Irish Roman Catholic archbishop
- Kieron McQuaid (born 1950), former Irish cyclist
- Mart McQuaid (1861–1928), professional baseball player
- Matt McQuaid (born 1996), American professional basketball player
- Melanie McQuaid (born 1973), Canadian triathlete
- Melvin McQuaid (1911–2001), Canadian politician
- Michelle McQuaid (born 1991), Canadian curler
- Oliver McQuaid (born 1954), Irish former cyclist
- Paddy McQuaid, Irish road racing cyclist
- Pat McQuaid (born 1949), Irish racing cyclist
- Paul McQuaid, Irish cyclist
- Peter McQuaid, Canadian politician
- Phyllis W. McQuaid (1928–2023), American politician
- Sarah McQuaid (born 1966), Spanish-born British singer, songwriter and guitarist
- Tommy McQuaid (1936–1981), Irish footballer
- Ululani McQuaid (1890–1970), Hawaiian opera singer and civic leader

== See also ==
- McCaul
- McQuaide
- McQuade
- McQuaid Jesuit High School, Rochester, New York, USA
- Quaid (surname)
