= David McCullough Bridge =

Bridge in Pittsburgh

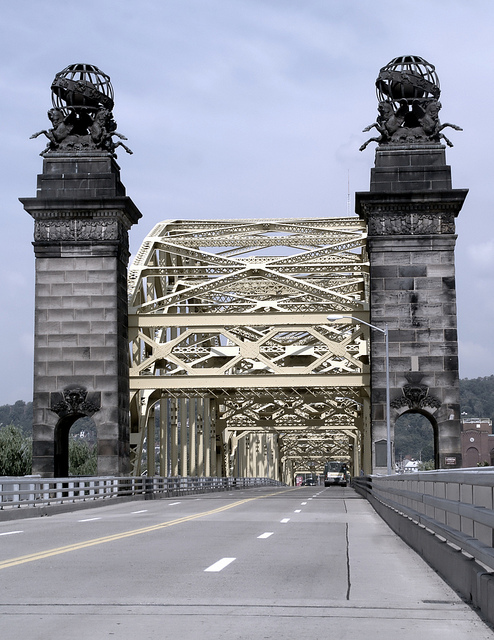
- Coordinates: 40°27′6″N 79°59′27″W
- Carries: 16th Street
- Crosses: Allegheny River
- Locale: Allegheny, Pennsylvania, United States
- Other name: Sixteenth Street Bridge
- Maintained by: Allegheny County
- NRHP #: 79002163

Characteristics
- Total length: 1,996 ft (608 m)
- Width: 41.3 ft (12.6 m)
- Longest span: 437 feet (133 m)
- Clearance below: 41.3 feet (12.6 m)

History
- Architect: Warren and Wetmore, architects
- Designer: H.G. Balcom, engineer
- Built: 1923
- David McCullough Bridge
- U.S. National Register of Historic Places
- Pittsburgh Landmark – PHLF
- NRHP reference No.: 79002163

Significant dates
- Added to NRHP: August 13, 1979
- Designated PHLF: 2001

Location
- Interactive map of David McCullough Bridge

The David McCullough Bridge, commonly and historically known as the 16th Street Bridge, is a steel trussed through arch bridge that spans the Allegheny River in Pittsburgh, Pennsylvania.

The 16th Street Bridge replaced the Mechanics Street Bridge, completed at the behest of the State of Pennsylvania in 1838. The 16th Street Bridge was constructed in 1922 with a length of 1,900 feet (580 m) and a width of 40 feet (12 m). The bridge was listed on the National Register of Historic Places in 1979. The 16th Street Bridge connects the Strip District with the North Shore near Deutschtown.

Days after the disastrous St. Patrick's Day Flood of 1936, reports spread on March 20 that the bridge had collapsed from the pressure of the receding flood waters and debris, prompting Pittsburgh Police Chief Jacob Dorsey to close all city bridges for fear of receding waters and debris weakening or collapsing them. However, the reports were soon discovered to be false.

On July 7, 2013, the structure was named in honor of historian, author, and commentator David McCullough, a Pittsburgh native, in a bridge ceremony sponsored by Heinz History Center.

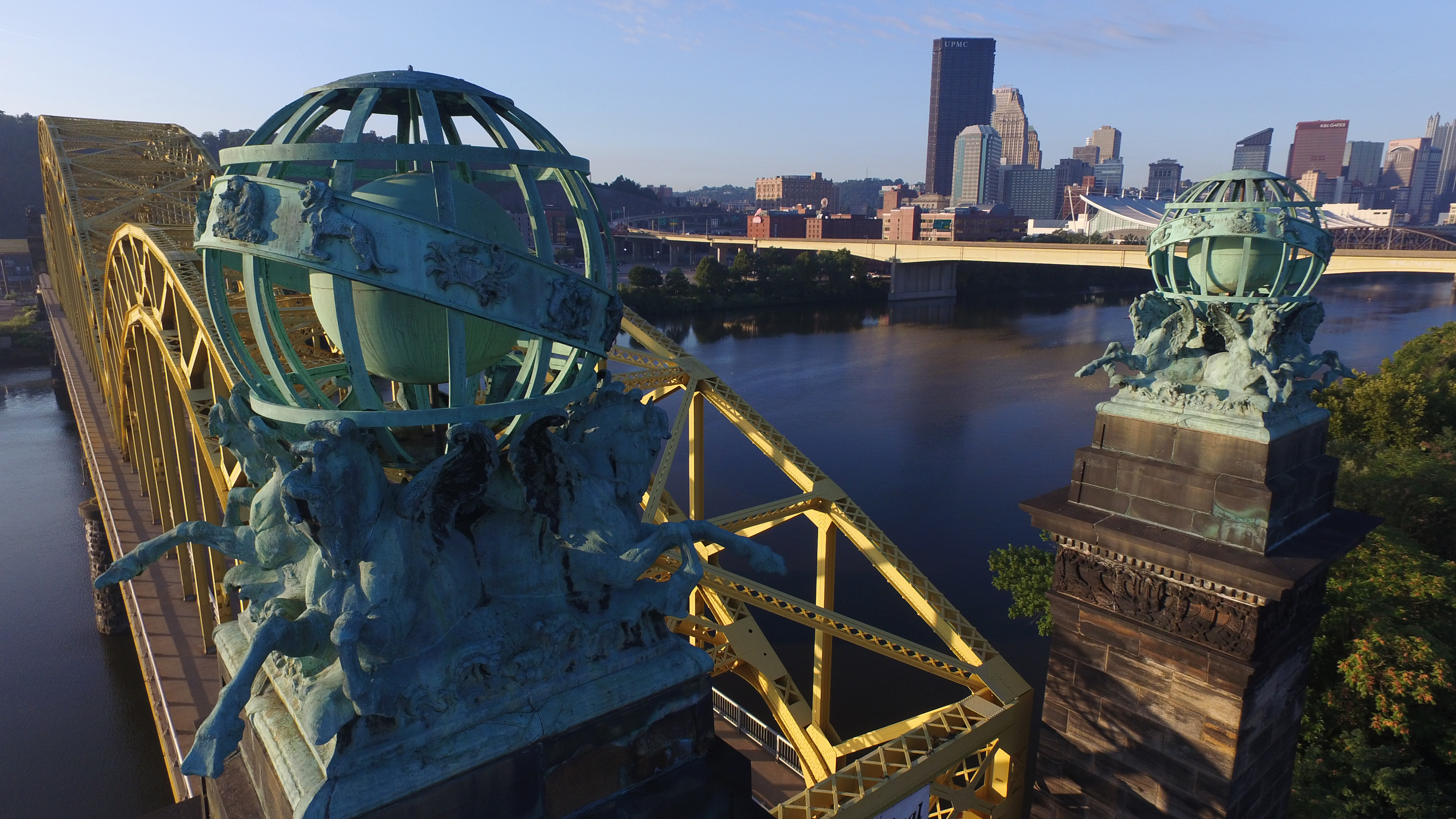
View from above

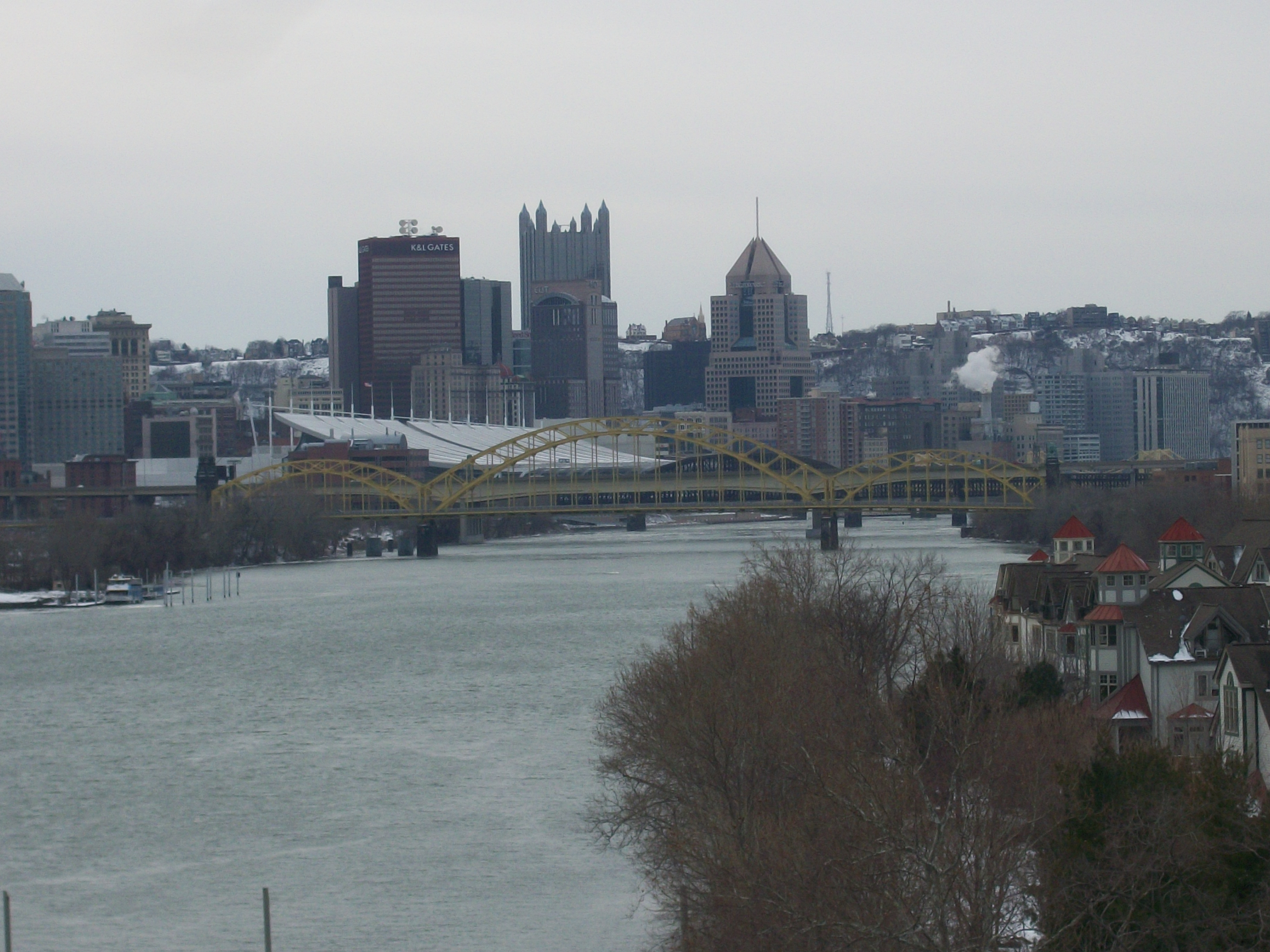
View from 31st Street Bridge with downtown in the background and Heinz Loft on the north bank

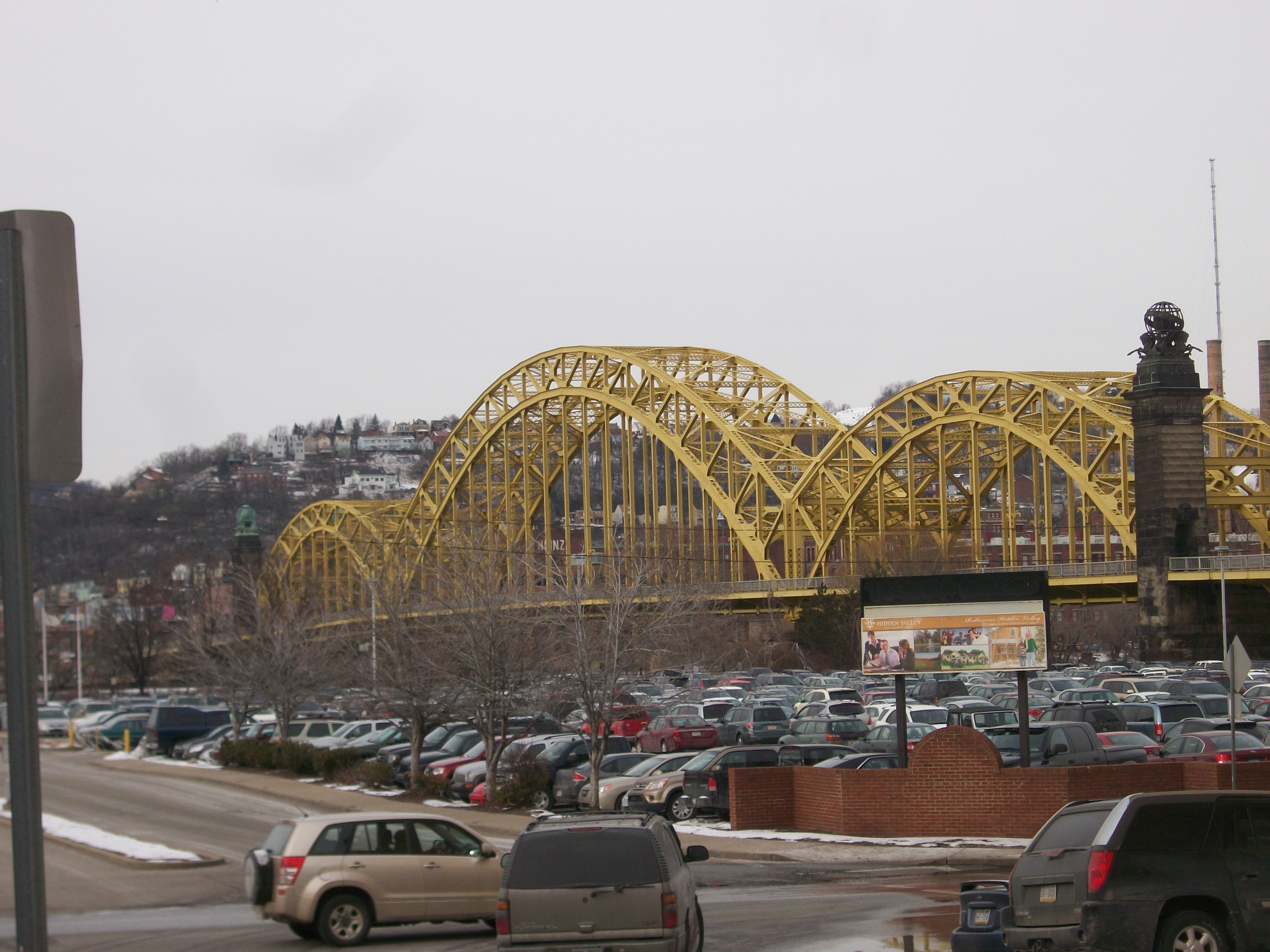
View from Strip District

== See also ==
- List of crossings of the Allegheny River
- National Register of Historic Places listings in Pittsburgh, Pennsylvania
