= Aillet =

Aillet is a surname. Notable people with the surname include:

- Joe Aillet (1904–1971), American football and basketball coach and college athletics administrator
- Marc Aillet (born 1957), French Roman Catholic bishop

== See also ==
- Millet (surname)
