= McQuaig =

McQuaig is a surname. Notable people with the surname include:

- Jerry McQuaig (1912–2001), American baseball player
- Linda McQuaig (born 1951), Canadian writer and journalist
- Scott McQuaig (born 1960), American country singer-songwriter

== See also ==
- McQuaid
