= Des McLean =

Des McLean may refer to:

- Des McLean (comedian), Scottish stand-up comedian, actor and presenter
- Des McLean (footballer) (1931–2008), Scottish footballer
