= Harvey Scott =

Harvey Scott may refer to:

- Harvey D. Scott (1818–1891), U.S. Representative from Indiana
- Harvey W. Scott (1838–1910), newspaper editor from Oregon
- Harvey J. Scott, former Pittsburgh Police Chief, 1939–1952
