= Kaithi (disambiguation) =

Kaithi is a historical script used widely in parts of North India.

Kaithi may also refer to:

- Kaithi (Unicode block), a Unicode block for the script
- Kaithi (1951 film), a black-and-white Indian Tamil-language thriller film by S. Balachander
- Kaithi (2019 film), an Indian Tamil-language action thriller film by Lokesh Kanagaraj, part of the Lokesh Cinematic Universe

== See also ==
- Khaidi (disambiguation)
- Qaidi (disambiguation)
- Lokesh Cinematic Universe, Indian film franchise by Lokesh Kanagaraj originating from the 2019 film
