= McQuaide =

McQuaide is a surname of Irish origin, from the County Monaghan and other surrounding areas in Ulster. It originated as a variation of McCaul, and similar spellings include McQuade and McQuaid. Notable people with the surname include:

- Franklin McQuaide (1887–1954), American police chief
- Jake McQuaide (born 1987), American football player

== See also ==
- McCaul
- McQuade
- McQuaid
- Camp McQuaide, former United States Army camp in California
