= Qaidi =

Qaidi may refer to:

- Qaidi, Iran, a village in Jam Rural District, Bushehr Province, Iran
- Qaidi (1940 film), an Indian Hindi-language film by S.F. Hasnain
- Qaidi (1957 film), an Indian Hindi-language drama film by Mohammed Hussain, starring Suresh, Padmini, Ragini and Johnny Walker
- Qaidi (1962 film), a Pakistani film
- Qaidi (1984 film), an Indian Hindi-language action film by S.S. Ravichandra, starring Jeetendra and Shatrughan Sinha
- Qaidi (1986 film), a Pakistani Punjabi-language film
- Kaatru Veliyidai, a 2017 Indian Tamil-language film by Mani Ratnam, Hindi title Qaidi: The Jail Break

== See also ==
- Khaidi (disambiguation)
- Kaithi (disambiguation)
- Quaid (disambiguation)
- Qaid (film), a 1975 Indian film
