= John McQuaid =

John McQuaid is the name of:

- John McQuaid (college president), past president of Saint Peter's College, New Jersey
- John McQuaid (cyclist), a bicyclist who competed in the Men's Individual Road Race at the 1988 Summer Olympics
- John A. McQuaid, a justice of the Supreme Court of Prince Edward Island
- John Charles McQuaid (1895–1973), Archbishop of Dublin (1940–1972)

== See also ==
- John McQuade (disambiguation)
