= Khaidi =

Khaidi (lit. 'prisoner') may refer to the following Indian films:

- Khaidi Kannaiah, a 1962 Telugu-language film
- Khaidi Babai, a 1974 Telugu-language film
- Khaidi (1983 film), a 1983 Telugu-language film
  - Khaidi No. 786, a 1988 Telugu-language film, sequel to the 1983 film
  - Khaidi No. 150, a 2017 Telugu-language film, sequel to the 1988 film
- Khaidi (1984 film), a 1984 Kannada-language film
- Khaidi Rudraiah, a 1986 Telugu-language film

== See also ==
- Qaidi (disambiguation)
- Kaithi (disambiguation)
