= Quaid (surname) =

Quaid is a surname. Notable people with this surname include:

- Charles Quaid (1908–1984), New Zealand rugby union player
- Dennis Quaid (born 1954), American actor
- Evi Quaid (born 1963), American film director
- Jack Quaid (born 1992), American actor
- Joe Quaid (born 1972), Irish hurler
- Maeve Quaid, Canadian academic
- Nickie Quaid (born 1989), Irish hurler
- Randy Quaid (born 1950), American actor
- Seamus Quaid (1937–1980), Irish police officer
- Tommy Quaid (1957–1998), Irish hurler

== Fictional characters ==
- Douglas Quaid, main character in the films Total Recall (1990) and Total Recall (2012)

== See also ==
- McQuaid
