= Millett =

Millett may refer to:

== People ==
- Adia Millett, American artist
- Anthea Millett (born 1941), British public servant
- Arthur Millett (1874–1952), American actor
- Charisse Millett (born 1964), American politician
- Frederick Millett (1928–1990), English cricketeer
- John D. Millett (1912–1993), president of Miami University in Ohio
- Kate Millett (1934–2017), American feminist writer and activist
- Larry Millett (born 1947), American journalist and author
- Lewis L. Millett (1920–2009), US Army officer
- Martin Millett (born 1955), British archaeologist
- Michael Millett (1977–1995), English footballer
- Patricia Ann Millett (born 1963), U.S. Court of Appeals for the District of Columbia Circuit Judge
- Paul Millett (born 1954), British historian at Cambridge University
- Peter Millett, Baron Millett (1932–2021), British judge
- Peter Millett (diplomat) (born 1955), British ambassador to Libya
- Terron Millett (born 1968), American boxer

== Places ==
- Millett, Michigan
- Millett, Nevada
- Millett Hall, Oxford, Ohio
- Millett Opera House, Austin, Texas

== See also ==
- Millet (disambiguation)
