= Barbara Oliver Hagerman =

Canadian politician (1943–2016)

The Honourable Barbara Oliver Hagerman OPEI BA
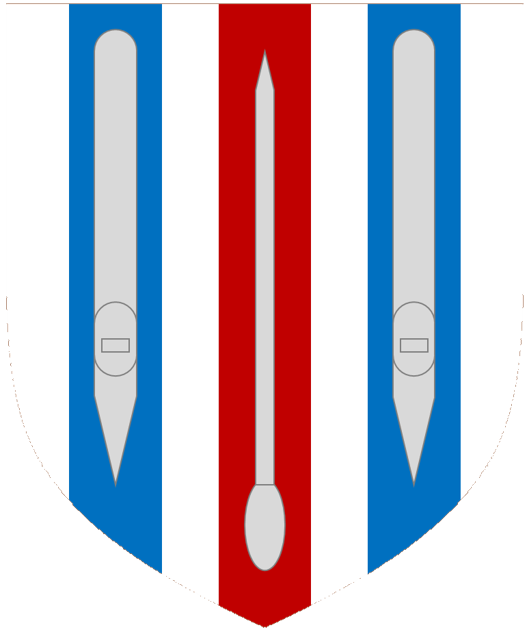

27th Lieutenant Governor of Prince Edward Island
- In office July 31, 2006 – August 15, 2011
- Monarch: Elizabeth II
- Governors General: Michaëlle Jean; David Johnston
- Premier: Pat Binns; Robert Ghiz
- Preceded by: Léonce Bernard
- Succeeded by: H. Frank Lewis

Personal details
- Born: Barbara Ann Oliver; February 9, 1943 Hartland, New Brunswick
- Died: October 6, 2016 (aged 73) Charlottetown, Prince Edward Island
- Spouse: Nelson Hagerman
- Education: Mount Allison University
- Profession: Choral performer, music teacher

Barbara Anne Hagerman, OPEI (née Oliver; February 9, 1943 – October 6, 2016) was a Canadian music teacher and performer and was the 27th Lieutenant Governor of Prince Edward Island. She was the second woman in the province's history to have held this position.

== Life ==
Born in Hartland, New Brunswick in 1943, siblings Donald Oliver and Susan Mazerolle (née Oliver).

She earned a degree from Mount Allison University specializing in voice and organ, and began her career in music in Charlottetown and Summerside, Charlottetown being her current place of residence. She had a notable performance career on the island as a vocal soloist with the P.E.I. Symphony Orchestra. For seventeen years she was the conductor of the Summerside Community Choir which performed throughout the Maritimes and at Carnegie Hall under her leadership.

== Family ==
She was married to Nelson Hagerman, and together they had two children, Kurt Hagerman (Rupal), Brynne Trites (Matthew) and three grandchildren, Asha Hagerman, Kyle Hagerman and Abigail Trites. Her husband was also the chief organizer for Belinda Stronach in the 2003 Conservative Party leadership race. Prior to her appointment, she did not have any experience in law or politics.

== Career ==
Her appointment to represent Queen Elizabeth II on Prince Edward Island as Lieutenant-Governor was confirmed by the office of Canadian Prime Minister Stephen Harper on July 12, 2006. Hagerman was installed as Lieutenant-Governor on July 31, 2006. Her duties as Lieutenant Governor were briefly performed by John A. McQuaid from March 12–13, 2008 as the Administrator of Prince Edward Island).

Before her appointment there was some controversy that it was nothing more than a patronage appointment by Prime Minister Stephen Harper. Barbara Hagerman's husband, Nelson Hagerman was the "treasurer of the P.E.I. Chapter of the Conservative Party of Canada, president of the Winsloe-West Royalty Progressive Conservative Association, and the financial agent for the PC party in the province."

== Death ==
She died at the age of 73 from cancer on October 6, 2016.

== Arms ==
Coat of arms of Barbara Oliver Hagerman

Crest
A Salt Bank schooner proper its hull Azure flying a streamer paly Gules and Argent;
Escutcheon
Argent on a pallet Gules between two pallets Azure each charged with an organ pipe, a conductor’s baton Argent;
Supporters
Two great blue herons each holding in its beak a lady’s slipper flower proper and issuant from barry wavy Argent and Azure;
Motto
IN CONSONANTIA (In Harmony)
