= Harvey J. Scott =

- Police career
- Department: Pittsburgh Police
- Service years: ?-August 11, 1952 (Pittsburgh Police)
- Rank: – Chief; 1939– August 11, 1952

Harvey J. Scott was a longtime Pittsburgh Police leader, who served as Pittsburgh Police Chief from Spring 1939 to August 11, 1952.

== See also ==
- Police chief
- Allegheny County Sheriff
- List of law enforcement agencies in Pennsylvania

Legal offices
Preceded by Franklin McQuaide	Pittsburgh Police Chief; 1939–1952	Succeeded by Henry Pieper
