= Martin McQuade =

Australian rules footballer

Personal information
- Full name: Michael Stanislaus McQuade
- Born: 19 October 1894; Dandenong, Victoria
- Died: 6 February 1957 (aged 62); Dandenong, Victoria
- Original team: Xavier
- Height: 170 cm (5 ft 7 in)
- Weight: 62.5 kg (138 lb)

Playing career^{1}
Years	Club	Games (Goals)
1915	Melbourne	2 (1)
- ^{1} Playing statistics correct to the end of 1915.

Martin Stanislaus McQuade (19 October 1894 – 6 February 1957) was an Australian rules footballer who played with Melbourne in the Victorian Football League (VFL).
