= Millet (TV channel) =

Crimean TV channel

- Headquarters: Simferopol

Programming
- Languages: Crimean Tatar, Russian

History
- Launched: 1 September 2015; 10 years ago

Links
- Website: trkmillet.ru

Millet is a pro-Russian Crimean Tatar TV channel that has been broadcasting in Crimea since September 1, 2015. On April 1, 2016, it began satellite broadcasting via the Yamal-401 satellite and covers the entire territory of Russia, Ukraine, Turkey and the countries of Central Asia. It is based in Simferopol. The share of the Crimean Tatar language is 70%.

== History ==
Previously, Crimean Tatar TV channel ATR and radio station Meydan worked on the peninsula, which were deprived of their license by the new administration after the annexation of Crimea by Russia. On August 10, 2015, Roskomnadzor registered the Millet TV channel and the radio station Vatan Sedasy.
