= Willie Box =

Scottish footballer (1927–2013)

William Box
Personal information
- Full name: William Gray Box
- Date of birth: 25 December 1927
- Place of birth: Govan, Scotland
- Date of death: 2013 (aged 85)
- Place of death: Stirling, Scotland
- Position: Wing half

Senior career*
Years	Team	Apps	(Gls)
- Rutherglen Glencairn
1951–1955	Arbroath	97	(4)
1955–1956	Dumbarton	2	(0)
- * Club domestic league appearances and goals

William Gray Box (25 December 1927 – 2013) was a Scottish footballer who played for Arbroath and Dumbarton.

Box died in Stirling in 2013, at the age of 85.
