= Jimmy McDonald (footballer, born 1932) =

Scottish footballer (1932–2024)

Personal information
- Full name: James McDonald
- Date of birth: 18 April 1932
- Place of birth: Greenock, Scotland
- Date of death: 10 February 2024 (aged 91)
- Position: Outside right

Youth career
- Gourock

Senior career*
Years	Team	Apps	(Gls)
1954–1956	Dumbarton	15	(5)
1956–1957	Gillingham	1	(0)
1957–1959	Morton	21	(3)
- * Club domestic league appearances and goals

James McDonald (18 April 1932 – 10 February 2024) was a Scottish footballer who played as an outside right. After playing junior football with Gourock, he joined Dumbarton and after two seasons moved south of the border to Gillingham. He returned north the following season to join Morton. McDonald died on 10 February 2024, at the age of 91.
