= Franklin McQuaide =

American police officer

Franklin T. McQuaide
- Born: September 2, 1887; Limerick section of Pittsburgh, PA
- Died: June 21, 1954 (aged 66)
- Police career
- Department: Pittsburgh Police
- Service years: 1907 -1944 (Pittsburgh Police)
- Rank: Chief; 1933-1934; 1936-1939
- Other work: Head of Homicide; 1939-1944

Franklin T. McQuaide (September 2, 1887 – June 21, 1954) was a longtime Pittsburgh Police leader.

== Early life ==
McQuaide's father was Thomas A. McQuaide, who served as superintendent of Pittsburgh Police from 1904 until 1914.

== Career ==
He served as Pittsburgh Police Chief from 1933 until 1934 and again from Summer 1936-Spring 1939. He was then the head of the homicide division from 1939 until his retirement in 1944 when he became the Chief of Police at Kennywood, an amusement park in neighboring West Mifflin, Pennsylvania.

Before becoming chief, McQuaide joined the force as a detective in 1907. He also worked as the head of security at the William Penn Hotel and ran the McQuaide Detective Agency, founded by his father, Thomas A. McQuaide, from 1928 until he was chosen as Pittsburgh Police Chief in 1933.

== Personal life ==
McQuaide lived with his wife, Eleanor Joyce McQuaide, and their nine children in the Mount Washington (Pittsburgh) neighborhood of Pittsburgh.

Their son, Thomas A. McQuaide, served with the Pittsburgh Police and the FBI.

Legal offices
Preceded by Peter P. Walsh; Jacob Dorsey	Pittsburgh Police Chief; 1933-1934; 1936-1939	Succeeded by Ben R. Marshall; Harvey J. Scott
