= 1955–56 Scottish Football League =

Scottish football season

Statistics of the Scottish Football League in season 1955–56.

== Scottish League Division One ==
Pos	Team	Pld	W	D	L	GF	GA	GR	Pts
1	Rangers	34	22	8	4	85	27	3.148	52
2	Aberdeen	34	18	10	6	87	50	1.740	46
3	Heart of Midlothian	34	19	7	8	99	47	2.106	45
4	Hibernian	34	19	7	8	86	50	1.720	45
5	Celtic	34	16	9	9	55	39	1.410	41
6	Queen of the South	34	16	5	13	69	73	0.945	37
7	Airdrieonians	34	14	8	12	85	96	0.885	36
8	Kilmarnock	34	12	10	12	52	45	1.156	34
9	Partick Thistle	34	13	7	14	62	60	1.033	33
10	Motherwell	34	11	11	12	53	59	0.898	33
11	Raith Rovers	34	12	9	13	58	75	0.773	33
12	East Fife	34	13	5	16	61	69	0.884	31
13	Dundee	34	12	6	16	56	65	0.862	30
14	Falkirk	34	11	6	17	58	75	0.773	28
15	St Mirren	34	10	7	17	57	70	0.814	27
16	Dunfermline Athletic	34	10	6	18	42	82	0.512	26
17	Clyde	34	8	6	20	50	74	0.676	22
18	Stirling Albion	34	4	5	25	23	82	0.280	13

Source: RSSSF

== Scottish League Division Two ==
Pos	Team	Pld	W	D	L	GF	GA	GD	Pts	Promotion or relegation
1	Queen's Park	36	23	8	5	78	28	+50	54	Promotion to the 1956–57 Division One
2	Ayr United	36	24	3	9	103	55	+48	51	Promotion to the 1956–57 Division One
3	St Johnstone	36	21	7	8	86	45	+41	49	
4	Dumbarton	36	21	5	10	83	62	+21	47	
5	Stenhousemuir	36	20	4	12	82	54	+28	44	
6	Brechin City	36	18	6	12	60	56	+4	42	
7	Cowdenbeath	36	16	7	13	80	85	−5	39	
8	Dundee United	36	12	14	10	78	65	+13	38	
9	Morton	36	15	6	15	71	69	+2	36	
10	Third Lanark	36	16	3	17	80	64	+16	35	
11	Hamilton Academical	36	13	7	16	86	84	+2	33	
12	Stranraer	36	14	5	17	77	92	−15	33	
13	Alloa Athletic	36	12	7	17	67	73	−6	31	
14	Berwick Rangers	36	11	9	16	52	77	−25	31	
15	Forfar Athletic	36	10	9	17	62	75	−13	29	
16	East Stirlingshire	36	9	10	17	66	94	−28	28	
17	Albion Rovers	36	8	11	17	58	82	−24	27	
18	Arbroath	36	10	6	20	47	67	−20	26	
19	Montrose	36	4	3	29	44	133	−89	11	

Source: "1955-1956 Second Division - SPFL Archive". SPFL.
