= Jacob Dorsey =

- Police career
- Department: Pittsburgh Police
- Service years: ?–1936 (Pittsburgh Police)
- Rank: – Chief 1934-1936

Jacob Dorsey was a longtime Pittsburgh Police leader, who served as Pittsburgh Police Chief from September 1934 until the Summer of 1936.

Dorsey accused former chief Marshall of racism and corruption in 1934.

== See also ==
- Police chief
- Allegheny County Sheriff
- List of law enforcement agencies in Pennsylvania

Legal offices
Preceded by Ben Marshall	Pittsburgh Police Chief; 1934–1936	Succeeded by Franklin McQuaide
