= Sam Bryceland =

Scottish footballer (1932–2006)

Personal information
- Full name: Samuel Harrington Bryceland
- Date of birth: 14 July 1932
- Place of birth: Inverclyde, Scotland
- Date of death: 2006 (aged 74)
- Place of death: Inverclyde, Scotland
- Position: Inside right

Youth career
- Gourock

Senior career*
Years	Team	Apps	(Gls)
1954–1956	Morton	29	(8)
1955–1956	Dumbarton	4	(2)
1956–1957	Gloucester City		
1957–1958	Worcester City		
- * Club domestic league appearances and goals

Samuel Harrington Bryceland (14 July 1932 – 2006) was a Scottish footballer who played for Morton, Dumbarton, Gloucester City and Worcester City. Bryceland died in Inverclyde in 2006, aged 74.
