= Molly McQuade =

American poet, critic, and editor

Molly McQuade is an American poet, critic, and editor. Her work has appeared in The Michigan Quarterly Review, The Baffler, The New Criterion, The Boston Review, Poetry, The Paris Review, and Dædalus.

McQuade has published a poetry collection, Barbarism (2002), as well as a book of nonfiction on poetry, Stealing Glimpses: Of Poetry, Poets, and Things In Between (1999). She is the editor of several anthologies, including One Word: Contemporary Writers on the Words They Love or Loathe (2010), which received a starred review in Publishers Weekly. She was a James Merrill House Fellow in Stonington, CT (2001).

== Books ==
- ed. An Unsentimental Education: Writers and Chicago, University of Chicago Press, 1995
- Stealing Glimpses: Of Poetry, Poets, and Things In Between / Essays, Sarabande Books, 1999
- ed. By Herself: Women Reclaim Poetry, Graywolf Press, 2000
- Barbarism, Four Way Books, 2002
- ed. The Long Meanwhile: Stories of Arrival and Departure, Weighed Words LLC, 2007
- ed. One Word: Contemporary Writers on the Words They Love or Loathe, Sarabande Books, 2010
