= Medb ingen Indrechtach =

Medb ingen Indrechtach (Possibly Maeve), Queen of Ailech, 8th century.
