= 1956–57 Scottish Football League =

Scottish football season

Statistics of the Scottish Football League in season 1956–57.

== Scottish League Division One ==
Pos	Team	Pld	W	D	L	GF	GA	GR	Pts
1	Rangers	34	26	3	5	96	48	2.000	55
2	Heart of Midlothian	34	24	5	5	81	48	1.688	53
3	Kilmarnock	34	16	10	8	57	39	1.462	42
4	Raith Rovers	34	16	7	11	84	58	1.448	39
5	Celtic	34	15	8	11	58	43	1.349	38
6	Aberdeen	34	18	2	14	79	59	1.339	38
7	Motherwell	34	16	5	13	72	66	1.091	37
8	Partick Thistle	34	13	8	13	53	51	1.039	34
9	Hibernian	34	12	9	13	69	56	1.232	33
10	Dundee	34	13	6	15	55	61	0.902	32
11	Airdrieonians	34	13	4	17	77	89	0.865	30
12	St Mirren	34	12	6	16	58	72	0.806	30
13	Queen's Park	34	11	7	16	55	59	0.932	29
14	Falkirk	34	10	8	16	51	70	0.729	28
15	East Fife	34	10	6	18	59	82	0.720	26
16	Queen of the South	34	10	5	19	54	96	0.563	25
17	Dunfermline Athletic	34	9	6	19	54	74	0.730	24
18	Ayr United	34	7	5	22	48	89	0.539	19

Source: RSSSF

== Scottish League Division Two ==
Pos	Team	Pld	W	D	L	GF	GA	GD	Pts	Promotion or relegation
1	Clyde	36	29	6	1	122	39	+83	64	Promotion to the 1957–58 First Division
2	Third Lanark	36	24	3	9	105	51	+54	51	Promotion to the 1957–58 First Division
3	Cowdenbeath	36	20	5	11	87	65	+22	45	
4	Morton	36	18	7	11	81	70	+11	43	
5	Albion Rovers	36	18	6	12	98	80	+18	42	
6	Brechin City	36	15	10	11	72	68	+4	40	
7	Stranraer	36	15	10	11	79	77	+2	40	
8	Stirling Albion	36	17	5	14	81	64	+17	39	
9	Dumbarton	36	17	4	15	101	70	+31	38	
10	Arbroath	36	17	4	15	79	57	+22	38	
11	Hamilton Academical	36	14	8	14	69	68	+1	36	
12	St Johnstone	36	14	6	16	79	80	−1	34	
13	Dundee United	36	14	6	16	75	80	−5	34	
14	Stenhousemuir	36	13	6	17	71	81	−10	32	
15	Alloa Athletic	36	11	5	20	66	99	−33	27	
16	Forfar Athletic	36	9	5	22	75	100	−25	23	
17	Montrose	36	7	7	22	54	124	−70	21	
18	Berwick Rangers	36	7	6	23	58	114	−56	20	
19	East Stirlingshire	36	5	7	24	56	121	−65	17	

Source: "1956-1957 Second Division - SPFL Archive". SPFL.

== See also ==
- 1956–57 in Scottish football
