= Millett, Nevada =

Ghost town in Nye County, Nevada, US

Coordinates: 39°00′55″N 117°10′51″W

Millett is an extinct town in Nye County, in the U.S. state of Nevada. The GNIS classifies it as a populated place.

== History ==
A post office was established at Millett in 1906, and remained in operation until 1930. In 1941, the population was 25. A variant name was "Millet". The community has the name of F. B. Millet.
