= John McQuade (disambiguation) =

John McQuade (1912–1984) was a British soldier and Northern Irish politician.

John McQuade may also refer to:

- John McQuade (footballer) (born 1970), Scottish footballer
- Johnny McQuade (American football) (1895–1980), American football player

== See also ==
- John McQuaid (disambiguation)
- John Quade (1938–2009), American actor
