= Kaithi (Unicode block) =

- Range: U+11080..U+110CF (80 code points)
- Plane: SMP
- Scripts: Kaithi
- Major alphabets: Bhojpuri; Magahi; Awadhi; Maithili; Urdu; Hindi
- Assigned: 68 code points
- Unused: 12 reserved code points

Unicode version history
- 5.2 (2009): 66 (+66)
- 11.0 (2018): 67 (+1)
- 14.0 (2021): 68 (+1)

Unicode documentation
- Code chart ∣ Web page

Kaithi is a Unicode block containing characters historically used for writing Bhojpuri, Bajjika, Magahi, Awadhi, Maithili, Urdu, Hindi, and other related languages of the Bihar/Uttar Pradesh area of northern India.

Kaithi^{[1]}^{[2]} Official Unicode Consortium code chart (PDF)
	0	1	2	3	4	5	6	7	8	9	A	B	C	D	E	F
U+1108x	𑂀	𑂁	𑂂	𑂃	𑂄	𑂅	𑂆	𑂇	𑂈	𑂉	𑂊	𑂋	𑂌	𑂍	𑂎	𑂏
U+1109x	𑂐	𑂑	𑂒	𑂓	𑂔	𑂕	𑂖	𑂗	𑂘	𑂙	𑂚	𑂛	𑂜	𑂝	𑂞	𑂟
U+110Ax	𑂠	𑂡	𑂢	𑂣	𑂤	𑂥	𑂦	𑂧	𑂨	𑂩	𑂪	𑂫	𑂬	𑂭	𑂮	𑂯
U+110Bx	𑂰	𑂱	𑂲	𑂳	𑂴	𑂵	𑂶	𑂷	𑂸	𑂹	𑂺	𑂻	𑂼	𑂽	𑂾	𑂿
U+110Cx	𑃀	𑃁	𑃂											𑃍		
Notes: 1. As of Unicode version 16.0; 2. Grey areas indicate non-assigned code points

== History ==
The following Unicode-related documents record the purpose and process of defining specific characters in the Kaithi block:

Version	Final code points (Note: Proposed code points and characters names may differ from final code points and names)	Count	L2 ID	WG2 ID	Document
5.2	U+11080..110C1	66	L2/05-343		Pandey, Anshuman (2005-10-25), Proposal to Encode the Kaithi Script in Plane 1 of ISO/IEC 10646
5.2	U+11080..110C1	66	L2/05-368	N3014	Everson, Michael (2005-11-06), Towards an encoding of the Kaithi script
5.2	U+11080..110C1	66	L2/07-199		Pandey, Anshuman (2007-05-21), Proposal to Encode the Kaithi Script in Plane 1
5.2	U+11080..110C1	66	L2/07-418	N3389	Pandey, Anshuman (2007-12-13), Proposal to Encode the Kaithi Script in ISO/IEC 10646
5.2	U+11080..110C1	66	L2/08-003		Moore, Lisa (2008-02-14), "Kaithi", UTC #114 Minutes
5.2	U+11080..110C1	66	L2/08-156	N3438	Anderson, Deborah; Pandey, Anshuman (2008-04-11), Request for removal of digits from Kaithi proposal
5.2	U+11080..110C1	66	L2/08-194		Pandey, Anshuman (2008-05-06), Proposal to Encode the Kaithi Script in ISO/IEC 10646
5.2	U+11080..110C1	66	L2/08-318	N3453 (pdf, doc)	Umamaheswaran, V. S. (2008-08-13), "M52.15", Unconfirmed minutes of WG 2 meeting 52
5.2	U+11080..110C1	66	L2/08-370	N3544	Anderson, Deborah (2008-10-15), Proposal to add three Kaithi punctuation marks
5.2	U+11080..110C1	66	L2/08-400		Anderson, Deborah (2008-10-29), Information on U+110BD KAITHI NUMBER SIGN
5.2	U+11080..110C1	66	L2/08-161R2		Moore, Lisa (2008-11-05), "Consensus 115-C18", UTC #115 Minutes, "Rescind approval of 10 characters for Kaithi digits, at U+110C0..U+110C9. They will be unified with Devanagari."
5.2	U+11080..110C1	66	L2/08-412	N3553 (pdf, doc)	Umamaheswaran, V. S. (2008-11-05), "M53.06", Unconfirmed minutes of WG 2 meeting 53
5.2	U+11080..110C1	66	L2/08-361		Moore, Lisa (2008-12-02), "Consensus 117-C22", UTC #117 Minutes
5.2	U+11080..110C1	66	L2/09-070		Pandey, Anshuman; Anderson, Deborah (2009-02-01), Comments on Kaithi Punctuation Marks and FPDAM 6
5.2	U+11080..110C1	66	L2/09-071	N3520R	Anderson, Deborah (2009-02-02), Details on Kaithi punctuation (based on N3389)
5.2	U+11080..110C1	66	L2/09-089	N3574	Pandey, Anshuman (2009-02-10), Proposal to Encode Section Marks for Kaithi in ISO/IEC 10646
5.2	U+11080..110C1	66	L2/09-003R		Moore, Lisa (2009-02-12), "E.6", UTC #118 / L2 #215 Minutes
5.2	U+11080..110C1	66	L2/09-234	N3603 (pdf, doc)	Umamaheswaran, V. S. (2009-07-08), "M54.03c", Unconfirmed minutes of WG 2 meeting 54
5.2	U+11080..110C1	66	L2/09-270R		Anderson, Deborah (2009-08-05), Kaithi Decomposition Questions for Unicode 5.2
5.2	U+11080..110C1	66	L2/09-225R		Moore, Lisa (2009-08-17), "E.3.1", UTC #120 / L2 #217 Minutes
11.0	U+110CD	1	L2/16-097R		Yang, Benjamin (2016-04-29), Proposal to encode Kaithi Number Sign Above
11.0	U+110CD	1	L2/16-156		Anderson, Deborah; Whistler, Ken; Pournader, Roozbeh; Glass, Andrew; Iancu, Laurențiu (2016-05-06), "10. Kaithi", Recommendations to UTC #147 May 2016 on Script Proposals
11.0	U+110CD	1	L2/16-121		Moore, Lisa (2016-05-20), "D.13", UTC #147 Minutes
14.0	U+110C2	1	L2/20-151		A, Srinidhi; A, Sridatta (2020-06-24), Proposal to encode the KAITHI VOWEL SIGN VOCALIC R
14.0	U+110C2	1	L2/20-169		Anderson, Deborah; Whistler, Ken; Pournader, Roozbeh; Moore, Lisa; Constable, Peter; Liang, Hai (2020-07-21), "12. Kaithi", Recommendations to UTC #164 July 2020 on Script Proposals
14.0	U+110C2	1	L2/20-172		Moore, Lisa (2020-08-03), "Consensus 164-C14", UTC #164 Minutes
