= Felix Kiernan =

Scottish footballer (1929–2004)

Personal information
- Date of birth: 18 April 1929
- Date of death: 2004 (aged 75)
- Place of death: Coatbridge, Scotland
- Position: Inside forward

Youth career
- Armadale Thistle

Senior career*
Years	Team	Apps	(Gls)
1953–1957	Albion Rovers	89	(40)
1956–1958	Dumbarton	11	(8)
1957–1958	Stenhousemuir	5	(1)
1958–1959	Albion Rovers	21	(1)
- * Club domestic league appearances and goals

Felix Kiernan (18 April 1929 – 2004) was a Scottish footballer who played for Albion Rovers, Dumbarton and Stenhousemuir.

Kiernan died in Coatbridge in 2004, at the age of 75.
