= Maeve Quaid =

Canadian economist

Maeve Quaid is a senior faculty member in the Business Administration program at Trent University in Peterborough, Ontario. Quaid was educated at McGill University, the London School of Economics as well as a D.Phil. in Social Sciences from the University of Oxford. She teaches in the areas of Organizational Behaviour and Human Resource Management. She has written various articles and two books, one revealing how organizations devise their pay scales and the other on social policy, specifically on the training programs related to welfare reform. Quaid has written extensively on human resources and recently completed her latest work, entitled: Workfare: Why Good Social Policy Ideas Go Bad.

She also ran in the Canadian federal election in 1993 as a candidate for Progressive Conservative Party of Canada in the electoral district of Notre-Dame-de-Grâce.

== Selected publications ==
- Quaid, M. (2002) Workfare: Why Good Social Policy Ideas Go Bad, Toronto, University of Toronto Press.
- Quaid, M. (1997, 1993) Job Evaluation: The Myth of Equitable Assessment, Toronto, University of Toronto Press.

== See also ==
- Trent University
