= John A. McQuaid =

The Honourable John A. McQuaid
- Occupation: Jurist
- Known for: Justice of the Supreme Court of Prince Edward Island (1993–2013); Conflict of Interest Commissioner (2015–2020); Administrator of Prince Edward Island (March 2008)

John A. McQuaid is a former justice of the appeal division of the Supreme Court of Prince Edward Island, serving from 1993 to his retirement in 2013. McQuaid is also a former a conflict of interest commissioner, serving one term, from 2015 to 2020. As a member of the province's superior court, McQuaid is styled "The Honourable" during his tenure. McQuaid was briefly appointed as the Administrator of Prince Edward Island from 12 to 13 March 2008, to perform the functions of Lieutenant Governor Barbara Hagerman.
