= Des McLean (footballer) =

Scottish footballer

Personal information
- Full name: Desmond Francis McLean
- Date of birth: 20 May 1931
- Place of birth: Glasgow, Scotland
- Date of death: 2008 (aged 76–77)
- Position: Goalkeeper

Youth career
- St Mungo's Academy

Senior career*
Years	Team	Apps	(Gls)
1947–1949	Celtic	0	(0)
1949–1950	Queen's Park	0	(0)
1950–1952	Arsenal	0	(0)
1952–1953	Airdrieonians	2	(0)
1953	Dundee United	0	(0)
1955–1956	Dumbarton	3	(0)
1957	Philadelphia Uhrik Truckers		
Total		5	(0)
- * Club domestic league appearances and goals

Desmond Francis McLean (20 May 1931 – 2008) was a Scottish footballer who played as a goalkeeper for Celtic, Queen's Park, Arsenal, Airdrieonians, Dundee United and Dumbarton.

McLean joined Dundee United from Airdrie on a two-month contract in August 1953. He played in the first three Scottish League Cup matches of the season before losing his place, and was released when his contract expired.
