= Quaid-i-Millat =

Quaid-i-Millat or "Leader of the Country or Nation" may refer to,

- Liaquat Ali Khan (1895—1951), first prime minister of Pakistan
- Muhammad Ismail Sahib (1896–1972), Founder of Indian Union Muslim League
