= Millet (surname) =

Millet is a French surname.

== Geographical distribution ==
As of 2014, 73.0% of all known bearers of the surname Millet were residents of France (frequency 1:2,403), 12.3% of the United States (1:77,572), 3.9% of Spain (1:31,522) and 1.6% of the Philippines (1:164,078).

In France, the frequency of the surname was higher than national average (1:2,403) in the following regions:

1. Centre-Val de Loire (1:968)
2. Bourgogne-Franche-Comté (1:1,109)
3. Auvergne-Rhône-Alpes (1:1,928)
4. Nouvelle-Aquitaine (1:2,164)

== People ==
- Aimé Millet, French sculptor (1819–1891)
- Andrea Millet, Italian luger
- Catherine Millet, French art critic and author (born 1948)
- Denise Millet, French comic book artist (1933–2020)
- Floyd Millet, American sports player, coach (1911–2000)
- Francis Davis Millet American painter and sculptor (1848–1912)
- Francisque Millet, French painter and engraver (1642–1679)
- Jean-François Millet, French painter and engraver (1814–1875)
- Gabriel Millet, French archaeologist and historian (1867–1953)
- Lydia Millet, American novelist (born 1968)
- Maelle Millet French rhythmic gymnast (born 2004)
- Nicholas Millet, American-Canadian Egyptologist (1934–2004)
- Nisha Millet, Indian swimmer (born 1982)
- Pierre Millet, French Jesuit missionary (1635–1708)
- Richard Millet, French author (born 1953)
- Robert L. Millet, American theologian (born 1947)

== See also ==
- Millett
