= Jim McQuade =

Scottish footballer (1930–2020)

Personal information
- Full name: James McQuade
- Date of birth: 14 October 1930
- Place of birth: Barrhead, Scotland
- Date of death: 2020 (aged 90)
- Place of death: Barrhead, Scotland
- Position: Forward

Youth career
- Derry City

Senior career*
Years	Team	Apps	(Gls)
1956–1957	Dumbarton	1	(0)
1957–1958	Halifax Town	9	(2)
- * Club domestic league appearances and goals

James McQuade (14 October 1930 – 2020) was a Scottish footballer who played for Dumbarton and Halifax Town. He died in Barrhead in 2020, at the age of 90.
