= Benny Cairns =

Scottish footballer (born 1928)

Personal information
- Full name: Bernard Cairns
- Date of birth: 14 December 1928
- Place of birth: Clydebank, Scotland
- Position: Wing half

Youth career
- Duntocher Hibs

Senior career*
Years	Team	Apps	(Gls)
1950–1956	Airdrie	136	(1)
1955–1958	Dumbarton	87	(8)
1958–1961	Toronto Sparta/Roma		
1961–1962	Toronto City		
- * Club domestic league appearances and goals

Bernard Cairns (born 14 December 1928) was a Scottish footballer who played for Airdrie and Dumbarton. He played in Canada in 1958 for AC Sparta Toronto in the National Soccer League. In 1960, he was selected for the NSL All-Star team. In 1961, he played in the Eastern Canada Professional Soccer League with Toronto City FC.
